= Strict Scrutiny =

Podcast about the US Supreme Court

- Genre: Law
- Format: Audio
- Language: English

Cast and voices
- Hosted by: Leah Litman; Melissa Murray; Kate A. Shaw

Production
- Production: Melody Rowell

Publication
- No. of seasons: 6
- Original release: July 1, 2019
- Provider: Crooked Media

Related
- Website: strictscrutinypodcast.com

Strict Scrutiny is a podcast focusing on the Supreme Court of the United States and its associated legal culture. It is hosted by Leah Litman, Melissa Murray, and Kate Shaw. Litman is a professor of law at the University of Michigan Law School, Murray is a professor of law at New York University School of Law, and Shaw is a professor of law at the University of Pennsylvania Law School. The podcast debuted in 2019 and was acquired by Crooked Media in January 2022. In January 2023, it was nominated for an Ambie Award in the category "Best Politics or Opinion Podcast".

== Episodes ==
List of 2025 podcast episodes
Title	Date Aired	Summary
The Promise and Perils of Presidential Power	January 6, 2025	Features Lindsay Chervinsky, author of Making the Presidency: John Adams and the Precedents That Forged the Republic and Corey Brettschneider, author of The Presidents and the People: Five Leaders Who Threatened Democracy and the Citizens Who Fought to Defend It.
Is TikTok’s Time Up?	January 13, 2025	Features discussion of North Carolina Supreme Court seat, TikTok case, and interview with Michelle Adams, professor of law at the University of Michigan about her book The Containment: Detroit, The Supreme Court, and the Battle for Racial Justice in the North.
SCOTUS Unanimously Upholds TikTok Ban	January 17, 2025	Discussion of SCOTUS’s unanimous decision to uphold the upcoming TikTok ban.
SCOTUS’s Porn Problem	January 20, 2025	Features discussion of ERA, Free Speech Coalition v. Paxton, and Justice Alito’s questions about Pornhub.
Trump’s Onslaught of Executive Orders	January 27, 2025	Features discussion of executive orders, and TikTok.
The Lawlessness, Chaos, & Cruelty of Trump 2.0	February 3, 2025	Features discussion of firing inspectors, plane crash due to DEI, trans rights, and two state supreme court races.
DOGE Runs Amok & Originalism’s Ahistoricism	February 10, 2025	Features discussion of DOGE, Elon Musk, and interview with Jonathan Gienapp, professor of law and history at Stanford University and author of Against Constitutional Originalism: A Historical Critique.
Yes, We’re in a Constitutional Crisis	February 17, 2025	Live show. Fordham Law. Features discussion of Consumer Financial Protection Bureau.
The Atextual & Illegal Attack on Birthright Citizenship	February 24, 2025	Interview with Professor Kate Masur regarding birthright citizenship.
Pod Save the Separation of Powers	March 3, 2025	Covers latest court opinions.
The Conservative Push to Sue the Media Into Oblivion	March 10, 2025	This week’s SCOTUS arguments and opinions, including EPA’s clean water regulations and Mexico’s suing American gun manufacturers for cartel violence. Interview with David Enrich of the New York Times about his new book, Murder the Truth: Fear, the First Amendment, and a Secret Campaign to Protect the Powerful.
How to Lose a Democracy in 10 Laws (with Elie Mystal)	March 17, 2025	Features Elie Mystal, justice correspondent for The Nation, and his new book is Bad Law: Ten Popular Laws That Are Ruining America. Discussion of Mahmoud Khalil and the dismantling of the Department of Education.
Deportations and the Death of Due Process	March 24, 2025	Discussion of Alien Enemies Act to deport people from the US without due process, preview upcoming SCOTUS cases about the Voting Rights Act and the Environmental Protection Agency, targeting of law firms and DEI.
Can Elon Musk Buy the Wisconsin Supreme Court Race? (With Jon Lovett)	March 31, 2025	Features Jon Lovett, discussion of Wisconsin Supreme Court election, campaign for Susan M. Crawford in Madison and Milwaukee, court rulings, and relitigation of the Voting Rights Act.
What’s the Future of Planned Parenthood?	April 7, 2025	Discussion of recent opinions and arguments from the Supreme Court, tax exemptions for religious organisations and the future of Planned Parenthood, Susan M. Crawford’s election to the Wisconsin Supreme Court and Cory Booker’s 25-hour speech on the Senate floor, tariffs, and discuss the latest in the ongoing right-wing effort to challenge Allison Riggs’ election to the Supreme Court of North Carolina.
SCOTUS Lets Trump Play Word Games	April 14, 2025	Discussion of use of the 1798 Alien Enemies Act to deport people to El Salvador. An interview with Deborah Archer, professor of law at NYU and president of the ACLU, about her new book, Dividing Lines: How Transportation Infrastructure Reinforces Racial Inequality.
Are Trump Administration Officials in Criminal Contempt?	April 21, 2025	Discussion of criminal contempt, birthright citizenship and Harvard’s stand against the administration, and EPA.
Can Religious Parents Veto Books in Public Schools?	April 28, 2025	A recap of oral arguments in two big cases about LGBTQ+ books in public schools, and the Affordable Care Act’s preventative care. Discussion of the Alien Enemies Act litigation, and Civil Rights Act. Interview with Emily Amick, about conservatives pushing to get women to have more babies.
Will SCOTUS Sign Off on Religious Charter Schools?	May 5, 2025	Discussion of the Establishment Clause, religious charter school case, Oklahoma Statewide Charter School Board v. Drummond, Lisa Blatt’s discussion with Neil Gorsuch during oral arguments for a disability rights case, opinions concerning SSI benefits and the Department of Transportation, and the Trump administration’s absurd investigation into the Harvard Law Review.
The Supreme Court’s ‘Lawless’ Era	May 12, 2025	Discussion of Leah’s book, Lawless: How the Supreme Court Runs on Conservative Grievance, Fringe Theories, and Bad Vibes. Interview with Amanda Litman, author of the latest book from Crooked Reads, When We’re in Charge: The Next Generation’s Guide to Leadership.
Will the Courts Let Trump End Birthright Citizenship?	May 19, 2025	Discussion of Stephen Miller’s habeas suspension, and the emoluments clause. Interview with professor Elora Mukherjee of Columbia Law School regarding the birthright citizenship case.
A Blockbuster Non-Opinion and a Fascism Grab Bag	May 26, 2025	Discussion of the Court’s 4-4 deadlock on Oklahoma’s religious charter school case, the shadow docket, Judge James Ho, Kristi Noem’s Senate hearing, and fascism. Interview with Professor Noah Rosenblum of NYU School of Law regarding the SCOTUS 6-3 decision allowing the president to fire federal commissioners without cause.
It's Officially Bad Decision Season	June 2, 2025	Live show at Capital Turnaround in Washington, D.C. Discussion of sexual harassment claims against Texas’s ex-solicitor general, Judd Stone; and Brett Kavanaugh’s opinion on the National Environmental Policy Act. Interviews with Ambassador Norm Eisen and Emily Amick, author of the Substack, Emily in Your Phone.
9-0, but Make It Complicated	June 9, 2025	Discussion of this week’s SCOTUS decisions, including cases on “reverse discrimination” and whether Mexico can sue American gun manufacturers, a new travel bans and the Justice Department filing a lawsuit against North Carolina, and Kate’s rockstar testimony in front of the U.S. Senate Committee asking her about this podcast.
Can Trump Mobilize the Military Without California's Consent?	June 16, 2025	This show was recorded live in Sony Hall in New York City. They discuss fascism as troops deploy to California protesters, authoritarianism, the Kilmar Abrego Garcia case, and recent Supreme Court Opinions. Interview with Chase Strangio, deputy director for transgender justice and staff attorney with the ACLU. Then a game about iconic political breakups—political and otherwise.
SCOTUS Upholds Tennessee Ban on Gender-Affirming Care for Minors	June 18, 2025	An emergency episode with Chase Strangio of the ACLU and discussion of United States v. Skrmetti.
Ketanji Brown Jackson Sounds the Alarm	June 23, 2025	Interview with Bec Ingber regarding bombing Iran. Recap of court opinions with former legal journalist Mike Sacks and Georgetown Law’s Steve Vladeck.
SCOTUS Deals Massive Blow to Health Care Access	June 26, 2025	An emergency episode with Alexis McGill Johnson, president and CEO of Planned Parenthood, regarding today’s ruling in Medina v. Planned Parenthood South Atlantic. And a recap of today’s opinions and the Court’s cruel shadow docket order on “third country removals.”
SCOTUS Clears the Way for Trump’s Lawlessness	June 27, 2025	An emergency episode regarding Trump v. CASA, Inc., stopping the judiciary’s ability to issue nationwide injunctions.
SCOTUS Strengthens Conservative War on Education	June 30, 2025	A recap of Mahmoud v. Taylor, a case regarding picture books, cases involving age verification for adult entertainment and the Nondelegation doctrine.
A Term for the Rich, the Reactionaries, and the Ruthless	July 7, 2025	A recap of this year’s SCOTUS term with themes and the biggest opinions.
Hunger Games for Legal Hackery	July 14, 2025	Includes Katie Phang, independent journalist and trial lawyer and the week’s legal news including KBJ’s “this Court’s demonstrated enthusiasm for greenlighting this President’s legally dubious actions in an emergency posture” and an interview with Chris Hayes and his book, The Sirens’ Call: How Attention Became the World’s Most Endangered Resource.
SCOTUS Enables Government Destruction	July 21, 2025	Recap of the latest legal news, including dismantling of the Department of Education; and an interview with NYU law professor Rachel Barkow about her book, Justice Abandoned: How the Supreme Court Ignored the Constitution and Enabled Mass Incarceration.
Can Trump Sue His Way Out of the Epstein Mess?	July 28, 2025	Recap of this week’s legal news. Includes Epstein, the shadow docket, and Alina Habba’s appointment as U.S. Attorney for New Jersey. Interview with law professors—and former clerks for David Souter—Allison Orr Larsen and Erin Delaney.
Stacking the Bench with Creeps & Kooks	August 4, 2025	Includes Mark Joseph Stern of Slate and the Amicus. A recap of court opinions including attacks on judges, Emil Bove, and Amy Coney Barrett’s upcoming appearance with Bari Weiss. Interview with Jessica Calarco, sociologist and professor at the University of Wisconsin–Madison, about her book, Holding It Together: How Women Became America’s Safety Net.
How the GOP is Trying to Steal the 2026 Midterms	August 11, 2025	Includes Imani Gandy of Rewire News Group. A recap of legal news including Texas gerrymandering, college admissions, and more Epstein. Interview with Duke Law Professor Brandon Garrett about his book, Defending Due Process: Why Fairness Matters in a Polarized World. Interview with University of Michigan Law Professor Richard Primus, author of the new book The Oldest Constitutional Question: Enumeration and Federal Power.
The Dubious Legality of Trump's DC Takeover	August 18, 2025	State of the Uterus 2025 Episode (3 of 3 so far). Recap of the week’s legal news, including argument calendars for the next SCOTUS term and President Trump’s attempted federal takeover of Washington, DC. Interview with Alexis McGill Johnson, president and CEO of the Planned Parenthood Federation of America, and Lisa Beattie Frelinghuysen, founder of ClutchKit, about the current status of reproductive freedoms since the Supreme Court overturned Roe v. Wade. Discussion of After Dobbs: How the Supreme Court Ended Roe, But Not Abortion.
The Shadow Docket Just Won’t Quit	August 25, 2025	Recap of legal news, including the Court’s greenlighting of Trump’s anti-DEI National Institutes of Health cuts, mail-in ballots, and a missive from Solicitor General John Sauer. An interview with candidate for Michigan attorney general Eli Savit. An interview with Penn Law professor Serena Mayeri about her book, Marital Privilege: Marriage, Inequality, and the Transformation of American Law.
The Lower Courts Punch Up	September 8, 2025	Discussion of how the lower courts are challenging the Trump administration and SCOTUS; Brett Kavanaugh, shadow docket, and Amy Coney Barrett. An interview with Yale Law professor Justin Driver about his book, The Fall of Affirmative Action: Race, the Supreme Court, and the Future of Higher Education.
How SCOTUS is Making Project 2025 a Reality	September 15, 2025	Recap of latest shadow docket, racial profiling by ICE officers, administrative stays, Amy Coney Barrett, lower courts’ opinions regarding the Supreme Court. An interview with Symone Sanders-Townsend, co-host of MSNBC’s The Weeknight, about Project 2025.
Looking for Bright Spots in the Courts	September 22, 2025	Includes guest co-host Skye Perryman, president & CEO of Democracy Forward, the week’s news, the shadow docket, lower court opinions and Article II. An interview with Sherrilyn Ifill regarding Ketanji Brown Jackson.
The Trump Administration's SCOTUS Winning Streak	September 29, 2025	Recap of the week’s legal news, Hawaii, Sam Alito’s, and the DOJ’s refusal to investigate border czar Tom Homan. Interviews with Sherrilyn Ifill, founding director of the 14th Amendment Center for Law & Democracy at Howard University, and New York Times columnist Jamelle Bouie to discuss the Supreme Court in the years after the Civil War and Reconstruction, known as the Redemption Court.
Something Wicked This Way Comes: A SCOTUS Term Preview	October 6, 2025	Live show at the Athenaeum Center in Chicago. Discussion of challenges to the Fourteenth Amendment, the latest legal news, and an interview with Lieutenant Governor of Illinois–and Senate candidate–Juliana Stratton; and a game.
Will SCOTUS Allow Conversion Therapy for Minors?	October 13, 2025	Recap of the term’s first week of arguments at SCOTUS, including a challenge to Colorado’s ban on conversion therapy for minors, the indictment of New York’s Attorney General Letitia James, the National Guard in Portland and Chicago, and Attorney General Pamela Jo Bondi’s testimony before the Senate Judiciary Committee. An interview with Yale Law Professor John Fabian Witt about his book The Radical Fund: How a Band of Visionaries and a Million Dollars Upended America, about philanthropist Charles Garland.
Will the Voting Rights Act Survive SCOTUS?	October 20, 2025	Recap of Louisiana v. Callais. An interview with Sam Spital, Associate Director-Counsel at the Legal Defense Fund. A recap of the week’s other arguments and the latest legal news. An interview with Joyce Vance about her new book, Giving Up Is Unforgivable: A Manual for Keeping a Democracy.
Trump’s DOJ Shakedown	October 27, 2025	Recap of this week’s of legal news, deployment of the National Guard, ProPublica’s reporting on “Kavanaugh stops,” U.S. Attorney Lindsey Halligan and Lawfare’s Anna Bower. An interview with author Irin Carmon about her new book, Unbearable: Five Women and the Perils of Pregnancy in America.
The Legal Battles Over Trump’s War on Blue Cities	November 3, 2025	Discussion of ICE and the National Guard in Chicago and Portland, Kim Davis, air strikes on boats around South America, November’s SCOTUS cases, including Learning Resources, Inc. v. Trump, and the International Emergency Economic Powers Act.
Will SCOTUS Say No to Trump’s Tariffs?	November 10, 2025	Live show in Washington. A recap of oral arguments for Learning Resources, Inc. v. Trump. An interview with Representative LaMonica McIver. A discussion with Steve Vladeck about Justice Ketanji Brown Jackson’s Friday night administrative stay regarding the funding of SNAP benefits.
The Agonies of Brett Kavanaugh	November 17, 2025	A recap of legal news, including updates on the SNAP benefits case, Jeffrey Epstein, Representative LaMonica McIver, and oral arguments at the Supreme Court.
Boy Math, Boy Law, Man Problems	November 24, 2025	Discussion of redistricting ahead of next year’s midterms, Interim U.S. Attorney Lindsey Halligan, James Comey, and Epstein. An interview with University of Minnesota Law Professor Jill Hasday about her book We the Men: How Forgetting Women’s Struggles for Equality Perpetuates Inequality.
December Preview: SCOTUS Doubles Down on Its BS	December 1, 2025	An interview with New Jersey Attorney General Matthew Platkin about First Choice Women’s Resource Centers v. Platkin (now Davenport), which is an anti-abortion case. A recap of December’s oral arguments, which include campaign finance, and judicial review of asylum cases, legal news, the dismissal of the James Comey and Letitia James indictments.
SCOTUS Greenlights Racial Gerrymandering in Texas	December 5, 2025	Emergency episode discussing shadow docket order allowing Texas redistricting prior to midterms.
We Need To Talk About Trump’s Maritime Murders	December 8, 2025	Includes Professor Rebecca Ingber of Cardozo Law to discuss murders in the waters off South America. Recap of oral arguments, including “crisis pregnancy centers,” asylum claims, and copyright violations.
SCOTUS Is About to Turbocharge Presidential Power	December 15, 2025	A recap of Trump v. Slaughter, campaign finance and the death penalty, Judge Emil Bove and churning of U.S. attorneys.
Our Favorite Things, 2025	December 22, 2025	Includes intern Jordan Thomas and former Chair of the Federal Election Commission Ellen Weintraub.

List of 2026 podcast episodes
Title	Date Aired	Summary
Can America Pull Back from the Brink of Autocracy?	January 5, 2026	Includes Rebecca Ingber of Cardozo Law to discuss Venezuela. Interview with Princeton professor and expert on the rise of modern autocracies, Kim Lane Scheppele. Interview with president and CEO of Democracy Forward Skye Perryman who discusses the Department of Education funding cuts, the freezing of childcare payments to Minnesota, and a near-total abortion ban for veterans. An interview with Demand Justice’s Josh Orton about judicial nominees.
Debunking Trump’s Bullsh*t Legal Arguments for Invading Venezuela	January 12, 2026	A preview January’s major SCOTUS cases, including trans rights in team sports, a concealed carry ban in Hawaii, and Federal Reserve Governor Lisa Cook. An interview with Georgetown Law Professor Marty Lederman to discuss Venezuela, the shadow docket’s ruling on deployment of the National Guard in Chicago. Discussion of Renee Good, a habeas case, and Assistant Attorney General for Civil Rights.
Will SCOTUS Keep Trans Kids out of Sports?	January 19, 2026	Discussion of Minneapolis, Federal Reserve Chair Jerome Powell, state laws barring trans girls and women from their schools’ sports teams violate the Constitution or Title IX, new opinions from SCOTUS involving criminal law, the Fourth Amendment, and mail-in ballots.
Will the Court Actually Push Back Against Trump’s Unlawful Firings?	January 26, 2026	Discussion of the ICE occupation in Minnesota, Renee Good and Alex Pretti, the latest legal news, including Jack Smith, Trump v. Cook, Lisa Cook, and a Second Amendment case.
The Illegality and Injustice of ICE’s Minnesota Occupation	February 2, 2026	Discussion of legal cases regarding ICE’s occupation of Minnesota, Operation Metro Surge and the abusive use of tear gas and pepper spray. An interview with Tommy Vietor regarding the “Donroe Doctrine,” and tariffs. Discussion of an FBI raid on the Fulton County elections office supervised Tulsi Gabbard.
Are You There, God? It’s Me, the Constitution.	February 9, 2026	Discussion of the latest Minnesota news, the Department of Homeland Security’s use of administrative subpoenas and Jodi Kantor’s reporting on the introduction of non-disclosure agreements to the Supreme Court, the Tulsi Gabbard-supervised FBI raid on an elections office in Fulton County, Georgia, an update on the challenge against California’s Proposition 50, Gavin Newsom’s counter to racial gerrymandering in Texas, Kristi Noem’s attempt to revoke Temporary Protected Status for Haitians.
Is Sam Alito on his Way Out?	February 16, 2026	Legal news, Sam Alito’s retirement, Pete Hegseth, Mark Kelly, Pamela Jo Bondi’s Epstein files testimony, Minnesota, ICE, clean air, the Heritage Foundation, and audio clips.
BREAKING: SCOTUS Nixes Trump’s Tariffs	February 20, 2026	Discussion of the Supreme Court striking down Trump’s tariffs.
SCOTUS Again Takes on the 2nd Amendment—What Could Go Wrong?	February 23, 2026	Includes Steve Vladeck (One First). A recap of last week’s legal news, including noncompliance in the lower courts and SCOTUS ethics, a preview of upcoming arguments including asylum and Second Amendment cases. Finally, Kate speaks with Elliot Williams about his new book, Five Bullets: The Story of Bernie Goetz, New York’s Explosive ’80s, and the Subway Vigilante Trial That Divided the Nation.
The Conservative Push To Weaken Our Democracy	March 2, 2026	Includes international law expert Rebecca Ingber of Cardozo Law to discuss Iran. Includes guest co-host Chris Geidner of Law Dork. Discusses domestic legal news, including the Epstein files, Casey Means’s confirmation hearing, halting of Medicaid funds to Minnesota, independent media, and last week’s oral arguments. An interview with Marc Elias, chair of Elias Law Group and founder of Democracy Docket regarding VRA.
A Court of Drugs and Guns	March 9, 2026	Recap of oral arguments in United States v. Hemani, a Second Amendment case, Kristi Noem, shadow docket rulings allowing racial gerrymander and outing of transgender children. An interview with California Attorney General Rob Bonta.
Make America Grift Again	March 16, 2026	Recent oral arguments and opinions, and an interview with Representative Jimmy Gomez of California’s 34th Congressional District.
Absentee Ballots, Asylum, and Too Many A**holes to Count	March 23, 2026	A preview of this week’s arguments at the Court, including Watson v. Republican National Committee, legal news, Senator Rand Paul and Markwayne Mullin.
Will SCOTUS Join the GOP War on Mail-in Ballots?	March 30, 2026	Includes guest co-host Ian Bassin of Protect Democracy, the latest legal news, including developments at the Pentagon and Department of Justice, Trump’s threat to judges, the week’s opinions and oral arguments, and Watson v. RNC. An interview with Elora Mukherjee, director of the Immigrants’ Rights Clinic at Columbia Law School, discusses the asylum case argued before the Court last week, the birthright citizenship case, and detainees at the Dilley Immigration Processing Center in Texas.
SCOTUS Not Cool With Colorado Ban on Conversion Therapy	March 31, 2026	Chiles v. Salazar, the case involving a Colorado ban on conversion therapy. Interview with Shannon Minter, Legal Director at the National Center for LGBTQ Rights.
Birthright Citizenship + Bye-Bye, Pamela Jo Bondi	April 6, 2026	Recap of oral arguments in the birthright citizenship case, Trump v. Barbara, and firing Pamela Jo Bondi.
War Crimes, Christian Nationalism, and the 25th Amendment	April 13, 2026	Legal with Katie Phang including Iran, and Christian nationalist rhetoric from the Secretary of Defense. An interview with Emily Amick regarding the 25th Amendment.
SCOTUS Squabbles Go Public	April 20, 2026	Legal news, Trump vs. Pope Leo, Sonia Sotomayor vs. Brett Kavanaugh, Clarence Thomas vs. progressives, and Ketanji Brown Jackson vs. the shadow docket, Harvard Crimson’s reporting on conservative judges’ clerkships, Chevron USA Inc. v. Plaquemines Parish, and Blanche v. Lau.
How Low Can the DOJ Go?	April 27, 2026	Legal news including Southern Poverty Law Center, Kash Patel’s lawsuit, a Texas mandate to display the Ten Commandments in classrooms, and Elizabeth Prelogar. An interview with University of Pennsylvania law professor Shaun Ossei-Owusu about his new book, Law on Trial: An Unlikely Insider Reckons with Our Legal System.
BREAKING: SCOTUS Deals Another Blow to Multiracial Democracy	April 29, 2026	Includes Democracy Docket’s Marc Elias to discuss the Voting Rights Act case, Louisiana v. Callais.
Supreme Court Declares Racism Over	May 4, 2026	Discussion of the Voting Rights Act decision in Louisiana v. Callais, and Mullin v. Doe, the case about Temporary Protected Status, Trump’s ballroom, arguments in an important Fourth Amendment case, and the Unitary executive theory.
The Constitution (Melissa’s Version)	May 11, 2026	Interview with Melissa about her new book, The U.S. Constitution: A Comprehensive and Annotated Guide for the Modern Reader. Discussion of the Virginia Supreme Court invalidating voter-approved redistricting maps. An interview with Nancy Northup, president and CEO of the Center for Reproductive Rights, about mifepristone.
How SCOTUS is Waging Electoral Warfare	May 18, 2026	Discussion of access to mifepristone, and last week’s legal news. An interview with Ari Berman, national voting rights correspondent for Mother Jones, about Louisiana v. Callais. An interview with Kenji Yoshino and David Glasgow about their book, How Equality Wins: A New Vision for an Inclusive America.
Trump’s Heartbreaking Work of Staggering Grift	May 25, 2026	Discussion of $2 billion DOJ slush fund, legal news and some SCOTUS opinions. An interview with Dorothy Roberts about her book, The Mixed Marriage Project: A Memoir of Love, Race, and Family.
Ballrooms, ‘Bama and (Very) Bad Behavior	June 1, 2026	Recap of legal news, the Voting Rights Act case, Louisiana v. Callais, the DOJ’s insurrectionist slush fund, the Broadview Six, ballroom drama, a Georgia judge had loud sex in her chambers and then lied about it, compassionate release for prisoners, and compelled arbitration. An interview with University of Michigan law professor Barbara McQuade about her book, The Fix: Saving America from the Corruption of a Mob-Style Government.
Affirmative Action for Mediocre Men	June 8, 2026	Discussion of racially discriminatory voting maps, Trump’s slush fund, Acting AG Todd Blanche and Acting DNI Bill Pulte, three SCOTUS opinions from last week. An interview with Yale Law Professor Judith Resnik about her recent book, Impermissible Punishments: How Prison Became a Problem for Democracy.
The Malicious Incompetence of Trump’s DOJ	June 15, 2026	Recap of this week’s three Supreme Court opinions, including a Ketanji Brown Jackson dissent, legal news, a violent judge, politically motivated prosecutors in Chicago, and incompetent lawyering. An interview with Mary Moriarty, Hennepin County (MN) Attorney, about ICE and federal overreach.
Why is SCOTUS Hoarding Opinions?	June 22, 2026	Live episode at the Gramercy Theatre in New York City. Includes Elie Mystal of The Nation. Discussion of lack of opinions this late in June, United States v. Hemani, the Second Amendment, and Amy Coney Barrett’s Ambien, and the Lincoln Memorial Reflecting Pool.
Scotus Kills Independent Agencies, Expands Presidential Power	June 29, 2026	Emergency episode regarding Trump v. Slaughter, Trump v. Cook, Project 2025 and Watson v. RNC.
SCOTUS Just Barely Preserves Birthright Citizenship	June 30, 2026	Emergency episode regarding majority opinion allowing states to exclude trans women and girls from female sports teams, campaign finance law, and birthright citizenship.

== See also ==
- "When a man argues against two beautiful ladies like this, they are going to have the last word", quote used in each episode's introduction
