= Bracey (surname) =

Bracey is an English surname. Notable people with the surname include:

- Andrew Bracey (born 1978), British artist
- Bonnie Bracey, American teacher
- Bryan Bracey (born 1978), American-Irish retired basketball player
- Christopher Bracey (born 1970), American lawyer and professor
- Claude Bracey (1909–1940), American sprinter
- Frederick Bracey (1887–1960), English cricketer
- Gerald Bracey (1940–2009), American education policy researcher
- Ishmon Bracey (1901–1970), American blues musician
- Keith Bracey (1915/1916–2010), New Zealand television presenter
- Ken Bracey (1937–2017), American minor league baseball player and manager
- Kim Bracey, American politician
- Lee Bracey (born 1968), English footballer
- Luke Bracey (born 1989), Australian actor
- Shermar Bracey (born 1982), American player of Canadian football
- Sidney Bracey (1877–1942), Australian-born American actor
- Steve Bracey (1950–2006), American NBA basketball player

With the given name:

- Bracey Wright, NBA player, guard for the Minnesota Timberwolves, 2015 Israeli Basketball Premier League MVP
