= Landmark Cases: Historic Supreme Court Decisions =

- Presented by: Susan Swain
- Country of origin: United States
- Original language: English
- No. of seasons: 2
- No. of episodes: 24

Production
- Executive producers: Mark Farkas; Ben O'Connell
- Running time: 90 minutes

Original release
- Network: C-SPAN

Landmark Cases: Historic Supreme Court Decisions is a series first aired by C-SPAN in the fall of 2015 about 12 key cases argued in front of the U.S. Supreme Court. A second season aired in the winter and spring of 2018, in which 12 additional cases were discussed. Each episode is 90 minutes long, airs live, and examines a specific case in detail. The series is hosted by Susan Swain, and episodes typically feature two legal scholars discussing the case, video footage from locations pertinent to the case, and questions and comments from viewers. C-SPAN produced the series in conjunction with the National Constitution Center.

Supreme Court journalist Tony Mauro wrote companion books for each season, which were published by C-SPAN and CQ Press. They drew on Mauro's earlier book Illustrated Great Decisions of the Supreme Court.

== Table of episodes ==
| First air date (with link to video) | Case | Year of case | Featured guests |
First season (October 5, 2015 - December 21, 2015)
| October 5, 2015 | Marbury v. Madison | 1803 | Akhil Reed Amar; Clifford Sloan |
| October 12, 2015 | Scott v. Sandford | 1857 | Christopher Bracey; Martha Jones |
| October 19, 2015 | The Slaughterhouse Cases | 1873 | Paul Clement; Michael Ross |
| October 26, 2015 | Lochner v. New York | 1905 | Randy Barnett; Paul Kens |
| November 2, 2015 | Schenck v. United States | 1919 | Beverly Gage; Thomas Goldstein |
| November 9, 2015 | Korematsu v. United States | 1944 | Peter Irons; Karen Korematsu |
| November 16, 2015 | Youngstown Sheet & Tube Co. v. Sawyer | 1952 | Michael Gerhardt; William G. Howell |
| November 23, 2015 | Brown v. Board of Education | 1954 | Jeffrey Rosen^{*} Tomiko Brown-Nagin |
| November 30, 2015 | Mapp v. Ohio | 1962 | Carolyn Long; Renee Hutchins |
| December 7, 2015 | Baker v. Carr | 1962 | Theodore Olson; J. Douglas Smith |
| December 14, 2015 | Miranda v. Arizona | 1966 | Jeffrey Rosen; Paul Cassel |
| December 21, 2015 | Roe v. Wade | 1973 | Clarke Forsythe; Melissa Murray |
Second season (February 26, 2018 - May 14, 2018)
| February 26, 2018 | McCulloch v. Maryland | 1819 | Mark Killenbeck; Farah Peterson |
| March 5, 2018 | The Civil Rights Cases | 1883 | Danielle Holley-Walker; Peter Kirsanow |
| March 12, 2018 | Yick Wo v. Hopkins | 1886 | Josh Blackman; Mae Ngai |
| March 19, 2018 | Plessy v. Ferguson | 1896 | Michael Klarman; Ted Shaw |
| March 26, 2018 | Gideon v. Wainwright | 1963 | Akhil Reed Amar; Paul Clement |
| April 2, 2018 | Griswold v. Connecticut | 1965 | Helen Alvare; Rachel Rebouche |
| April 9, 2018 | Katz v. United States | 1967 | Jamil Jaffer; Jeffrey Rosen |
| April 16, 2018 | Brandenburg v. Ohio | 1969 | Katie Fallow; Nadine Strossen |
| April 23, 2018 | Tinker v. Des Moines | 1969 | Erik Jaffe; Mary Beth Tinker |
| April 30, 2018 | New York Times v. United States | 1971 | Floyd Abrams; Ted Olson |
| May 7, 2018 | Gregg v. Georgia | 1976 | Kent Scheidegger; Carol Steiker |
| May 14, 2018 | Regents of Univ. Cal v. Bakke | 1978 | Randy Barnett; Neal Katyal |

Note: Kannon Shanmugam had originally been scheduled to appear on this program, but was replaced by Rosen.
