= John Fabian Witt =

American historian

- Occupation: Professor
- Awards: Bancroft Prize

Academic background
- Education: Yale University (BA, JD, PhD)

Academic work
- Discipline: Law
- Institutions: Yale University
- Notable works: Lincoln's Code; American Contagions

John Fabian Witt is Allen H. Duffy Class of 1960 Professor of Law at Yale Law School. He is the author of Lincoln’s Code: The Laws of War in American History, which won the 2013 Bancroft Prize in history of the Americas and, in 2020, American Contagions: Epidemics and the Law from Smallpox to COVID-19. In October 2025 Witt published The Radical Fund: How a Band of Visionaries and a Million Dollars Upended America, about the Garland fund, established in 1921 by Charles Garland with an inheritance from his father.

== Biography ==
Witt received his B.A., his J.D., and his Ph.D, all from Yale. In 2001, he was awarded the John Addison Porter Prize for "The Accidental Republic: Amputee Workingmen, Destitute Widows, and the Remaking of American Law, 1866-1922." Before returning to teach at Yale, he was the George Welwood Murray Professor of Legal History at Columbia University. In 2007, he criticized the historical basis of John Yoo's theories. In April 2017, Witt was named the head of Davenport College, one of Yale's 14 residential colleges.
