= Law School Transparency =

U.S. nonprofit organization

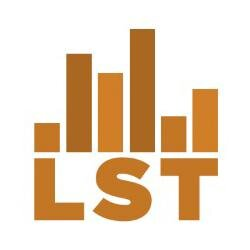
- Formation: 2009
- Website: LawHub

Law School Transparency (LST) is a nonprofit consumer advocacy and education organization concerning the legal profession in the United States. LST was founded by Vanderbilt Law School graduates Kyle McEntee and Patrick Lynch. LST describes its mission as "to make entry to the legal profession more transparent, affordable, and fair."

Law School Transparency was acquired by the Law School Admission Council (LSAC) in 2022.

== History ==
Law School Transparency was founded in July 2009 by two law students at Vanderbilt University Law School, Kyle McEntee and Patrick J. Lynch. When Lynch obtained a job practicing environmental law with a nongovernmental organization in South America, he reduced his involvement in LST. Derek Tokaz, a graduate of NYU Law School, also works on several LST projects. Securing funding and resources was one of the greatest challenges for the organization.

Their goal was to improve legal education and the legal profession through increased access to high-quality post-graduation job outcome information. The duo was motivated by Vanderbilt's comprehensive disclosure of job outcomes in early 2008. McEntee and several of his classmates decided to attend Vanderbilt in fall 2008 in part due to the information revealed by the law school.

In order to increase access to better information, McEntee and Lynch first identified two key problems with law school disclosure practices in a white paper originally published in April 2010. An updated version of the white paper was published by Pace Law Review two years later.

First, law schools provided misleading and incomplete employment information that took advantage of how students understand law schools and the legal profession. For example, law schools advertised basic employment rates that included any job in the numerator, whether short-term or long-term, part-time or full-time, legal or non-legal. Schools even counted volunteer jobs funded by the law school, leading almost every school to report employment rates over 90%. In addition, law schools reported deceptively high starting salaries. Notably, law schools reported the median salary for a small percentage of the class without disclosing the response rate or sampling bias.

Second, law schools did not share basic information they possessed that would have helped students better understand school offerings and career paths. The result was an information asymmetry favoring law schools that enabled law schools to raise tuition prices indiscriminately.

To solve these problems, LST asked law schools to voluntarily disclose basic employment information about recent graduates. Knowing that law schools would decline initially, McEntee and Lynch were actually targeting the American Bar Association's accreditation standards. By 2012, LST succeeded in reforming the ABA standards to better protect students and to hold law schools accountable, and in changing attitudes about how law schools interact with prospective students.

David Lat contended that "Most observers are content just to complain about law schools not being forthcoming enough about employment information." Elie Mystal added that "McEntee and Lynch are trying to fill a void left open by organizations with regulatory power (e.g. American Bar Association (the ABA)), organizations with public power (e.g. U.S. News & World Report (U.S. News)), and organizations with no power (e.g. National Association for Law Placement (NALP))." Writing for American Lawyer Media's The Careerist, Vivia Chen observed that "It's not easy getting the attention of a mammoth organization like ABA, but LST did it. It deserves our kudos."

In 2022, LST was acquired and is now operated under the umbrella of the Law School Admission Council (LSAC).
