= Charles Garland =

Charles Garland may refer to:

- Charles Garland (Australian politician) (1854–1930), Australian politician and mining entrepreneur
- Charles Garland (British politician) (1887–1960), British Conservative Party politician and chemist
- Chuck Garland (1898–1971), American tennis player
- Charles Garland (philanthropist) (1899–1974), American philanthropist
