= Tony Mauro =

American journalist and author

Tony Mauro is an American journalist and author who has covered the United States Supreme Court since 1979, most recently for The National Law Journal and other ALM publications.

Mauro began covering the Supreme Court for Gannett News Service and USA Today. He joined Legal Times in 2000. Since Legal Times merged with The National Law Journal in 2009, he has continued as the publication's Supreme Court correspondent. He is the author of several books about the Supreme Court, including "Illustrated Great Decisions of the Supreme Court" (2006) and "Landmark Cases: 12 Historic Supreme Court Decisions" (2015). Later, Mauro wrote companion books for each season of Landmark Cases: Historic Supreme Court Decisions; the books were published by C-SPAN and CQ Press.

In 2001 and 2005, Washingtonian magazine listed Mauro among the Top 50 journalists in Washington, D.C.
