= Eric Butcher =

English painter (born 1970)

- Born: 1970 (age 55–56); Singapore
- Education: Corpus Christi College, Cambridge, Wimbledon School of Art
- Known for: Painting
- Movement: Abstract art

Eric Butcher (born 1970) is a contemporary British abstract painter known for his reductive, processed-based approach.

Butcher read philosophy at Corpus Christi College, Cambridge, graduating in 1994 and completed an MA in Fine Art at Wimbledon School of Art in 2001. He has exhibited extensively in the UK and internationally with shows in Germany, Italy, Australia and the USA. He currently shows with Toomey Tourell gallery, San Francisco, Galerie Robert Drees in Hannover and Patrick Heide Contemporary Art.

He has received awards from the Arts Council, England and the Arts and Humanities Research Council. He has also held an Arts Institute at Bournemouth Research Fellowship (now the AUB) and the Centre for Arts International Research/Liverpool College of Art & Design, Liverpool John Moores University, Multiple Perspectives Fellowship (2007).

In 2002 Butcher was the recipient of Art London: Visual Arts Development Award, and Artist in Residence, Benson-Sedgwick Engineering, London from 2008 to 2010.

Butcher was shortlisted in the final Jerwood Drawing Prize in 2017 (now Trinity Buoy Wharf Drawing Prize) alongside artists such as Barbara Walker (artist) and selected by writer/curator, David Dibosa; Helen Legg, director of Tate Liverpool (then director of Spike Island Artspace); and Michael Simpson (painter). In 2020 Butcher exhibited Sweet Heresy, his second solo show at Patrick Heide Contemporary Art, which coincided with the release of Time Trial, a newly published 160-page hardback catalogue of his recent work.

In recent years Butcher has been shortlisted for the Derwent Art Prize 2022, the Trinity Buoy Wharf Drawing Prize 2024, the Contemporary British Painting Prize 2024, and the John Ruskin Prize and Evelyn Williams Drawing Award in 2025.

== Early life and education ==
Eric Butcher was born in Singapore in 1970 to a Dutch mother and British father. Shortly after he was born the family moved to Kuala Lumpur, Malaysia and then settled in the UK in Hampshire, England in 1974. After leaving school at 16 he spent two formative years studying art at Basingstoke College of Technology, after which he undertook A Levels at evening classes and eventually found his way to Corpus Christi College, Cambridge, reading philosophy and graduating in 1994. After several years of developing his work in relative isolation he returned to art school and in 2001 he completed an MA in Fine Art at Wimbledon School of Art. He has worked for the past twenty years from a rural setting in his studio in Oxfordshire a converted barn and a place of tranquility, creativity and precision.

== Career ==
=== Endgame (2020—present) ===
Endgame is the latest body of work from Eric Butcher. The work marks a significant and pivotal development in Butcher's practice, reflecting a deepening investigation into his legacy and a deliberate dismantling of his earlier pieces.

Conceptual Framework

For years, Butcher's practice has involved the incremental building up, and stripping back, of paint over a surface. With Endgame the artist has pulled apart his former practice, peeling away the layers of paint from their supports and re-presenting the resulting fragments—an approach that now informs all of his future work ("He intends to use only materials already available in the studio, repurposing and recycling without consuming new resources"). Set within sheets of glass, like scientific specimens, these fragments collect the 'natural history' of his creative past.

Endgame will use his existing materials as a resource for as long as possible, until there is no longer anything left to create from.

=== Early work ===
Butcher's earliest exhibited works were compositions of oil, resin and spray paint on large, tablet-like MDF supports. The combination of painted surface and exaggerated depth of the support made the works deliberately and obviously three-dimensional objects – an ‘attempt to deny the viewer the desire to see the surface as anything other than surface’. This composed physical presence was inherent in even the most restrained of Butcher's works, as William Packer would go on to say in his introduction to Butcher's 2005 catalogue, Carbon Candy, ‘even when hung conventionally, flat to the wall, they remain obviously and directly physical’. Although characterised by their appearance – an abstract ‘accretion of paint, resin and various other fluids’ - their manufacture was faithful to the rules that govern Butcher's creative process. Butcher has said of his practice that ‘the application or subtraction of paint as a set of processes is achieved through a variety of continually evolving techniques which draw attention to the physical properties of my materials’, a result that would be most clearly manifest in his subsequent metal works. The introduction of metal as a support revolutionised Butcher's creative output and his approach to the act of painting, ‘it may just be a flat piece of metal... But they all have little nicks, edges and imperfections... the result is an accumulation of what I have learnt about that surface’.

ER.358 Oil and resin on extruded aluminium box sections.

=== Philosophy and approach to painting ===
‘The application or subtraction of paint’ in Butcher's practice is executed through the use of ‘a metal blade drawn across the painting's surface’ pulling a thin transparent monochrome of oil and resin over the metal support, ‘this procedure is then repeated and repeated, building up a surface of accumulated residues'. The outcome of each painting is determined by ‘variations in colour modulation’ and largely ‘by the physical characteristics of the support’. 'Paint is registered in vertical and horizontal bands across the surface of the metal plane, with areas of metal left unpainted and its polished face exposed to the viewer. the colour is omitted and the bare aluminium emerges. As a result, two rhythms arise; on the one hand the colour fields are interrupted by sections of contrasting colour, and on the other hand we have the various degrees of paint application, which range from impasto to diaphanous. They completely cover the aluminium, yet also let it shimmer through'.

Although Butcher has a uniform approach to each work, they nevertheless differ vastly from one another as the artist may encounter subtle material differences in the surface of each extrusion; burrs in the metal itself or unexpected variations in the applied paint wash. Almost every piece will seek to preserve some element of the metal as well, ‘the aluminium asserts itself as the artwork's true substance’. As Butcher seeks to articulate the surfaces of aluminium structures, he does so not only through the repetitive layers of colour application, but also through the preservation of the support's original condition (before his intervention) – both make for an overall representation of that particular structure's history.

In the 2019 catalogue, Time Trial, the artist describes his repetitive, quasi-mechanised, approach as exposing a quintessentially human quality, one where the 'limitations and failures of the human hand are writ large' compared with the perfection of machine production. The painted surface, which registers any deviation from its 'flat, featureless monochrome is predicated upon error or impurity, human or material'. In this way, the artist describes his practice as representing a 'glorification of error'. These 'errors' occur when the 'subtle shifts in the pressure applied, inflexion or angle of the stripping blade leave their traces in the shifts of consistency and density of paint.' 'The finished piece represents an accumulation of what [he has] learnt about that particular surface through successive applications and subtractions'. While the rules that govern Butcher's process have been fundamental, these rules have been relaxed in recent years as the creative act and process become 'both a means (to the object) and an end in itself'.

=== Site-specific installations ===
For the Material Witness exhibition at Toomey Tourell gallery in 2010, Butcher exhibited fourteen of his painted aluminium extrusions. Hung vertically and spaced asymmetrically with a measured and careful distance between one another, the display articulated Butcher's increasing awareness of, and preoccupation with, ‘installation’ in creating a total cohesive experience rather than an isolated object. As Kenneth Baker, in his San Francisco Chronicle review, wrote of the work's interaction with the space it occupied, ‘to walk this piece is to compose and recompose it through observation. Its geometry and built-in illusionism dictate that it cannot be seen whole’. This can also be said of Butcher's curatorial practice, where, as in the Definite Article exhibition curated by the artist himself, he deals with the scale and arrangement of works by Roger Ackling, Marc Vaux and Cathy Wade, as well as his own. Butcher's attempts within his own works in that exhibition to, ‘engage the space around the painted surface’ were similarly factors that he encountered in his curation of the exhibition as a whole, ‘each of the artists... employs a range of techniques to encourage the viewer to engage with the work physically’.

Eric Butcher's site-specific installations are interventions in space. Like the intimate relationship between painted surface and objects that distinguish his work, they become 'a pause in the act or a mistake in the material', 'subtle and stunning, installed in space dispersed over corners, corridors or in staircases they become architecture in motion'. This methodology can be seen in the lengths, or fragments, of aluminium that 'seem to cling to the wall [in his installations]. In part driven by chance, and yet still composed according to a strict order'. The context of these installations have become increasingly important, 'determined by aspects of its context; both its physical environment and psychological purpose' as Butcher says in his recent catalogue, Time Trial. 'As soon as I started to consider the intersections between surfaces and the wall, I was naturally, logically led to a consideration of the whole environmental context of the work and hence to site-specificity.' This mirrors his approach to the objects he works with, the 'relationship between the painted surface and the object (upon which one surface has been singled out for preferential treatment), between 'surface' and 'objectness'.

Although the components of these installations appear to 'cling to the wall', the evidence of their fixings are increasingly integral to the installation, 'how a piece fixes to the wall, its method of construction, the way in which the work is joined and adhered to its backing; I want this to be clear and evident. Bolts and fixings are used which in some cases pierce the painted surfaces'.

=== Paperworks ===
GR.578 Blind embossed paper with cutouts.

As a consequence of this preoccupation with installation, some of Butcher's most recent pieces, his works on paper, experiment diagrammatically with possible arrangements for his large-scale installations of aluminium pieces, 'they repeat the principle of the aluminium works in their own specific way' introducing elements of chance. In these paper works, impressions of metal plates are embossed into sheets of saturated paper by running it through a printing press. Some sections of the plates’ impressions are then highlighted by ink, whereas some sections are cut out altogether – some left purely as a trace. 'These interventions take place separated from one another, yet may also intertwine. Through these perforations, the wall which is behind the deckle edged paper becomes a component of the work and takes on a bigger or smaller role depending on the size and quantity of perforations'. Butcher refers to this register of trace in his paper works as speaking, metaphorically, of loss and absence.

Shortly after the death of his father, Butcher created a series of works from gunpowder residue and clay on burnt paper. These found 'drawings' were from 'spent fireworks cartridges from a beach display [that] had been casually tossed into the sea'. 'Eric started to gather them up for more suitable disposal. Then he became interested in how the spent energy had left its marks, especially as those traces were – in line with the aims of his wider practice – free from the subjectivity of creative decision making'. Butcher states how 'the absence of something no longer present coupled with enormous pressure (in the case of the embossed pieces) or heat (in the case of the firework pieces) I find very suggestive and full of implications. On a metaphorical level they speak of loss and spent energy'.

The artist is also re-evaluating his own resources through his use of paper, taking environmental concerns into the work itself. As he says in the Time Trial catalogue, '[in] trying to consume less, tread more lightly on the planet, it would be curiously contradictory not to impose the same logic of questioning on my work. Aluminium production is an energy intensive business, so I am increasingly using recycled and reused materials'.

== Exhibition history ==
Year	Selected Solo Exhibitions	Gallery/Museum
2022	An End Always Has a Start	Saturation Point, London
2020	Sweet Heresy	Patrick Heide Contemporary Art, London
2018	Artificial Light	Nancy Toomey Fine Art, San Francisco, USA
2015	Data Capture	Patrick Heide Contemporary Art, London
2013	A Synthetic Kind of Love	Galerie Robert Drees, Hannover, Germany
2010	Material Witness	Toomey-Tourell gallery, San Francisco, USA
2007	Honey Trap	Toomey-Tourell gallery, San Francisco, USA
2007	Static Interference	Vertigo gallery, London
2005	Hanging Garden	Text + Work, the Art Institute at Bournemouth
2005	Arte Fiera	Vertigo gallery, Bologna, Italy
2004	Carbon Candy	Vertigo gallery, London
2003	Arcs + Surfaces	Vertigo gallery, London
2002	Cusp (two-person with Rebecca McLynn)	Sarah Myerscough Fine Art, London
2000	A Line of Enquiry	The Loading Bay, London
1999	The Antidote	The Loading Bay, London
1997	New Paintings	Concord Sylvania, London
1997	The Painted Figure (two-person with Gabriel Schmitz)	Hirschl Contemporary Art, London
1995	Lingering in Chambers of the Sea	The Acorn gallery, Liverpool
1995	New Paintings	Gallery 28, Reading
1993	Coming Up for Air	Engert Haus, Munich, Germany
1991	Beata Clarisa	Corpus Christi College, Cambridge

=== Group exhibitions ===
Eric Butcher has participated in many group shows including "The Waterlilly Foundation", Cambridge Guildhall (1994), "The Genitals Are Beauty", The House of William Blake, London (1995), "The Art Experience", The Atrium Gallery, London (1997), "Wall to Wall", Sarah Myerscough Fine Art, London (2002), "Paperwork" and "30 x 30", Vertigo Gallery, London (2003), "Surface", Vertigo Gallery (2004), the touring exhibition "Definite Article" with Roger Ackling, Marc Vaux and Cathy Wade, Vertigo gallery, London and Toomey-Tourell gallery, San Francisco, USA (2005/6), "Meeting Place - Contemporary Art and the Museum Collection", Russell-Cotes Art Gallery & Museum, Bournemouth and the Arts Institute at Bournemouth (curated by Stephanie James & Jackie Serafopoulos) (2007), "Underground", Shoreditch Town Hall basement, London (three-person with Roger Ackling and Simón Granell) (2007), "Ten", Toomey-Tourell gallery, San Francisco, USA (2008), "Über Flächen", Galerie Robert Drees, Hannover, Germany (2010), "Raw", Pertwee, Anderson & Gold, London, (2011), "Beyond the Commission", The Gallery, Arts University College Bournemouth (2011), "One Thing Leads to Another", Portland House, Malvern (2011), "The Devil Finds Work for Idle Hands", Toomey-Tourell gallery, San Francisco, USA (2012), "ReGroup", Red Space, London (2012).

Group exhibitions 2013—2020 include the touring exhibition "A Machine Aesthetic", Gallery North Northumbria University, Newcastle; The Gallery, AUB, Bournemouth; Project Space Plus, University of Lincoln; The Gallery, Norwich University of the Arts; Transition Gallery, London, "Down to Zero", Patrick Heide Contemporary Art, London (curated by Michael Roberts), "(Detail)", H Project Space, Bangkok, Thailand; Usher Gallery, Lincoln; Transition gallery, London (curated by Andrew Bracey) (2014), "An Einem Tisch - Contemporary Geometrical Abstraction", Galerie Robert Drees, Hannover, Germany, "Beyond Gravity II", Galerie und Kunstcabinett Corona Unger, Bremen, Germany (2016), "OVADA Seven Counties Open", OVADA Warehouse, Oxford, "The Jerwood Drawing Prize", Jerwood Space, London, East Gallery, Norwich, The Edge, Bath, Sidney Cooper Gallery, Canterbury Vane Gallery, Newcastle-upon-Tyne, "Mardi Gras Requiem", Project Space Plus, Lincoln (2017), "Intensity", the House of St. Barnabas, London (curated by Paul Carey-Kent), "Einsnullnull", Galerie Robert Drees, Hannover, Germany (2018), "Everything but Canvas", Galerie Robert Drees, Hannover, Germany (2019), and "Invited By", Galerie Robert Drees, Hannover, Germany (2019/20).

Group exhibitions 2022/23 include “Accrochage" // [akrɔˈʃaːʒə], Galerie Robert Drees, Hanover, Germany (2022), "Royal Academy Summer Exhibition” (Curated by Grayson Perry), Royal Academy of Arts, London (2022), "An Exhibition of Small Things with Big Ideas", White Conduit Projects, London (2022), "Derwent Art Prize", OXO Gallery, London (2022). "Perpetual Arrival", Platform A Gallery, Middlesbrough (2023), "I Want You to Panic", Zuleika Gallery, Woodstock (2023), "Curated at Dorfold: British Art Then and Now", Dorfold Hall, Cheshire (2023), "The New Accelerator", Ruskin Gallery, ARU, Cambridge (2023), "Die Wat Spaart, Die Wat Heeft", Galerie Robert Drees, Hanover, Germany (2023), "A Territory of Oneself", Zembla Gallery, Hawick, Scotland (2023).

Group exhibitions 2024—present "Group Exhibition Brussels", Patrick Heide Contemporary Art, Brussels, Belgium (2024), "Update #Summer", Galerie Drees, Hanover, Germany (2024), "Taking Time", The Cut, Halesworth (2024), "Royal Academy Summer Exhibition” (Curated by Cornelia Parker), Royal Academy of Arts, London (2024). "Trinity Buoy Wharf Drawing Prize", Buoy Store, Trinity Buoy Wharf, London; Salisbury Museum; Falmouth Art Gallery, Drawing Projects UK, Dundee; Manchester Waterside Gallery (2024/25), "Contemporary British Painting Prize", BayArt Gallery, Cardiff; Thames-Side Studios Gallery, London; Huddersfield Art Gallery Curates at Yorkshire Artspace: Persistence Works, Sheffield (2024/25). "A Bell is a Cup Until it is Struck", BLOC Projects, Sheffield (2025), "Colour Rush", Poimena Gallery, Launceston, Tasmania, Australia (2025), "40 Dimensions", &Gallery, Edinburgh (2025), "RWA Biennial Open 2025: Paperworks", Royal West of England Academy, Bristol (2025), "John Ruskin Art Prize", Buoy Store, Trinity Buoy Wharf, London (2025).

== Curating ==
Butcher's creative practice has also embraced curating; initiating exhibitions/projects including Emission (2001), Definite Article (2005/6), Underground (2007), The Devil Finds Work for Idle Hands (2012) and A Machine Aesthetic (2013/14). A Machine Aesthetic (co-curated with Simón Granell), was a major national touring exhibition presenting the work of 11 contemporary British artists whose creative practices engaged with the concept of mechanisation. The exhibition explored the various manifestations, uses and influences of different aspects of mechanisation within the practices of an otherwise diverse group of artists (with Andrew Bracey, Eric Butcher, David Connearn, Rob Currie, Paul Goodfellow, Simón Granell, Emma Hart (artist), Dan Hays, Natasha Kidd, Tim Knowles, Michael Roberts). In conjunction with the exhibition, the curators guest edited an edition of the arts and culture magazine Garageland (issue XVI: Machines), which was themed to coincide with the show.

The Devil Finds Work for Idle Hands explored the materiality of paper with work by six contemporary artists (Rana Begum, Michael Brown, Eric Butcher, Simón Granell, Natasha Kidd, John Lavell). It was an exhibition of artists who work with paper; with each artist making work exploiting properties intrinsic to the material.
