= National Constitution Center =

American history museum in Philadelphia, Pennsylvania, USA

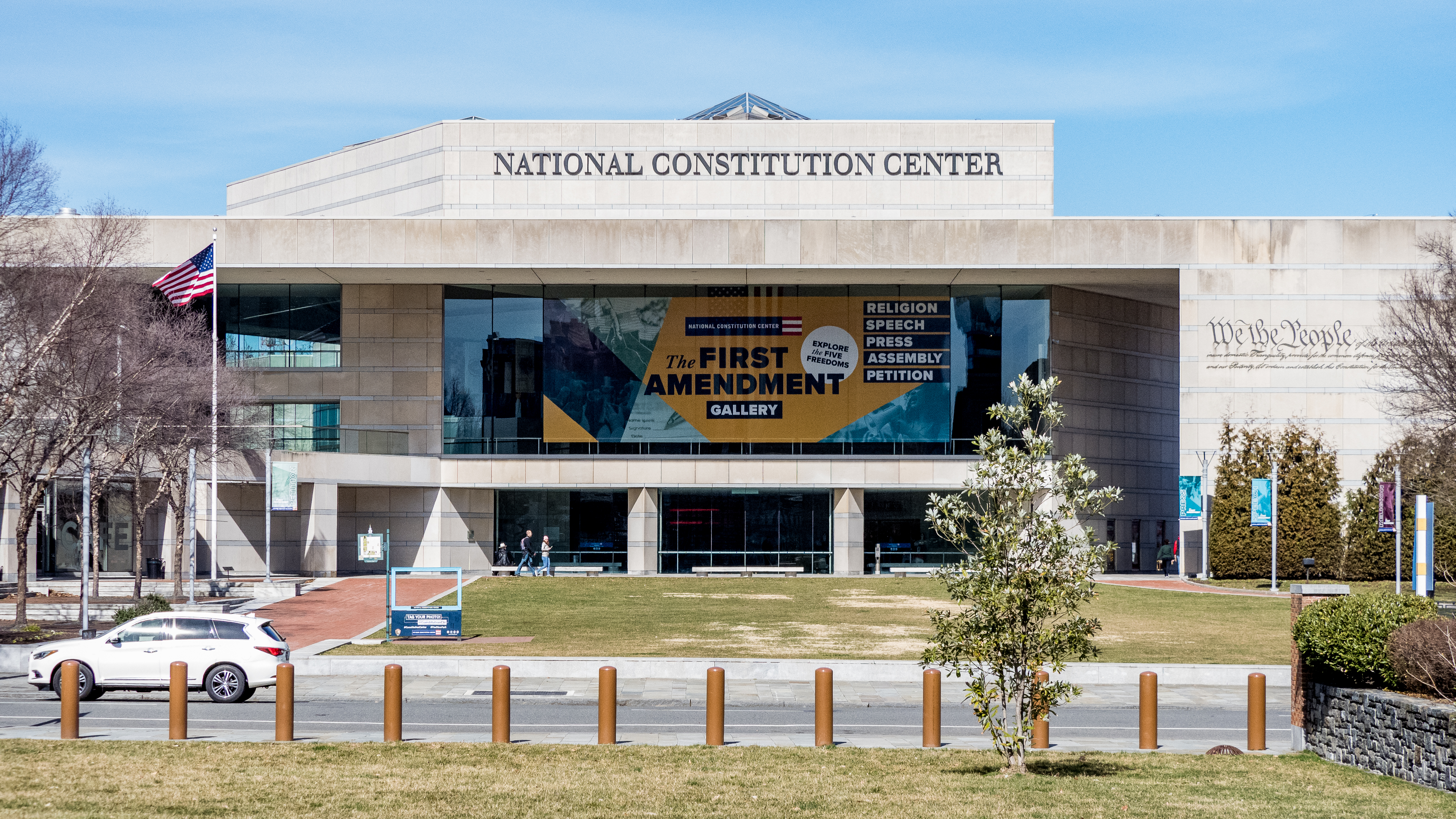
- Exterior of the National Constitution Center in Philadelphia in 2024

- Location of the National Constitution Center in Pennsylvania
- Established: September 17, 2000
- Location: Independence National Historical Park, Philadelphia, Pennsylvania, U.S.
- Coordinates: 39.9536°N 75.1491°W
- Type: History museum
- Visitors: 817,000 (2011)
- Director: Vince Stango (interim)
- Public transit access: 5th Street/Independence Hall; PATCO Franklin Square; SEPTA: 38, 44, 48; Philly PHLASH
- Website: constitutioncenter.org

The National Constitution Center is an American non-profit institution that is devoted to the study of the Constitution of the United States. Located at Independence Mall in Philadelphia, Pennsylvania, the center is an interactive museum which serves as a national town hall, hosting government leaders, journalists, scholars, and celebrities who engage in public discussions, including Constitution-related events and presidential debates.

The groundbreaking ceremony was held on September 17, 2000, the 213th anniversary of the signing of the Constitution. The center opened on July 4, 2003, joining other historic sites and attractions inside Independence National Historical Park, frequently called "America's most historic square mile", because of its proximity to Independence Hall and the Liberty Bell. The center offers civic learning resources onsite and online. It does not house the original Constitution, which is stored at the National Archives Building in Washington, D.C.

== Background ==
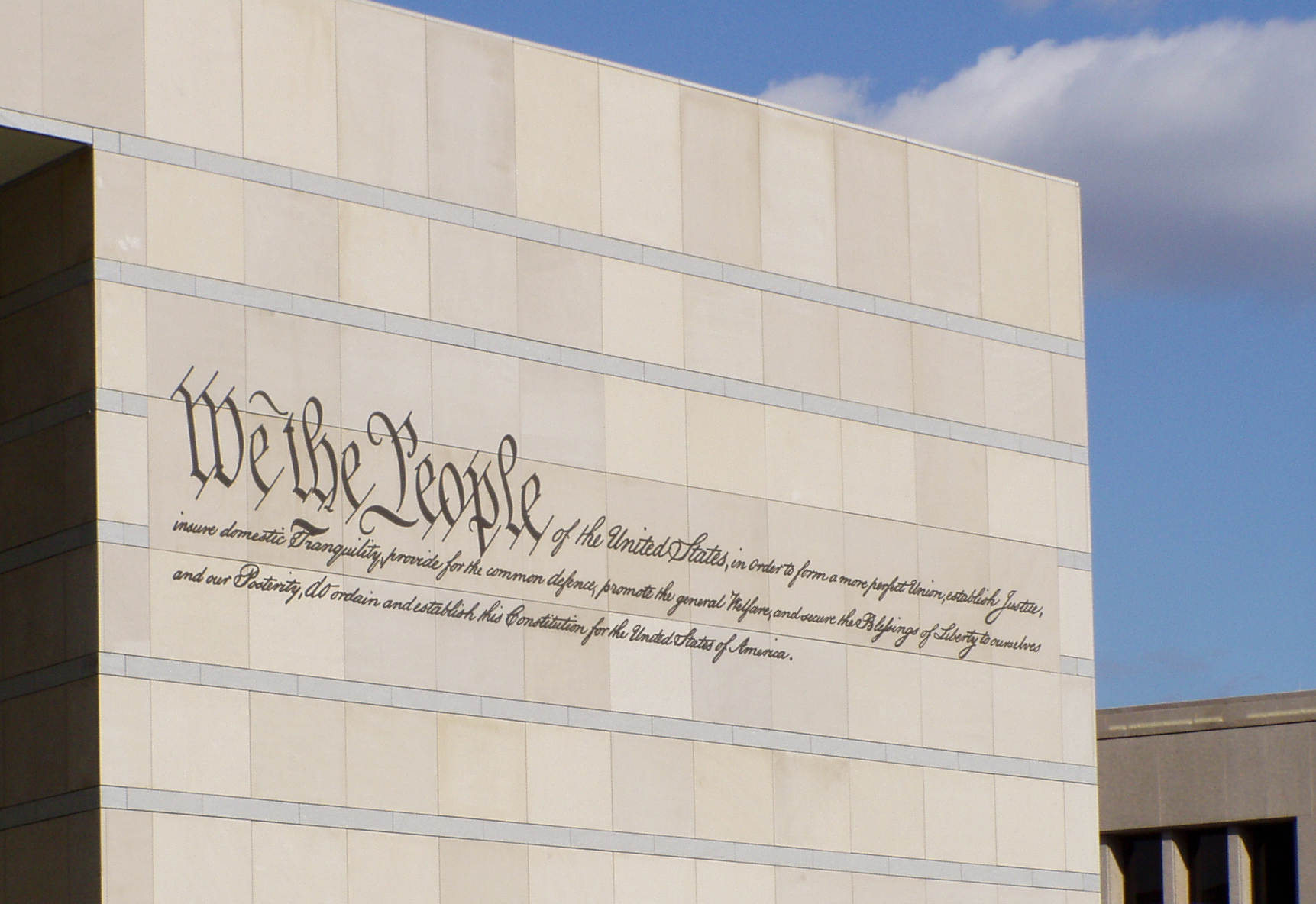
"We the People" inscription at the National Constitution Center

The center was created by the Constitution Heritage Act. Approved on September 16, 1988, and signed by President Ronald Reagan, the act defined the National Constitution Center as "within or in close proximity to Independence National Historical Park. The Center shall disseminate information about the United States Constitution on a non-partisan basis in order to increase the awareness and understanding of the Constitution among the American people." The center is at 525 Arch Street, an address chosen because May 25 (5/25) was the date that the Constitutional Convention began in Philadelphia.

The architectural firm of Pei Cobb Freed & Partners designed the center, and Leslie E. Robertson Associates were the structural engineers for the project. Witold Rybczynski of The New York Times wrote, "Quiet but assertive, respectful of its surroundings, considerate of its public, this building is destined to take its place among the nation's leading public monuments."

Ralph Appelbaum Associates designed the center's visitor experience and exhibition hall. The public space is 160,000 square feet (15,000 m^{2}), including galleries. The center has 75,785 square feet (7,040.7 m^{2}) of exhibit space. The center is made of American products, including 85,000 square feet (7,900 m^{2}) of Indiana limestone, 2.6 million pounds of steel, and a half-million cubic feet of concrete. Construction of the center was overseen by project manager Hill International.

Prior to its closure in December 2019, the Newseum, a journalism-themed museum in Washington D.C., had featured a four-story-tall stone panel inscribed with the text of the First Amendment as part of its exterior design. The Freedom Forum, a nonprofit organization that created the museum, announced in March 2021 that the panel would be dismantled and donated to the National Constitution Center for display in its second-floor atrium.

== Leadership ==
Jeffrey Rosen served as the president and chief executive officer of the center from 2013 until stepping down in January 2026. Vice President Vince Stango serves as the interim president and CEO and Rosen will serve as CEO Emeritus.

The honorary board chairs of the center include:

Chairman	Period
John C. Bogle	1999–2007
George H. W. Bush	2007–2009
Bill Clinton	2009–2012
Jeb Bush	2013–2017
Joe Biden	2017–2019
Neil Gorsuch	co-chair
Stephen G. Breyer	co-chair

== Civic education ==
Through its Annenberg Center for Education and Outreach, the center offers onsite and online civic-education programs and a study center which develops and distributes teaching tools, lesson plans and resources.

== Public engagement ==
The center has hosted several debates, including a 2008 Democratic presidential primary debate between Hillary Clinton and Barack Obama, a town hall meeting with Senator John McCain, and a 2006 Pennsylvania Senatorial debate between Republican incumbent Rick Santorum and Democratic challenger Bob Casey.

The center hosted the second 2024 Presidential debate on September 10, 2024. It was the first debate between Donald Trump and Kamala Harris, after President Joe Biden exited the race in the weeks following the first debate of the cycle. It was also the first time Harris and Trump had met.

== Liberty Medal ==
In 2006, the center became home to the Philadelphia Liberty Medal, an annual award established in 1988 to recognize "men and women of courage and conviction who strive to secure the blessings of liberty to people around the globe."

== Reception ==
George Will wrote for The Washington Post, "At the other end of the mall sparkles a modernist jewel of America's civic life, the National Constitution Center". Jason DeParle wrote for The New York Times Learning Network, "Since opening in 2003, [the National Constitution Center] has put forward a vision of constitutional history both left and right have embraced." According to The Philadelphia Inquirer, "The National Constitution Center has established itself as one of the city's cultural celebs, attracting a million visitors a year, putting pizzazz into civic and educational offerings, hosting blockbuster exhibitions, and attracting the nation's intellectual cognoscenti and media elite like bears to honey."

== Gallery ==
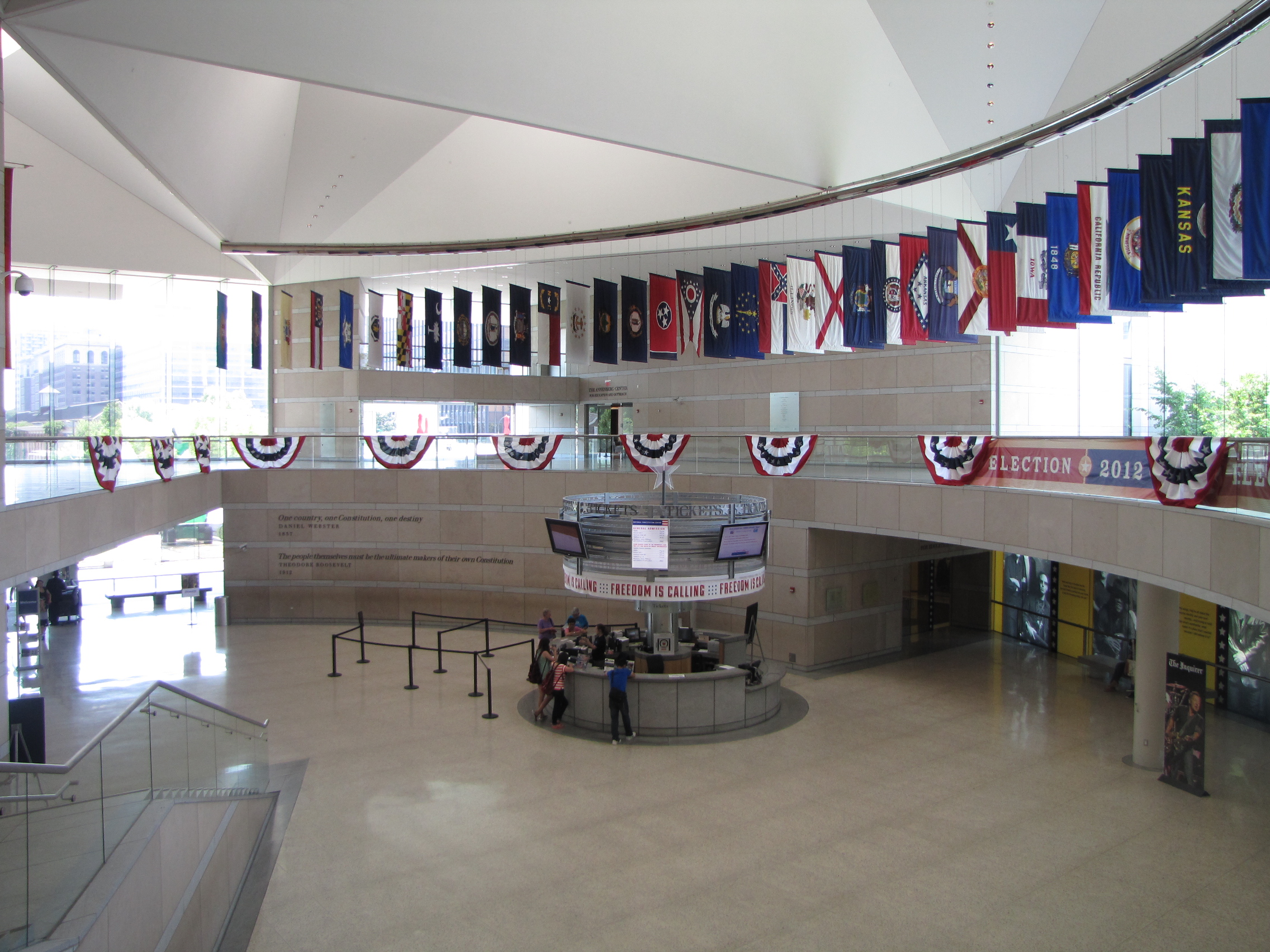
State flags in the lobby

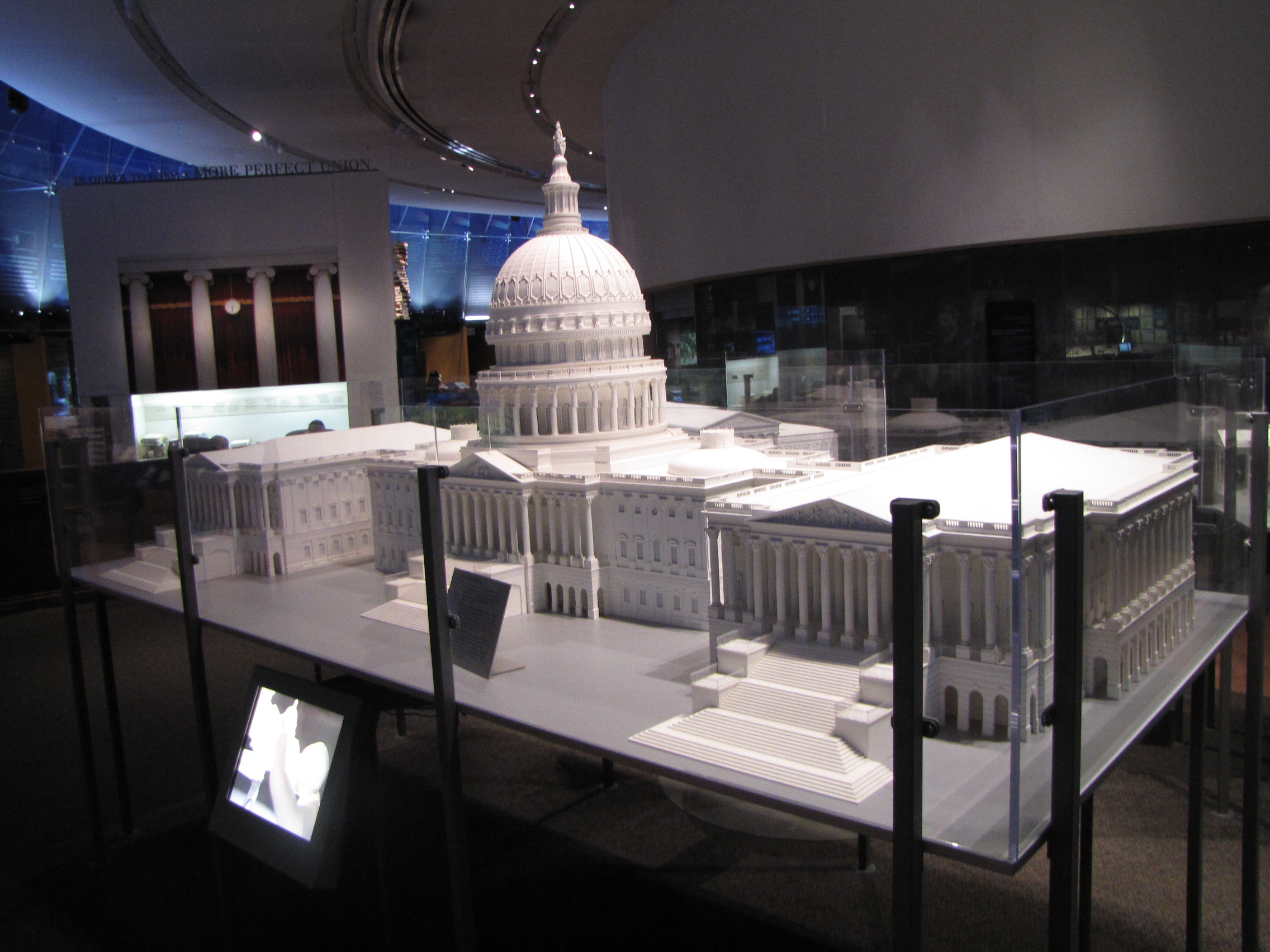
Exhibits

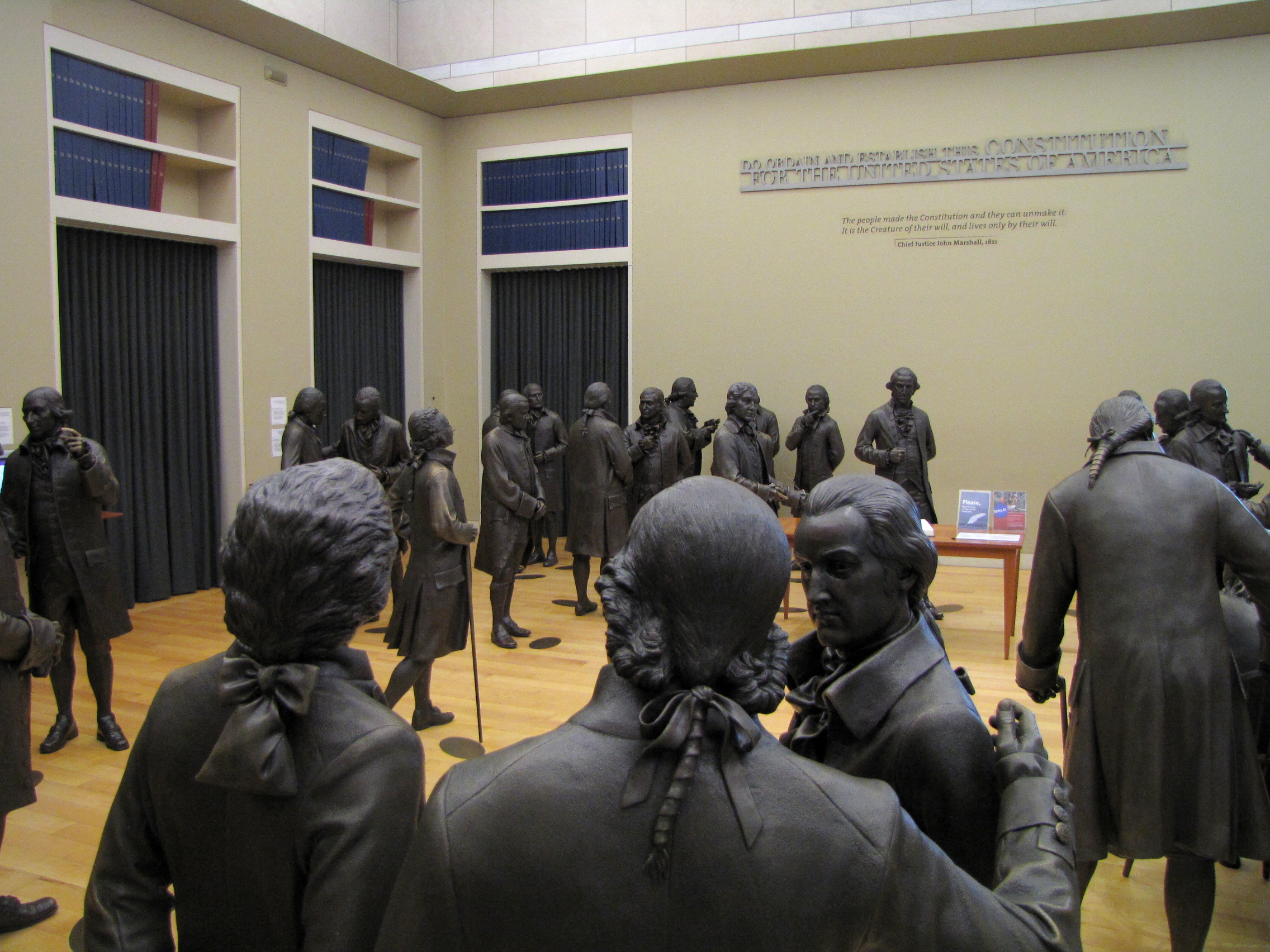
Life-sized statues of the signers of the Constitution in Signers' Hall

== See also ==
- Philadelphia Liberty Medal – An annual award administered by the Center
- Constitution Day (United States)
- Independence National Historical Park
- Founding Fathers of the United States
- Landmark Cases: Historic Supreme Court Decisions, 2015 TV series
