= Mohammad Khalil =

Mohammad Khalil may refer to:

- Mohammad Khalil (cricketer), Pakistani cricketer
- Mohammad Aslam Khan Khalil, Indian physicist
- Mohammad Hassan Khalil, American professor
- Mohammad Hasan Khalil al-Hakim, Pakistani terrorist
- Mohammad Khalil Naik, Kashmiri politician
- Mohamed Khalil, Egpytian water polo player
- Mohammed Khalil, Palestinian footballer

== See also ==
- Mahmoud Khalil (disambiguation)
