= Kate Shaw =

American lawyer

Kate A. Shaw

Personal details
- Born: Katherine Ann Shaw Chicago, U.S.
- Spouse: Chris Hayes (m. 2007)
- Children: 3
- Education: Brown University (BA); Northwestern University (JD)

Katherine Ann Shaw is a professor of law at the University of Pennsylvania Law School, a Supreme Court contributor for ABC News, and co-host of the podcast Strict Scrutiny.

== Education ==
Shaw graduated from Brown University in 2001 with a Bachelor of Arts in religious studies and gender studies. She then went on to Northwestern University School of Law, graduating first in her class in 2006 with a Juris Doctor magna cum laude and Order of the Coif. She was editor-in-chief of the Northwestern University Law Review and won the John Paul Stevens Award at Northwestern.

== Career ==
After graduating from law school in 2006, Shaw clerked for Judge Richard A. Posner in the U.S. Court of Appeals for the Seventh Circuit and then for U.S. Supreme Court Justice John Paul Stevens. From 2009 to 2011, Shaw worked at the White House Counsel's Office during the Obama administration. Shaw was a member of the Benjamin N. Cardozo School of Law faculty from 2011 to 2023, where she taught Administrative Law, Constitutional Law, and courses on the Supreme Court, legislation, antitrust, and gender and reproductive rights. She joined the University of Pennsylvania Law School in January 2024. She is a member of the Administrative Conference of the United States (ACUS) and the National Task Force on Election Crises.

== Media commentary ==
Professor Shaw has worked for ABC News as an analyst of the Supreme Court since 2015. Her legal and political commentary has also appeared in publications including the New York Times, The Atlantic, and the Washington Post. Shaw has commented on shifts in American jurisprudence, political machinations in Washington and national security, and Supreme Court affairs. In an interview by New York Times podcast correspondent Ezra Klein in July 2022, Shaw explained the historical rightward shift in jurisprudence and conservative political strategies that led to the current ultraconservative Supreme Court.

During the first Trump administration, Shaw commented on various forms of legal jeopardy faced by the then-President: legal challenges to president's substantive policy initiatives (e.g., DACA, the Muslim travel ban, and environmental policy changes); investigations into members of the cabinet and White House staff; and Trump's personal legal exposure, in a podcast interview. She also wrote about the dangers of Trump's political speech leading up to the 2020 election, and about the causes of the January 6th riots.

Shaw has co-hosted the podcast Strict Scrutiny, along with fellow legal academics Leah Litman and Melissa Murray, since 2019. The podcast analyzes and critiques recent Supreme Court cases, providing historical context and political commentary on the likely impacts of the Court's decisions. In 2022, the podcast joined the Crooked Media network.

== Scholarship ==
Shaw is a prolific legal scholar and her work has appeared in law journals such as the Cornell Law Review, Columbia Law Review, Michigan Law Review, Georgetown Law Journal, Texas Law Review, and Northwestern University Law Review.

In a 2022 article, Shaw criticized the United States Electoral College for its distorting effects on democracy, laid out possible reforms, and argued for its abolition. In other commentary, Shaw has argued that the January 6 riots would not have taken place in the absence of the Electoral College.

Shaw has also written about gender and reproductive rights. She recently co-edited a book about judicial decisions on reproductive rights, including cases related to pregnancy, abortion and forced sterilization. Among other subjects, she has also written about felony disenfranchisement in Florida and campaign finance disclosure.

== Personal life ==
Shaw met Chris Hayes, now a television host at MS NOW, when they were both undergraduates at Brown University. They married in 2007. Shaw and Hayes lived in Washington, D.C., before moving to New York City, where All In with Chris Hayes is produced. They have three children.

Her father is veteran Chicago reporter Andy Shaw, who also worked for ABC News.
