= Leah Litman =

American lawyer and academic

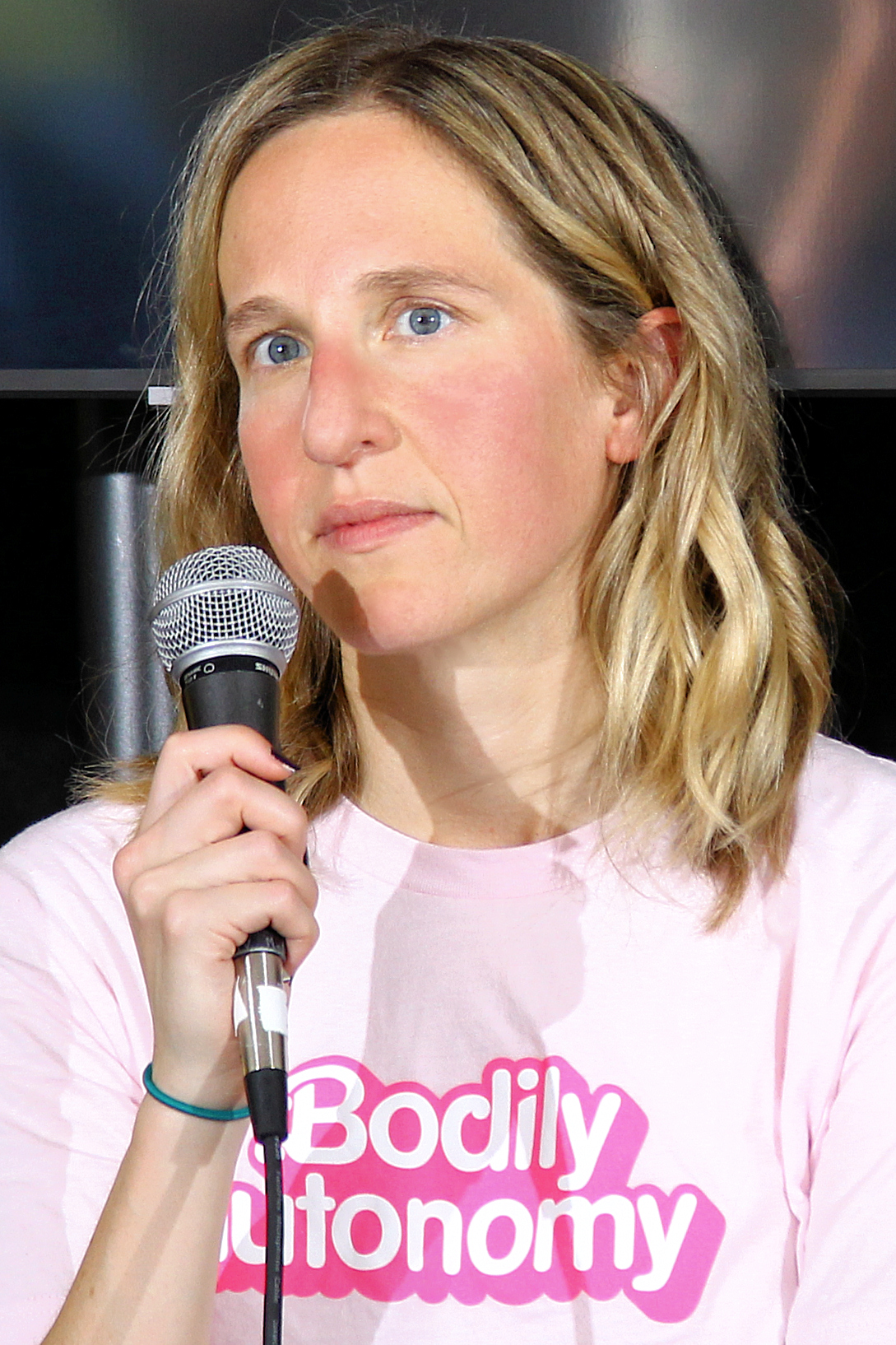
- Litman in 2023
- Born: December 13, 1984 (age 41)
- Education: Harvard University (BA); University of Michigan (JD)
- Political party: Democratic
- Partner: Daniel Deacon

Leah Litman (born December 13, 1984) is a professor of law at the University of Michigan Law School. Litman is a co-host of Strict Scrutiny, a podcast about the Supreme Court of the United States, alongside Melissa Murray and Kate A. Shaw.

== Education ==
Litman received a Bachelor of Arts degree with a major in chemistry and chemical biology from Harvard College in 2006 and a Juris Doctor degree (summa cum laude) from the University of Michigan Law School in 2010. While in law school, she was editor-in-chief of the Michigan Law Review and won the Henry M. Bates Memorial Scholarship Award.

== Career ==
Litman became a Research Associate at Bancroft Associates PLLC in 2006. She was a law clerk to Judge Jeffrey Sutton on the Sixth Circuit from 2010 to 2011 and then for Justice Anthony Kennedy on the Supreme Court of the United States from 2011 to 2012.

Litman became an Associate at WilmerHale in 2012. She then became a Climenko Fellow at Harvard Law School in 2014. She became an assistant professor of law at University of California, Irvine School of Law in 2016, teaching constitutional law, post-conviction review/habeas corpus, and federal courts. In 2019, Litman joined the University of Michigan Law School, first as an assistant professor of law and then as a professor of law in 2022. In 2021, Litman was awarded the L. Hart Wright Teaching Award from Michigan Law students. Litman also was a visiting assistant professor in the Supreme Court Litigation Clinic at Stanford Law School. In 2023, Litman received the Ruth Bader Ginsburg Scholar Award from the American Constitution Society.

== Commentary ==
Litman has co-hosted the podcast Strict Scrutiny, along with fellow legal academics Kate A. Shaw and Melissa Murray, since 2019. The podcast analyzes and critiques recent Supreme Court cases, providing historical context and political commentary on the likely impacts of the Court's decisions.

In 2025, NetGalley published an advance reader copy of Lawless: How the Supreme Court Came to Run on Conservative Grievance, Fringe Theories, and... Bad Vibes and a TIME magazine article critical of the Roberts Court which enabled the Trump administration's retrenchment efforts in the Department of Government Efficiency. Litman has authored law examination study essays, state law essays, international relations articles, and constitutional law articles. Professor Litman writes on constitutional law, federal post-conviction review, and federal sentencing.

Litman frequently makes written commentary contributions and appearances on MSNow, CNN, The Guardian, The New York Times, Crooked Media and others on legal matters relating to the Supreme Court’s pending dockets and cases.

== Notable cases ==
In 2016, Litman was part of the litigation team in Whole Woman's Health v. Hellerstedt. The case was decided in the US Supreme Court in a 5–3 ruling. The opinion stated Texas cannot place restrictions on the delivery of abortion services that create an undue burden for women seeking an abortion.

In 2019, Litman was part of the litigation team in Hernandez v. Mesa. The case centered on the 2010 shooting of Sergio Hernández Guereca, an unarmed Mexican national boy on the Mexican side of the Mexico–United States border. He was shot and killed by United States Border Patrol Agent Jesus Mesa, who was patrolling the border by bicycle. The Supreme Court ruled against Hernández's family 5-4.

In 2022, Litman was part of the litigation team in Garcia v. United States. The lawsuit successfully challenged the rescission of the Deferred Action for Childhood Arrivals (DACA) program.

Litman also served as a co-counsel representative for plaintiffs in Ramirez Medina v. Asher, Jane Doe v. Trump Corporation, and E. Jean Carroll v. Donald J. Trump

== See also ==
- List of law clerks for the first seat of the Supreme Court of the United States
