= Sujit Choudhry =

Lawyer and legal scholar

- Born: 1970 (age 55–56); New Delhi, India
- Education: McGill University (BSc); University of Oxford (B.A.); University of Toronto (LL.B.); Harvard Law School (LL.M.)
- Occupations: Lawyer, legal scholar
- Years active: 1996–present
- Awards: Rhodes Scholarship; Cecelia Goetz Professorship; William E. Taylor Memorial Fellowship; Frank Knox Memorial Fellowship

Dean of UC Berkeley School of Law
- In office 2014–2016
- Preceded by: Gillian Lester (Interim Dean)
- Succeeded by: Melissa Murray (Interim Dean)

Sujit Choudhry is a lawyer, legal scholar, and expert in comparative constitutional law.

Choudhry was on the faculty at the University of Toronto and New York University School of Law before being named dean University of California, Berkeley School of Law. He stepped down from his position as dean in 2016 after being accused of sexually harassing an executive assistant, which he denied, paying a $100,000 settlement but retaining his position on the faculty.

== Early life ==
Choudhry was born in New Delhi in 1970. He went to the University of Toronto Schools for high school. He received a BSc in biology from McGill University in 1992, a B.A. (with first-class honors) in Law from the University of Oxford's University College, in 1994, before attending the University of Toronto, graduating with an LL.B. (with honors) in 1996, and an LL.M. from Harvard Law School in 1998. He was a Rhodes Scholar at the University of Oxford, and had a Frank Knox Memorial Fellowship from Harvard University and the William E. Taylor Memorial Fellowship from the Social Sciences and Humanities Research Council of Canada (SSHRC).

== Legal career ==
=== Early career ===
Choudhry joined the faculty of the University of Toronto in 1999 and received tenure in 2004. As of 2006 he was professor and the Scholl chair in law at the University of Toronto. From 2008 to 2011 he served as associate dean. Choudhry left the University of Toronto in 2011 when he was hired by New York University. At NYU, Choudhry was the Cecelia Goetz Professor of Law and the faculty director of the Center for Constitutional Transitions in 2012.

=== UC Berkeley and sexual harassment lawsuit ===
In June 2014, Choudhry became Dean of Law at the University of California, Berkeley School of Law, where he was also named the I. Michael Heyman Professor of Law. In March 2015, he was accused of sexual harassment by his executive assistant, Tyann Sorrell. Choudhry denied sexually harassing Sorrell, but acknowledged giving hugs and kisses without sexual intent. The university's office for the prevention of harassment and discrimination concluded that Choudhry's behavior had violated campus sexual harassment policies, and also said sexual intent was not required to demonstrate a violation. In March 2016, Sorrell filed a sexual harassment lawsuit against Choudhry in the Alameda County Superior Court, and against the Regents of the University of California for their failure to respond effectively to her complaint against Choudhry. Choudhry thereafter went on an indefinite leave of absence from his position as dean, but continued to remain a member of faculty. His return to the Berkeley campus in September 2016 as a member of faculty was met by a student protest. The lawsuit resulted in settlement agreements, under which Choudhry agreed to pay a total of $50,000 to Sorrell's attorneys, a contribution that his lawyer William Taylor called "relatively minimal." Choudhry also agreed to pay $50,000 to charities of Sorrell's choice. The university terminated the disciplinary process, and Choudhry was permitted to remain a member of the faculty "in good standing", until he "voluntarily" resigned the following year. Choudhry sued Berkeley, alleging racial discrimination, but dropped the complaint following the settlement.

=== Notable cases ===
In 2005, Choudhry helped to draft a letter to the Canadian Parliament arguing that a proposal to outlaw same-sex marriage was unconstitutional.

In 2021, Choudhry represented Canadian author Joel Bakan in a lawsuit against Twitter, claiming Twitter's refusal to publish a paid tweet promoting Bakan's documentary The Corporation violated Bakan's free speech rights; Choudhry also sued the Canadian government for failing to issue regulations that protect constitutional freedom of speech on technology platforms. In 2023, the Ontario Superior Court ruled against Twitter's attempt to have the case thrown out.

In 2021, Choudhry represented seven families in a citizenship case challenging the constitutionality of a 2009 change in the Canadian Citizenship Act. He argued that the law unconstitutionally cut off birthright citizenship to children born abroad to Canadian parents who were also born outside Canada, effectively making the children stateless persons.

Choudhry also participated in the Public Order Emergency Commission hearing of Trudeau's actions in October 2022. He cross-examined the Prime Minister about his decision to invoke the Emergencies Act. Choudhry questioned Trudeau on whether he properly disclosed information about deliberations leading to the decision.

== Scholarship ==
Choudhry is an author of the books The Migration of Constitutional Ideas, Dilemmas of Solidarity, Constitutional Design for Divided Societies, Oxford Handbook of the Indian Constitution, Constitution-Making, Territory and Power in Constitutional Transitions and Security Sector Reform in Constitutional Transitions.

Choudhry co-authored a report titled "Semi-Presidentialism and Inclusive Governance in Ukraine" with Thomas Sedelius and Julia Kyrychenko which was presented in April 2018 before Ukrainian constitutional experts in Kyiv. He is the Director of the Center for Constitutional Transitions.

== Academic service ==
Choudhry was also a recipient of the Trudeau Fellowship and the South Asian Bar Associations of Southern California (SABA-SC) and Northern California (SABA-NC) each awarded him the "Trailblazer Award".

In 2010, the Trudeau Foundation awarded Choudhry a Trudeau Fellowship. The South Asian Bar Association of Toronto named Choudhry Practitioner of the Year in 2011.

Choudhry is the Director of the Center for Constitutional Transitions. The Center for Constitutional Transitions partnered with the International Institute for Democracy and Electoral Assistance (International IDEA) on preparing a set of thematic research reports on constitutional design for Middle East and North Africa (MENA) post Arab Spring. The United Nations High Commissioner for Human Rights has cited Choudhry's work in its reports.

== Selected publications ==
- Choudhry, Sujit (23 August 2006). "Worse than Lochner?". Access to Care, Access to Justice: The Legal Debate over Private Health Insurance in Canada: 75–100. SSRN 925937.
- Sujit Choudhry (2006). The Migration of Constitutional Ideas. Cambridge University Press. ISBN 978-0521173476.
- Sujit Choudhry (2006). Dilemmas of Solidarity: Redistribution in the Canadian Federation. Toronto Press. ISBN 978-0802094070.
- Sujit Choudhry, Michael Pal (2007). Is every ballot equal? : visible-minority vote dilution in Canada. Institute for Research on Public Policy, Montreal. OCLC 246907471.
- Sujit Choudhry (2008). Constitutional Design for Divided Societies. Oxford University Press. ISBN 978-0-19-953541-5.
- Sujit Choudhry (2008). Multinational Federations, Constitutional Amendment and Secession.
- Choudhry, Sujit; Mehta, P. B.; Khosla, M. (2014). Oxford Handbook of the Indian Constitution. Oxford University Press.
- Choudhry, Sujit; Ginsburg, Tom (2017). Constitution Making. Edward Elgar Publishing.
- Sujit Choudhry (2019) Security Sector Reform and Constitutional Transitions (Oxford University Press).
- George Anderson & Sujit Choudhry (2019) Territory and Power in Constitutional Transitions (Oxford University Press).
- Sujit Choudhry, Michaela Hailbronner & Mattias Kumm (2024) Global Canons in an Age of Contestation: Debating Foundational Texts of Constitutional Democracy and Human Rights (Oxford University Press).
