= Elora Mukherjee =

American lawyer and academic

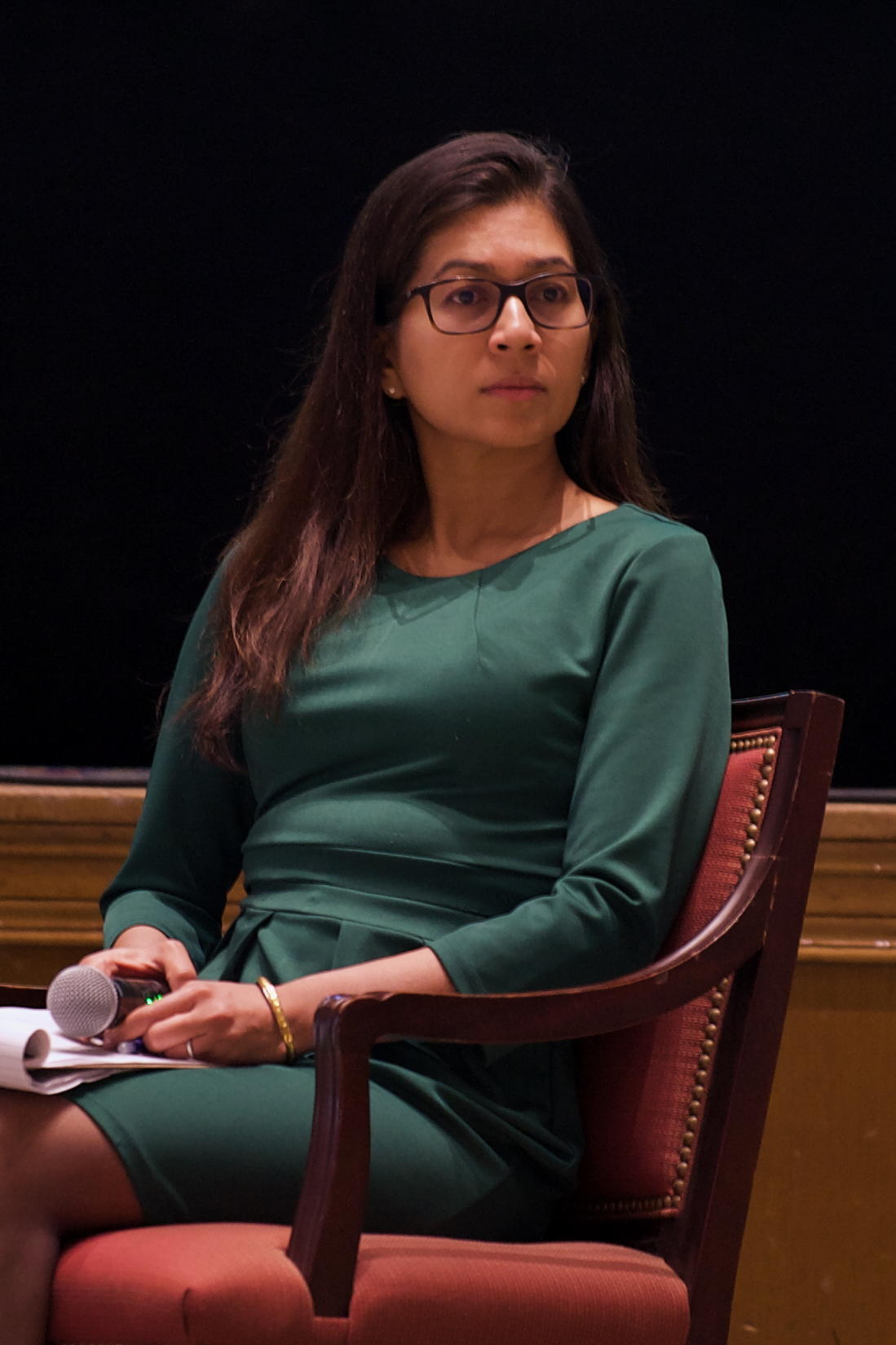
- Mukherjee speaking at the Knight First Amendment Institute in 2024
- Occupation: Law professor

Academic background
- Education: Rutgers University (BA); Yale University (JD)

Academic work
- Discipline: Law
- Sub-discipline: Immigration Law, Civil Rights, Human Rights, Discrimination
- Institutions: Columbia Law School

Elora Mukherjee is an American lawyer and academic. She is the Jerome L. Greene Clinical Professor of Law at Columbia Law School and directs the school's Immigrants' Rights Clinic.

== Career ==
After law school, Mukherjee clerked for Judge Jan E. DuBois. She then worked on racial justice matters for the American Civil Liberties Union. After finishing her fellowship there, she entered private practice for three years, where she focused on police misconduct, voting rights, and discrimination cases. Mukherjee then returned to the ACLU as a staff attorney for three years before joining Columbia Law School, where she founded the Immigrants’ Rights Clinic in 2014. In 2019, Mukherjee testified before the United States Congress regarding the Trump Administration's policies at the U.S.-Mexico Border.

== Personal life ==
Mukherjee is married to Jamal Greene, a constitutional law professor at Columbia Law School.
