= Jessica Calarco =

American sociologist and academic

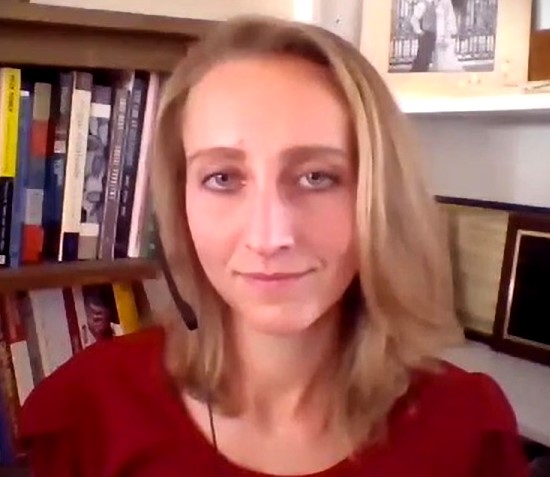
- Calarco in 2020
- Education: Brown University (BA); University of Pennsylvania (MA, PhD)
- Scientific career
- Workplaces: University of Wisconsin–Madison
- Thesis: Negotiating Opportunities: Social Class and Children’s Help-Seeking in Elementary School (2012)
- Website: www.jessicacalarco.com

Jessica McCrory Calarco is an American sociologist and a professor of sociology at the University of Wisconsin–Madison. Her research considers inequalities in education and family life. She has published four books, Negotiating Opportunities: How the Middle Class Secures Advantages in School (2018), A Field Guide to Grad School: Uncovering the Hidden Curriculum (2020), Qualitative Literacy: A Guide to Evaluating Ethnographic and Interview Research (2022), and Holding it Together: How Women Became America's Social Safety Net (2024).

== Early life and education ==
Calarco studied sociology and education at Brown University. She moved to the University of Pennsylvania for graduate studies, where she earned a master's degree and a doctorate in sociology. Her doctoral research looked at social class and how children look for help in elementary school. She then taught at Indiana University before moving to her current role at Wisconsin.

== Research and career ==
Calarco is interested in using ethnographic observations to understand K-12 teaching. She has studied how students secure unfair advantages in education, including how young people from privileged families are trained to negotiate with teachers and how students without computer access suffer as classes go online. Her research showed that middle class students consistently advocated for themselves, expecting exemptions from conventional rules and talking themselves out of difficult situations. On the other hand, working-class students expected consequences, accepted punishments and deferred to authority.

Calarco has studied how inequalities impact the decision making of families, including better understanding of how the COVID-19 pandemic impacts the paid work of parents.

== Awards ==
- 2019 Scholarly Achievement Award for Best Book
- 2020 Pierre Bourdieu Book Award
- 2021 Mumford Excellence in Extraordinary Teaching Award, Faculty Academy on Excellence in Teaching
- 2022 Trustees Teaching Award

== Selected publications ==
- Calarco, Jessica McCrory (2018). Negotiating opportunities : how the middle class secures advantages in school. New York, NY. ISBN 978-0-19-063444-5. OCLC 1006793182.
- Calarco, Jessica McCrory (2020). A field guide to grad school : uncovering the hidden curriculum. Princeton. ISBN 978-0-691-20109-2. OCLC 1142930093.
- Small, Mario Luis; Calarco, Jessica McCrory (2022). Qualitative literacy : a guide to evaluating ethnographic and interview research. Oakland, California. ISBN 978-0-520-39067-6. OCLC 1303569669.
- Calarco, Jessica (2024). Holding it together : how women became America's safety net. New York. ISBN 978-0-593-53812-8. OCLC 1419876201.
