= Garland Fund =

Defunct United States left wing organization

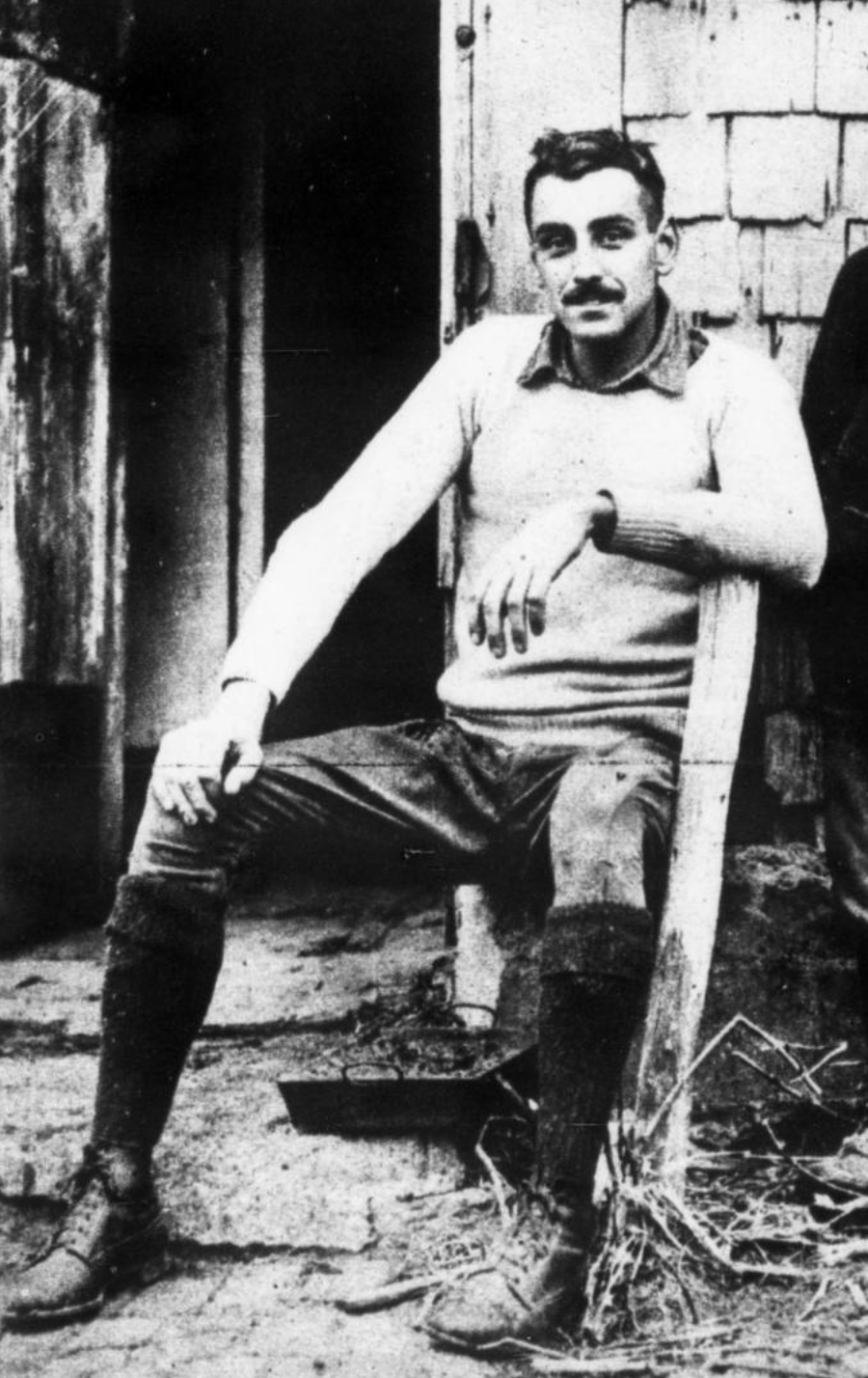
Portrait of Charles Garland from 1922, the year he endowed the fund

The American Fund for Public Service, commonly known as the Garland Fund, was a philanthropic organization established in 1922 by Charles Garland. The fund, administered by a group of trustees headed by Roger Baldwin of the American Civil Liberties Union, ultimately disbursed some $2 Million to a variety of radical and left wing institutions, including the Federated Press labor news service, the Vanguard Press publishing house, The New Masses magazine, The World Tomorrow magazine, and to the legal defense fund associated with the 1926 Passaic Textile Strike, as well as a host of similar projects. The fund was terminated in 1941.

== Institutional history ==
=== Establishment of the fund ===
In 1920, Charles Garland informed the executor of his father's estate that he would refuse to accept a $1 Million inheritance from the estate of his deceased father. Garland explained to a reporter at the time that he would not accept money from "a system which starves thousands while hundreds are stuffed" and which "leaves a sick woman helpless and offers its services to a healthy man." Garland indicated to this reporter that he was not refusing to accept these funds because of socialist beliefs, but rather because as part of his study of the teachings of Jesus Christ and the works of Leo Tolstoy and H.G. Wells, he had come to the earnest belief that the money "is not mine."

Hearing of the young man's decision to refuse his inheritance and his rationale, the socialist author Upton Sinclair urged Garland to accept the money not for his personal gain, but rather to put it to a higher use. Sinclair suggested making $100,000 donations to a set of specific organizations seeking to change the economic and social system of which Garland disapproved. These organizations favored by Sinclair included The Liberator magazine, the socialist daily newspaper The New York Call, the communist daily newspaper The Daily Worker, the Federated Press news service, the Intercollegiate Socialist Society, the American Civil Liberties Union, the American Union Against Militarism, and the magazine edited by 1916 Socialist Party Presidential candidate Allan L. Benson, Reconstruction. While Garland did not immediately take action upon this suggestion, it seems as though the idea of accepting the inheritance in the name of establishing a radical philanthropic organization derives from this time.

In 1921, Garland was approached by Roger Baldwin, head of the American Civil Liberties Union, probably through ACLU attorney Walter Nelles, a law partner of Swinburne Hale, who had recently married Garland's widowed mother. Baldwin convinced Garland to accept his father's inheritance and to establish with it a "national trust fund" which would aid efforts to expand "individual liberty and the power of voluntary associations."

On July 5, 1921, the American Fund for Public Service was formally incorporated by Lewis Gannett of the New York World, Robert Morss Lovett of the University of Chicago, and Roger Baldwin. In July 1922, it was formally announced that Garland would use $800,000 of his inheritance to endow the fund. The money behind the fund was held in the form of securities at the First National Bank of New York. In preparation for the task of distributing the funds, Roger Baldwin reached out to the Rockefeller, Carnegie, and Russell Sage foundations to determine how those philanthropies handled grant requests.

The board of directors included Roger Baldwin, H. H. Broach, Robert W. Dunn, Morris L. Ernst, Elizabeth Gurley Flynn, William Z. Foster, Lewis Gannett, Benjamin Gitlow, Clinton S. Golden, James Weldon Johnson, Freda Kirchwey, Clarina Michelson, Robert Morss Lovett, Scott Nearing, and Norman M. Thomas.

According to the James Weldon Johnsons's autobiography:

[Garland] was an uncommonly handsome young man and extremely reticent. He turned his inheritance over merely with the request that it be given away as quickly as possible, and to "unpopular" causes, without regard to race, creed, or color. In doing this, he made no gesture of any kind. He simply did not want the money, and refused to take it. He wished only to be left free to follow the life he had planned to live. It was a strange experience to look upon a man in the flesh and in his right mind who could act like that about a million dollars.

While the board of directors in charge of distributing grants from the Garland Fund exhibited great cooperation during its initial phase, gradually the fratricidal hostility which characterized American radical politics in the 1920s made its way into the board's discussions. The board seemed to split between a Communist left and Socialist right wings, with a small number of centrists tipping the balance.

After the successful establishment of the fund, Garland "took up a farmer's life."

=== Notable contributions by the fund ===
From an early date the Garland Fund's board of directors determined not to give money directly to political parties, instead targeting funds to groups or institutions engaged in original groundbreaking efforts on behalf of the working class or oppressed minority groups. Some of the institutions receiving significant financial injections included the Rand School of Social Science, Brookwood Labor College, the Furrier's Union, and the International Ladies' Garment Workers' Union.

At end of the 1920s, the Garland Fund earmarked a fund for the National Association for the Advancement of Colored People, to finance "a large-scale, wide-spread, dramatic campaign to give the Southern Negro his constitutional rights, his political and civil equality, and therewith a self-consciousness and self-respect which would inevitably tend to effect a revolution in the economic life of the country. . ." The lawyer Nathan Ross Margold was retained by the NAACP to lead the legal drive based on these. He produced the Margold Report, outlining a different strategy for a legal drive funded by the Garland Fund. Based on this strategy, he argued Nixon v. Condon in front of the Supreme Court and won, overturning a Texas state strategy to exclude blacks from voting in national primaries. The Texas Democratic party was quick to adjust, however, finding a new way to circumvent the law, demonstrating the weakness of Margold's strategy. After granting almost $20,000 of the $100,000 initially earmarked for the NAACP, the fund ended its support - the stock-market crash had demolished much of the fund's resources.

=== Termination of the fund ===
On June 18, 1941, the board of directors of the American Fund for Public Service announced that it had voted to terminate the fund, returning its "few remaining assets" to Charles Garland. Garland was assigned $24,626.18 in outstanding loans, as well as the organization's final cash balance of $1,619.13. Over the course of its 19-year existence, the Garland fund had contributed nearly $2 Million to almost 100 enterprises.

=== Beneficiaries and clients of the fund ===
- American Civil Liberties Union
- Brookwood Labor College
- Brotherhood of Sleeping Car Porters
- Commonwealth College
- Daily Worker
- Equity Printing Co.
- Furrier's Union
- Hamburg America Line
- Industrial Workers of the World
- Labor News Reel Service
- Manumit School
- Minneapolis Daily Star
- National Association for the Advancement of Colored People
- The New Masses
- New York Call Printing Co.
- Novy Mir
- Oklahoma Leader
- Polish People’s Publishing Company
- Rand School of Social Science
- Russian Reconstruction Farms
- Seattle Union Record
- Summer School for Women Workers
- United Mine Workers of America
- Urban League
- Vanguard Press
- Women's Trade Union League
