= Melissa Murray (academic) =

American law professor (born 1975)

- Murray in 2026
- Born: Melissa Erica Murray; August 30, 1975 (age 51); Brooklyn, New York, U.S.
- Education: University of Virginia (BA); Yale University (JD)
- Spouse: Joshua Hill (m. 2004)
- Website: Official website

Melissa Erica Murray (born August 30, 1975) is an academic and legal scholar who is the Frederick I. and Grace Stokes Professor of Law and the faculty director of the Birnbaum Women's Leadership Center at New York University School of Law, where she has been a member of the faculty since July 1, 2018. Murray was previously the interim dean of the UC Berkeley School of Law.

== Early life and education ==
Murray was born on August 30, 1975 in Brooklyn, New York, and raised in Florida. Both of her parents were Jamaican immigrants. Her mother worked as a nurse and her late father was a dentist. Murray attended Lincoln Park Academy High School in Fort Pierce, Florida, where she played violin in two youth orchestras, was a contestant on Jeopardy! Teen Tournament, and was a nationally ranked debater, earning national runner-up for student congress her senior year, graduating in 1993. Murray earned her Bachelor of Arts degree in history and American studies Phi Beta Kappa from the University of Virginia in 1997, where she was a Jefferson Scholar and an Echols Scholar, a Lawn Resident, a Madison House volunteer, a university guide service historian, member of the Washington Literary Society and Debating Union, co-chair of the College Bowl, fundraising chair of the Colonnade Ball Committee, and volunteer at the Learning Needs and Evaluation Center. Murray then earned her Juris Doctor from Yale Law School in 2002, where she was the notes development editor of the Yale Law Journal. She earned special recognition as an NAACP-LDF/Shearman & Sterling Scholar and was a semifinalist of Morris Tyler Moot Court.

== Career ==
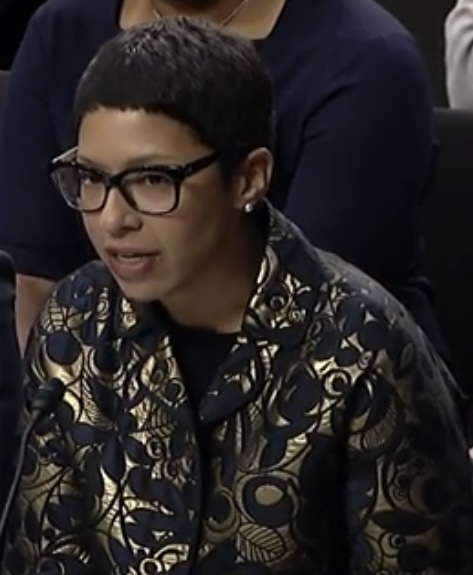
Murray testifying at the nomination hearing of Brett Kavanaugh to be an associate justice of the Supreme Court – September 7, 2018

Following law school, Murray clerked for Sonia Sotomayor (then on the Second Circuit) and Stefan R. Underhill of the United States District Court for the District of Connecticut. She was the only African-American clerk at the United States Court of Appeals for the Second Circuit.

Murray joined the faculty at UC Berkeley School of Law in 2006 and was granted tenure in 2011. As an assistant professor, she was the co-winner of the Association of American Law Schools 2012 Scholarly Papers Competition with Ashira Ostrow for her article "Marriage as Punishment." In her paper, Murray describes how "marriage has played a critical role in the operation of the criminal justice system, including serving as a defense to crime and as a form of punishment". The following year, her article "What's So New About the New Illegitimacy?" was awarded the Dukeminier Awards' Michael Cunningham Prize as one of the best sexual orientation and gender identity law review articles of 2012.

As a full professor at UC Berkeley, Murray was the recipient of the 2014 Rutter Award for Teaching Distinction which "honors a professor who has shown an outstanding commitment to teaching and who is an inspiration to students." The following year, she was appointed faculty director of the Center on Reproductive Rights and Justice (CRRJ), the United States' first law school think tank to focus on reproductive rights and justice issues. She also became the co-author of "Cases on Reproductive Rights and Justice," the first reproductive rights and justice casebook. On March 22, 2016, Murray was named interim dean of the UC Berkeley School of Law following the resignation of former dean Sujit Choudhry. On June 11, 2018, Murray left UC Berkeley to accept a position as a tenured faculty member at New York University and become the co-faculty director of the Birnbaum Women's Leadership Network.

On September 7, 2018, Murray testified at Brett Kavanaugh's Supreme Court confirmation hearing where she cautioned the United States Senate Committee on the Judiciary that he would overturn Roe v. Wade.

Murray has been a member of the American Law Institute and sat on the boards of directors for the Brennan Center for Justice, the American Constitution Society, the Guttmacher Institute, and the National Women's Law Center.

Murray was considered to be a contender for a federal judgeship under the Biden administration.

Since 2019, Murray has co-hosted the podcast Strict Scrutiny with fellow legal academics Kate Shaw and Leah Litman. In 2022, the podcast joined the Crooked Media network.

== Personal life ==
Murray married Joshua Hill Jr. on October 23, 2004.

== Selected publications ==
- Reproductive Rights and Justice Stories (Foundation Press, 2019) (with K. Shaw & R. Siegel).
- Cases on Reproductive Rights and Justice (Foundation Press, 2014)
- The Trump Indictments: The Historic Charging Documents with Commentary (W. W. Norton, 2024, ISBN 978-1-324-07920-0) (with A. Weissman)
- The U.S. Constitution: A Comprehensive and Annotated Guide for the Modern Reader. (Simon & Schuster, LLC, 2026).

== See also ==
- Joe Biden Supreme Court candidates
