= United States v. Hemani =

- Supreme Court of the United States

Argued March 2, 2026 Decided June 18, 2026
- Full case name: United States, Petitioner v. Ali Danial Hemani
- Docket no.: 24-1234
- Citations: 608 U.S. 72 (more)
- Argument: Oral argument
- Opinion announcement: Opinion announcement
- Decision: Opinion

Case history
- Prior: Indictment dismissed. United States v. Hemani (E.D. Tex. 2024).; Affirmed. (5th Cir. 2025).; Cert. granted. 607 U.S. ___ (2025).

Holding
- It is an unconstitutional violation of the Second Amendment to use the federal law banning unlawful users of controlled substances from possessing firearms to criminalize the possession of a gun by anyone who habitually uses such a substance.

Court membership
- Chief Justice John Roberts Associate Justices Clarence Thomas · Samuel Alito; Sonia Sotomayor · Elena Kagan; Neil Gorsuch · Brett Kavanaugh; Amy Coney Barrett · Ketanji Brown Jackson

Case opinions
- Majority: Gorsuch, joined by Roberts, Thomas, Sotomayor, Kavanaugh, Barrett, Jackson
- Concurrence: Thomas
- Concurrence: Jackson, joined by Sotomayor
- Concurrence: Alito (in judgment), joined by Kagan

Laws applied
- U.S. Const. amend. II

United States v. Hemani, 608 U.S. 772 (2026), was a United States Supreme Court case in which the court held that it is an unconstitutional violation of the Second Amendment to the United States Constitution to use the federal law banning unlawful users of controlled substances from possessing firearms to criminalize the possession of a gun by anyone who habitually uses such a substance without proof of active, simultaneous intoxication or dangerousness. The statute in question was 18 U.S.C. § 922(g)(3).

== Background ==
Ali Danial Hemani, a dual-citizen of the United States and Pakistan, had been under investigation by the Federal Bureau of Investigation (FBI). Federal authorities suspected Hemani of having ties to terrorist organizations. The FBI obtained a search warrant to search Hemani's home. Agents found a Glock 9mm handgun, 60 grams of marijuana, and 4.7 grams of cocaine. Hemani admitted to investigators that he was a user of both marijuana and cocaine.

Hemani was indicted in the Eastern District of Texas for violating 18 U.S.C. § 922(g)(3), which makes it illegal for anyone who is "an unlawful user of or addicted to any controlled substance" to possess a firearm. Hemani moved to dismiss the indictment on the ground that § 922(g)(3) violates the Second Amendment on its face. A magistrate judge recommended dismissing the indictment. Hemani later amended his motion to lodge an as-applied challenge to the constitutionality of the law. The district court granted the motion, and dismissed the indictment on February 1, 2024. Relying on its recently issued precedent, the Fifth Circuit affirmed on January 31, 2025.

== Decision ==
On June 2, 2025, the United States filed a petition for certiorari, seeking to reverse the judgment of the Fifth Circuit. On October 20, the Supreme Court granted review. The case was argued on March 2, 2026, and an opinion was issued on June 18, 2026.

== Impact ==
While the ruling strengthened gun rights for substance users, it did not apply to those who possess firearms while intoxicated or impact either federal firearms restrictions which disarm convicted felons or prosecutions which involve proof that a defendant's drug use renders them dangerous.
