= Mahmoud Khalil (disambiguation) =

Mahmoud Khalil (born 1995) is a Syria-born United States-based Palestinian student activist.

Mahmoud Khalil may also refer to:

- Mahmoud Khalil (handballer) (born 1991), Egyptian handball player
- Mahmoud Khalil (footballer) (born 1995), Iraqi footballer
- Mahmoud Khalil Al-Hussary (1917–1980), Egyptian Quran reciter

== See also ==
- Mohammad Khalil (disambiguation)
