= Elie Mystal =

American legal commentator and writer (born 1978)

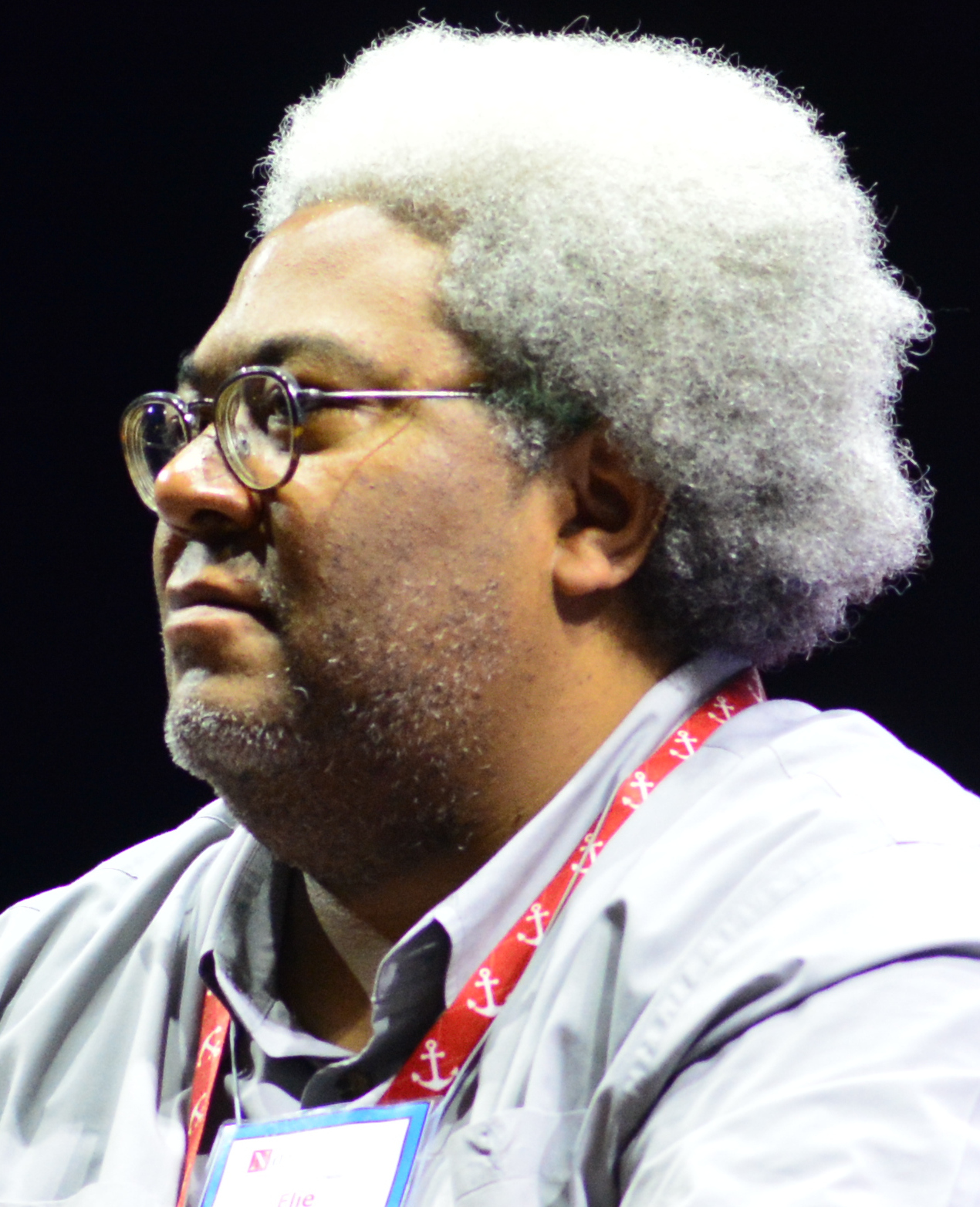
- Mystal in 2023
- Born: Elie Ying Mystal; May 10, 1978 (age 48)
- Education: Harvard University (BA, JD)
- Occupations: Writer; political commentator
- Employer: The Nation
- Known for: Commentary and criticism about the U.S. Constitution
- Spouse: Christine Nyereyegona
- Children: 2

Elie Ying Mystal (born May 10, 1978) is an American political commentator, writer and former law firm associate. He is the justice correspondent at The Nation, where he writes about the courts and the criminal justice system.

== Early life and education ==
Elie Mystal's father, also named Elie, was Haitian-American, the first black person elected to the Suffolk County Legislature, and an influential political operative whose career ended with a fine for violating election district residency laws. Mystal's middle name, Ying, comes from his maternal grandfather, who was Chinese.

Mystal graduated with a degree in Government from Harvard University in 2000, and earned his J.D. from Harvard Law School in 2003. He worked as an associate at Debevoise and Plimpton from 2003 to 2005. Mystal never completed his bar application because he "hated [his] job."

== Career ==
Mystal is the author of Allow Me to Retort: A Black Guy's Guide to the Constitution, which is intended to be an "easily digestible argument about what rights we have, what rights Republicans are trying to take away, and how to stop them." The book, which was published by The New Press in March 2022, made The New York Times Best Seller list that same month. In March 2025, he published his second book, Bad Law: Ten Popular Laws That Are Ruining America, through The New Press.

As of 2022, Mystal was a board member of Demand Justice, a liberal judicial advocacy group.

Since 2020, Mystal has been an Alfred Knobler Fellow at the Type Media Center.

== Publications ==
- Allow Me to Retort: A Black Guy's Guide to the Constitution. New York: The New Press. 2022. ISBN 9781620976814. OCLC 1252960938.
- Bad Law: Ten Popular Laws That Are Ruining America. New York: The New Press. 2025. ISBN 9781620978580.
