= Andrew Bracey =

English artist

Andrew Bracey (born 1978) is an English artist, currently based in Lincoln.

== Early life and education ==
Bracey was born in Bristol, England. He studied fine art at Liverpool John Moores University, and Manchester Metropolitan University.

== Career ==
Bracey has shown widely at galleries including Manchester Art Gallery; ICA, London; Pumphouse gallery, London; The Lowry, Salford; and Chapter Arts Centre, Cardiff. he has been shortlisted for the John Moore’s Painting Prize, Oriel Mostyn open and Emergency at aspex. He has had exhibitions at firstsite, Colchester; Transition Gallery, London; Porch Gallery, Manchester; The Usher Gallery, Lincoln. Andrew Bracey is a member of Suite Studio Group.

Bracey is a senior lecturer in Fine Art at The University of Lincoln, and has been a visiting lecturer at Liverpool John Moores, Huddersfield, Salford and Wolverhampton Universities.
