= Christopher Bracey =

American lawyer

Professor of Law and Executive Vice President and Provost Emeritus of the George Washington University
- Preceded by: M. Brian Blake

Personal details
- Born: Washington, D.C., U.S.
- Education: University of North Carolina at Chapel Hill (BA); Harvard University (JD)

Christopher Alan Bracey (born December 1970) is a Professor of Law and Provost and Executive Vice President Emeritus at The George Washington University. He served as provost and executive vice president for academic affairs of The George Washington University from 2022 until his resignation in 2025 after serving 14 years in various school level and university level academic leadership roles. He has also published several books on race, inequality, and the law and is the author of Saviors or Sellouts: The Promise and Peril of Black Conservatism from Booker T. Washington to Condoleezza Rice (2008) and co-editor of The Dred Scott Case: Historical and Contemporary Perspectives on Race and Law (2010).

== Early life and education ==
Bracey was born in Washington, D.C., but grew up in Columbia, Maryland. He graduated from Centennial High School in 1988. He then enrolled at the University of North Carolina at Chapel Hill, where he received his Bachelor of Science degree with highest honors in 1992, with majors in Criminal Justice and African American Studies. He went on to complete his J.D. degree at Harvard Law School in 1995, where he served as supervising editor on the Harvard Law Review.

== Legal career ==
After graduating from law school, Bracey served as law clerk to Judge Royce C. Lamberth of the United States District Court for the District of Columbia from 1995 to 1996. During this period, Judge Lamberth was serving as an appointed Judge to the Foreign Intelligence Surveillance Act (FISA) Court. Bracey served as Lamberth’s law clerk on the FISA Court as well.

Bracey practiced law with the firm Jenner & Block, where he litigated a variety of cases involving telecommunications, antitrust, criminal, constitutional, and common law issues. He is a member of the Maryland and District of Columbia Bars.

== Academic career ==
After leaving private practice in 1999, Bracey served as visiting assistant professor of law at Northwestern University School of Law. In 2001, he received the Northwestern Outstanding Faculty Award.

Bracey left Northwestern in summer 2001 to accept an appointment as associate professor of law at Washington University School of Law. He remained at Washington University in St. Louis until 2008, where he was enjoyed courtesy appointments in both the African & African American Studies and Urban Studies departments. While serving on the faculty, Bracey launched Bracey Consulting, LLC in 2003, a professional services company providing regulatory compliance and management solutions to business organizations.

In 2006, Bracey joined Blackprof.com, a blog of “race, culture, and society” written by many black academics and founded by fellow law professors Spencer Overton and Paul Butler. In 2007, Bracey became the lead administrator for the blog.

Bracey joined the George Washington University Law School as a tenured full professor of law in 2008. He teaches courses in constitutional law, race and racism in the law, and civil and criminal procedure. He also served as interim dean of the law school from June 2019 to August 2020.

Bracey's research addresses historical and contemporary race issues in the law. He has written and lectured widely on the history of American race relations, constitutional interpretation and adjudication, and civil rights. His scholarly writings have appeared in a number of leading law reviews, including Northwestern University Law Review, University of Southern California Law Review, Yale Law Journal (Pocket Part), University of Pennsylvania Journal of Constitutional Law, Journal of Law and Criminology, Alabama Law Review, and Stanford Journal of Civil Rights and Civil Liberties among others. In 2008, his first book, Saviors or Sellouts: The Promise and Peril of Black Conservatism from Booker T. Washington to Condoleezza Rice, was published by Beacon Press.

Bracey’s achievements have earned him several awards over the years, including, most recently, the 2013 Foundation Award for Faculty Excellence. In June 2011, Bracey was named Senior Associate dean for Academic Affairs at the George Washington University Law School. In September 2016, he was named Vice Provost for Faculty Affairs at the George Washington University. He also served as dean of the Law School during the 2019-20 academic year.

In June 2021, Bracey was named interim provost and executive vice president for academic affairs after his predecessor at GW, M. Brian Blake, left the university to become the president of Georgia State University. In February 2022, University President Mark S. Wrighton made Bracey's appointment permanent.

== Selected publications ==
- Bracey, Christopher A. (April 2003). "Thinking Race, Making Nation (reviewing Glenn C. Loury, The Anatomy of Racial Inequality)" Northwestern University Law Review, vol. 97, p. 911.
- Bracey, Christopher A. (September 2006). "The Cul De Sac of Race Preference Discourse". Southern California Law Review vol. 79, no. 6.
- Bracey, Christopher A. (2009). "The Color of Our Future: The Pitfalls and Possibilities of the Race Card in American Culture". Stanford Journal of Civil Rights and Civil Liberties vol. 5, no. 1.
- Bracey, Christopher A. (2003). "Adjudication, Antisubordination, and the Jazz Connection". Alabama Law Review vol. 54, p. 853.
- Bracey, Christopher A. (2005). "Dignity in Race Jurisprudence". University of Pennsylvania Journal of Constitutional Law vol. 7, no. 3.
- Bracey, Christopher A. (2006). "A Blog Supreme?" Yale Law Journal vol. 116.

== Personal life ==
Christopher Alan Bracey lives with his wife and their children in Chevy Chase, Maryland.
