= Charles Garland (philanthropist) =

American philanthropist

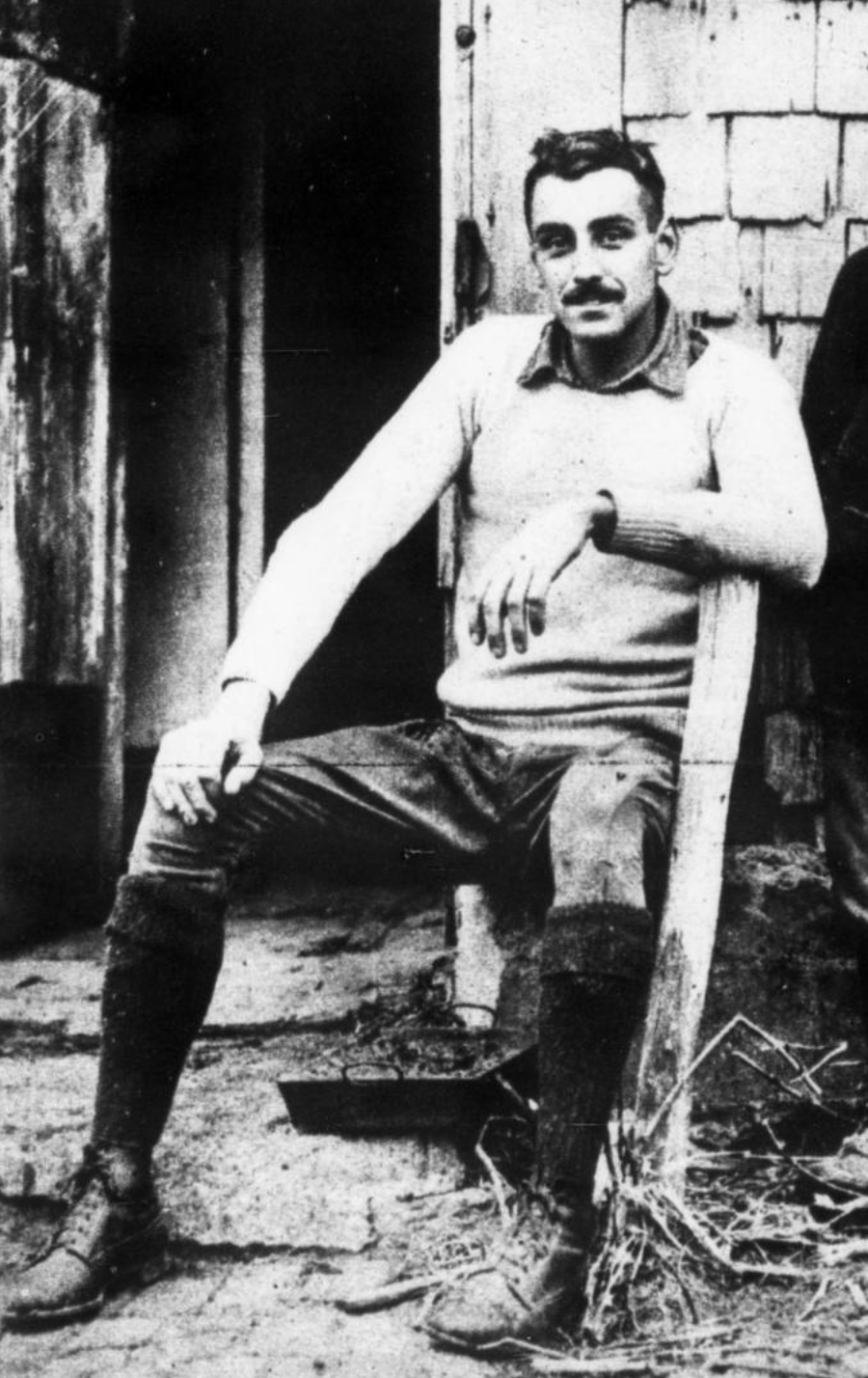
Garland in January 1922

Charles "Barley" Garland (June 26, 1899 – October 2, 1974) was an American philanthropist.

== Early life and education ==
Garland was born on June 26, 1899, in Hamilton, Massachusetts, the son of James Albert Garland Jr. and his wife Marie Louise (née Tudor). He was known since childhood by the nickname "Barley."

Garland had a privileged upbringing, and was educated at Eton College, St. Paul's School, and Harvard University. In 1919, he married Mary Mildred Wrenn.

Garland's grandfather James Albert Garland Sr., vice president of the First National Bank of New York and co-founder of the Northern Pacific Railroad, died in 1900. He left an immense fortune in bank stock, railroad stock, and real estate to his son (Charles's father) James Albert Garland Jr. James Albert Garland Jr. died of pneumonia in 1906. His will stated that his estate, which then valued at $10 million, should go to his wife until her death or remarriage, and thereafter to his sons, including Charles. Marie forfeited her right to the inheritance by remarrying in 1912, which left the estate in a trust fund, which was managed for the benefit of her sons until they became 21 years old.

== Career ==
Garland gained fame in November 1920 when it was announced that he had renounced his share of the inheritance, valued at one million dollars. He told newspapers that he had not earned the money, and that he did not believe in private property. He instead stated his intention to become an auto mechanic in order to provide for his wife and baby daughter. He later explained to a reporter that he would not accept money from "a system which starves thousands while hundreds are stuffed" and which "leaves a sick woman helpless and offers its services to a healthy man." Garland indicated to this reporter that he was not refusing to accept these funds because of socialist beliefs, but rather because as part of his study of the teachings of Jesus Christ and the works of Leo Tolstoy and H.G. Wells, he had come to the earnest belief that the money "is not mine."

Garland's wife Mary stated that she supported the decision, and that she would also refuse any inheritance from her own wealthy family. There were newspaper reports that Garland had refused another million-dollar inheritance from his uncle, but Garland later denied that this was the case.

=== Establishment of Garland Fund ===
Hearing of the young man's decision to refuse his inheritance and his rationale, the socialist author Upton Sinclair urged Garland to accept the money not for his personal gain, but rather to put it to a higher use. Sinclair suggested making $100,000 donations to a set of specific organizations seeking to change the economic and social system of which Garland disapproved. These organizations favored by Sinclair included The Liberator magazine, the socialist daily newspaper The New York Call, the communist daily newspaper The Daily Worker, the Federated Press news service, the Intercollegiate Socialist Society, the American Civil Liberties Union, the American Union Against Militarism, and the magazine edited by 1916 Socialist Party Presidential candidate Allan L. Benson, Reconstruction.

In 1921, Garland was approached by Roger Baldwin, head of the American Civil Liberties Union, probably through ACLU attorney Walter Nelles, a law partner of Swinburne Hale, who had recently married Garland's widowed mother. Baldwin convinced Garland to accept his father's inheritance and to establish with it a "national trust fund" which would aid efforts to expand "individual liberty and the power of voluntary associations."

On July 5, 1921, the American Fund for Public Service, colloquially known as the "Garland Fund", was formally incorporated by Lewis Gannett of the New York World, Robert Morss Lovett of the University of Chicago, and Roger Baldwin. The money behind the fund was held in the form of securities at the First National Bank of New York. In preparation for the task of distributing the funds, Roger Baldwin reached out to the Rockefeller, Carnegie, and Russell Sage foundations to determine how those philanthropies handled grant requests.

In January 1922, Garland announced that he had changed his mind, and would indeed accept the inheritance, in order to use it for his "own special purposes", which he declined to reveal. He soon clarified that he would give a third of the money to his wife (from whom he was now separated), keep only $500 for himself, and donate the remainder to "about ten persons" in whom he had faith. In July 1922, it was formally announced that Garland would use $800,000 of his inheritance to endow the fund.

The fund later made significant donations to the ACLU and the National Association for the Advancement of Colored People (NAACP).

According to the autobiography of James Weldon Johnson, who was one of the fund's directors:

[Garland] was an uncommonly handsome young man and extremely reticent. He turned his inheritance over merely with the request that it be given away as quickly as possible, and to "unpopular" causes, without regard to race, creed, or color. In doing this, he made no gesture of any kind. He simply did not want the money, and refused to take it. He wished only to be left free to follow the life he had planned to live. It was a strange experience to look upon a man in the flesh and in his right mind who could act like that about a million dollars.

Garland occasionally communicated with the directors of the Fund. For example, around 1931 he sent a letter criticizing the NAACP's actions in the Scottsboro Boys case as "anything but advanced or radical", and suggesting that International Labor Defense would be a more worthy recipient of the Fund's support.

=== Communes ===
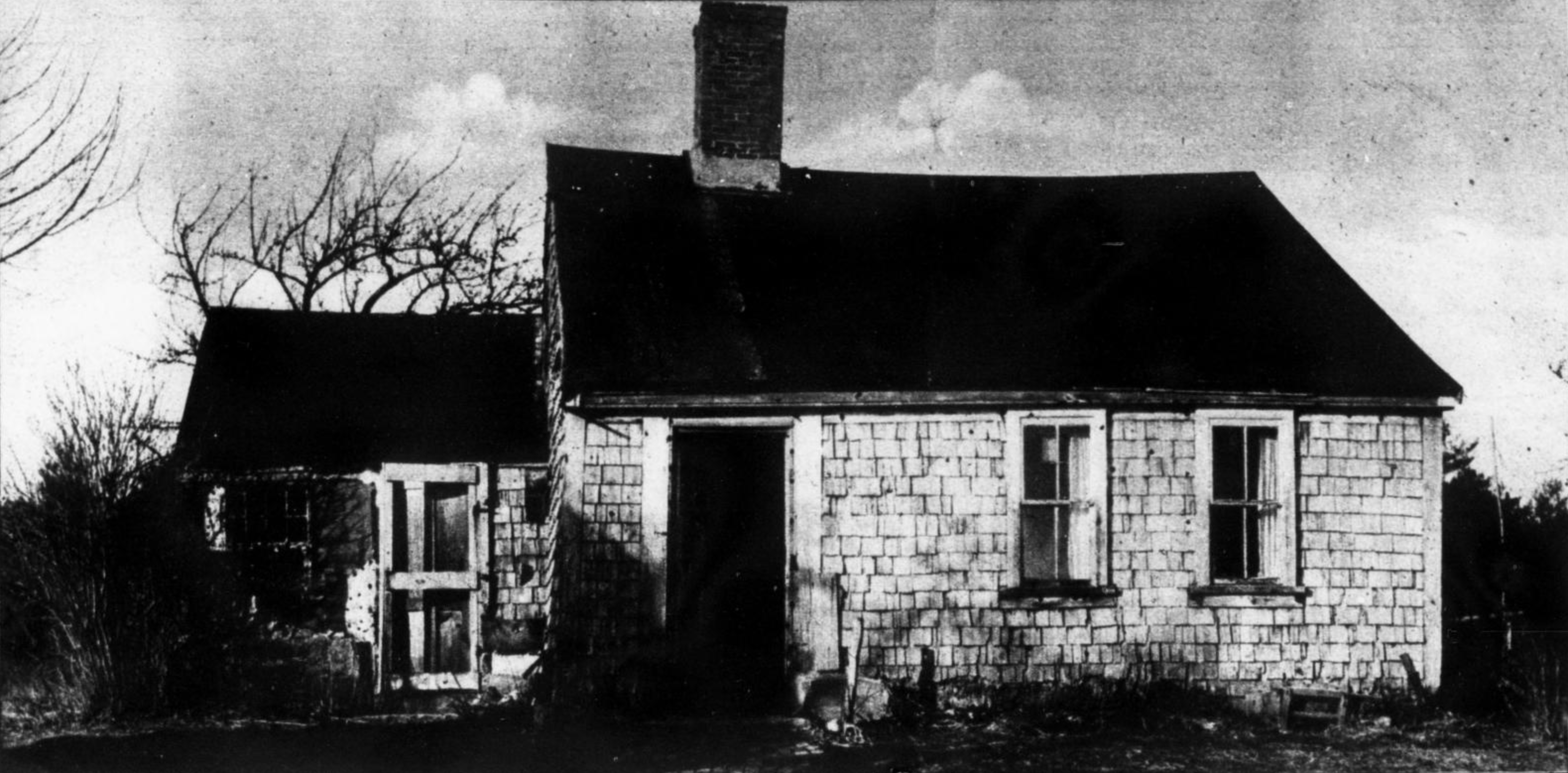
"April Farm", Mass. (1922)

After his separation from his wife, Garland established two successive agricultural communes, or "colonies of idealists", both named April Farm. The first April Farm, in which Garland lived from January 1922, was at North Carver, Massachusetts.

In 1924, Garland moved to a new "April Farm" in Lower Milford Township, Pennsylvania. Garland scandalized polite society by inviting young women to live with him at these colonies, where he planned to "work out the problems of life". Police confirmed to the newspapers that they would enforce state anti-adultery laws against Garland, who was still legally married to Mary.

Media regularly featured lurid stories about Garland's so-called "love farm". He fathered three children with Bettina Hovey, a member of the commune. One of these children, a girl named Barbetta, died in 1925 at the age of three months.

In January 1926, a charter for the commune was denied by Lehigh County court after an attorney objected that members "believe in and probably practice what is known as free love", an accusation denied by Garland. Garland was subsequently arrested for adultery on the basis of Barbetta's death certificate, in which he was named as a parent along with Hovey. He was fined $500 and jailed for 60 days. While imprisoned, he wrote two short stories which were published in the local press. His wife divorced him later that same year.

Garland left April Farm in 1930, donating it to Richard Holt, one of the colony's members. He lived out the rest of his life in obscurity. He married Ursula Feist, one of the colonists, with whom he already had a child. In 1932, it was reported that he was working at an automobile factory in the Soviet Union.

In 1940, Garland was reported in FBI files to be working for the U.S. Department of Agriculture. In 1941, the fund was dissolved. It returned a balance of $2,000 to Garland, who was living in Mount Vernon, New York, with his second wife Ursula and four children. In 1943, he was reportedly working as a machinist in New York City. He subsequently bought a farm in New Hampshire, around 1955. He died in New Ipswich in 1974. He was survived by his wife Ursula, five sons, and four daughters.

== Bibliography ==
- Samson, Gloria Garrett (1996). The American Fund for Public Service: Charles Garland and Radical Philanthropy, 1922-1941. Westport, Connecticut: Greenwood Press. ISBN 9780313298738.
