= String Quartets 1–3 =

String Quartets 1-3
- art by Paul Richards clockwise from top left: Balanescu, Musker, Hinnigan, Carney

Studio album by Michael Nyman and Balanescu Quartet
- Released: June 14, 1991
- Recorded: November 1990, Church Studios, Crouch End using B & W Loudspeakers
- Genre: Contemporary classical music, chamber music, string quartet, minimalist music
- Length: 63:17
- Label: Argo
- Producer: Andrew Cornall

Michael Nyman chronology
La Sept (1989)	String Quartets 1-3 (1991)	Prospero's Books (1991)

Balanescu Quartet chronology
String Quartets 1-3 (1991)	Byrne/Lurie/Moran/Torke (1992)

1991 Alternative Cover

2002 Decca Reissue

String Quartets 1–3 is a 1991 album by the Balanescu Quartet (Alexander Balanescu, Jonathan Carney, Kate Musker, and Tony Hinnigan) and the fifteenth release by Michael Nyman. It is the second album of his music (after Out of the Ruins) on which he did not perform or conduct, though he does provide liner notes. String Quartet No. 3 is built out of Out of the Ruins and became a fixture in numerous Nyman film scores in the 1990s.

The album was issued by Argo Records with two different covers. Decca Records reissued the album in the UK on July 8, 2002, as part of the British Music Collection, giving it yet a third cover.

Nyman's four string quartets are the subject of chapter 7 in Pwyll ap Siôn's The Music of Michael Nyman: Texts, Contexts, and Intertexts.

The album is the first of several recordings of the Nyman string quartets. The Lyric Quartet would also record String Quartets 2 and 3, and sections of String Quartet No. 4 on String Quartets 2, 3 & 4/If & Why (2002). The Nyman Quartet (Musker and Hinnigan with violinists Gabrielle Lester and Catherine Thompson), according to the liner notes of Acts of Beauty • Exit no Exit (2006), is set to record all four some time in the future.

The album was reissued by MN Records with a new cover and liner notes in November 2012. This edition is subtitled "Chamber Music Vol. II". It is not the aforementioned rerecording.

== String Quartet No. 1 ==
The String Quartet No. 1 (1985) was commissioned by the Arditti Quartet. Nyman had attended a performance of Ludwig van Beethoven's Grosse Fuge by the group, and found it the most theatrical performance on a string quartet he had ever witnessed, performed as though Beethoven had been trying to break through the limitations of the string quartet to create an orchestral sound. The quartet was originally intended to be a "compendium" of string quartet literature, but he decided that two pieces from different eras were enough of a contrast. It is built out of three distinct and diverse pre-existing music sources: John Bull's Walsingham Variations, Arnold Schoenberg's String Quartet No. 2, and Alex North's "Unchained Melody". The use of Bull is an homage to his professor, Thurston Dart, who presented Nyman with the Musica Britannica edition of Bull's keyboard works as a graduation gift. "Walsingham" was a popular song in Bull's time, and Nyman's use of "Unchained Melody" (originally written for a 1955 prison film titled Unchained and famously covered by the Righteous Brothers, and the favorite song of Nyman's wife, Aet) is a contemporary equivalent. As noted by Pwyll Ap Siôn, "Unchained Melody" is musically related to "Walsingham", as its opening three-note pattern of C-D-E is a slight variation of the melody of "Walsingham". "Unchained Melody" enters in figure H (measure 274) over a bass line of variation 9 of "Walsingham" that previously appeared in figure E.

Schoenberg's String Quartet No. 2 is notable in two ways: first, it broke with convention by adding a part for a soprano vocalist, and second, it broke away from the tonal language standard and paved the way for modernist music. Nyman incorporates the Schoenberg material beginning in figure B, and it does not return until figure I. The material Nyman uses is an eight-note (two-measure) phrase for the cello transcribed by Nyman for first violin. Siôn notes that Nyman compresses the nearly two-octave phrase into one octave. When it returns in figure I, Nyman has added tremolo, as well as syncopation more characteristic of his own style.

== String Quartet No. 2 ==
String Quartet No. 2 (1988) was commissioned for a dance work called Miniatures, choreographed and performed by Shobana Jeyasingh, who dictated the rhythmic structure of the piece, based on the South Indian Bharata Natyam tradition. Melodically and harmonically, it is Western classical music, while structurally it is Karnatak music. The Balanescu Quartet performed this work with the original dance as well as adding it to their concert repertoire. Miniatures was renamed Configurations when Jeyasingh added two additional dancers to the choreography.

Each of the six movements are in different rhythms: the first movement is 4-beat, the second 5-beat, the third 6-beat, the fourth 7-beat, and the fifth, 9-beat (2+3+2+2). The sixth and final movement is in multiple cycles of the preceding beat patterns.

== String Quartet No. 3 ==
String Quartet No. 3 (1990), commissioned by Alexander Balanescu, is based on Romanian folk music, along with material from his choral work Out of the Ruins, via a process Nyman describes as "translation." It affected much of Nyman's composition throughout the 1990s—riffs, in particular, a seven-note scalar ostinato, from it appear in À la folie, Carrington (in which it was used as a temp track and ultimately was transformed into a theme for Lytton Strachey), Practical Magic (not used in the finished film), The End of the Affair, and The Claim. The translation is not as simple as it may sound, as Pwyll ap Siôn notes, the first violin has new melodic material higher than the highest notes of the soprano melody, which is largely for the second violin. In addition, he elides caesuras and makes use of the stringed instruments' ability to sustain far longer than a human voice. Among the passages new to the string quartet are measures 17–24, 125–126, and a cello part beginning at measure 63.

Some cause of the variation is that the quartet is a celebration of the fall of Nicolae Ceauşescu, whereas Out of the Ruins is an expression of the hopelessness after an earthquake. Siôn describes numerous places where the accents and descriptors of the work indicate a very different feeling and approach to the music, with the quartet being much more aggravated, while the choral work reflects sorrow without indignation.

Like the first String Quartet, the piece is a reflection of Nyman's postgraduate work with Thurston Dart, who sent him to Romania in 1965 to gather folk music. The Romanian folk melodies that have been added to Out of the Ruins were all gathered on that trip.

== Track listing ==
String Quartet No. 2

1. I
2. II
3. III
4. IV
5. V
6. VI
  String Quartet No. 3
7. beginning
8. fig. D
  String Quartet No. 1
9. beginning
10. fig. B
11. C
12. D
13. E
14. F
15. G
16. H
17. I
18. J
19. K
20. L

== Personnel ==
- Michael Nyman, composer and liner notes
- Balanescu Quartet:
- Alexander Balanescu: violin I
- Jonathan Carney: violin II
- Kate Musker: viola
- Anthony Hinnigan: cello
- Producer: Andrew Cornall
- Engineer: John Dunkerley
- Tape editor: Simon Bertram
- Publisher: Kelly Music
- Series design: Joe Ewart at Assorted Images
- Art direction: Ann Bradbeer
- Cover art: Charcoal Drawings of the Balanescu Quartet by Paul Richards
