= Ravenous (soundtrack) =

- The very subtle difference between the US (top) and UK (bottom) editions' covers. Design by Deborah Norcross.

Soundtrack album by Damon Albarn and Michael Nyman
- Released: March 9, 1999 (United States); September 13, 1999 (UK)
- Genre: Minimalist
- Length: 74:35 (United States); 75:35 (UK)
- Language: English
- Label: Virgin (United States); EMI (UK)
- Producer: Damon Albarn and Michael Nyman; William Orbit (UK version tracks 20–22)

Michael Nyman chronology
Practical Magic (1998)	Ravenous (1999)	Wonderland (1999)

Damon Albarn chronology
Bustin' + Dronin' (1998)	Ravenous (1999)	13 (1999)

Professional ratings
Review scores
Source	Rating
AllMusic	4/5 stars
Music from the Movies	4/4 stars

Ravenous is the score for the film of the same name. It was written and performed by Damon Albarn and Michael Nyman (by agreement, Albarn credited first on the album and Nyman credited first on the film credits). The score was actually not a collaboration, according to Nyman: "Ravenous was a joint composition in the sense that Damon Albarn composed 60% of the tracks and I did the rest." It features Nyman's first writing for banjo since his 1981 self-titled album.

The tracks known to be composed/arranged by Nyman include:

- Hail Columbia & Noises Off (actually pre-existing arrangements) and Welcome To Fort Spencer. These were written for and performed by Foster's Social Orchestra, a group of non-musician artists Nyman assembled under the inspiration of the Portsmouth Sinfonia.
- Cannibal Fantasy (on the Ravenous DVD commentary, Albarn attributes Cannibal Fantasy to Nyman).
- Stranger At The Window (included in Michael Nyman's The Very Best of Michael Nyman: Film Music 1980–2001 and credited to The Michael Nyman Orchestra, along with Cannibal Fantasy).

In addition, the tracks most recognisably in Nyman's (more classical) idiom include:

- The "Ives" tracks (i.e. Ives Returns and A Game Of Two Shoulders).
- Trek To The Cave.
- Checkmate.
- Ives Torments Boyd And Kills Knox.

While the only tracks clearly known to be composed by Albarn are "Boyd's Journey" and "Colqhoun's Story" per the aforementioned DVD commentary, the following tracks share similar rhythmic and electronic characteristics, based upon looped samples and distortions:

- He Was Licking Me
- Let's Go Kill That Bastard
- The Pit
- Martha And The Horses
- Saveoursoulissa
- Manifest Destiny

The long track, "The Cave," features many characteristics of Albarn's other tracks while also sampling a sting from Nyman's rejected score to the film Practical Magic. The "End Titles" track features alternate recordings of "Boyd's Journey" (Albarn) and "Cannibal Fantasy" (Nyman).

Individual pieces from the score have shown up in two different movies:

- Opening sample of Saveoursoulissa in unaltered form in Magnolia
  - Actually, the Magnolia score features the beginning of the main title track from P.T. Anderson's Hard Eight (1996 - also titled Sydney) by Michael Penn.
- Manifest Destiny banjo riff in Hostel

== Track listing ==
1. "Hail Columbia" 2:42 (Philip Phile, arranged by Michael Nyman)
2. "Boyd's Journey" 3:02
3. "Welcome to Fort Spencer" 1:41 (Stephen Foster, arranged by Michael Nyman)
4. "Noises Off" 1:54 (Stephen Foster, arranged by Michael Nyman)
5. "Stranger at the Window" 1:48
6. "Colquhoun 's Story" 4:43
7. "Weendigo Myth" 1:23 written and sung by Quiltman
8. "Trek to the Cave" 4:24
9. "He Was Licking Me" 1:41
10. "The Cave" 8:01
11. "Run!" 2:10
12. "Let's Go Kill that Bastard" 3:51
13. "The Pit" 4:37
14. "Ives Returns" 0:49
15. "Cannibal Fantasy" 2:13
16. "A Game of Two Shoulders" 2:25
17. "Checkmate" 2:17
18. "Martha and the Horses" 3:14
19. "Ives Torments Boyd and Kills Knox" 2:16
20. "Manifest Destiny" 5:20
21. "Saveoursoulissa" 8:40
22. "End Titles" 5:01

== Personnel ==
The Michael Nyman Orchestra, led by Jackie Shave, conducted by Michael Nyman

- Ben Paley, violin
- Tab Hunter, guitar, jaw harp
- Matt Goorney, banjo
- Bing Lyle, squeeze box
- Tracks 3 & 4 performed by Foster's Social Orchestra
- Voices: Quiltman, Gail Turcotte; London Voices
- Orchestrations by Michael Nyman and Gary Carpenter
- Additional sequenced orchestrations by Damon Albarn
- Programming by Tom Girling and Robert Worby
- Engineered by Austin Ince and Tom Girling
- Mixed by Austin Ince, Tom Girling, and John Smith
- Assistant engineers: Nick Wollage and Matt Palmer
- Recorded at Air Lyndhurst, London and 13, London
- Produced by Damon Albarn and Michael Nyman
- Design: Deborah Norcross
- Photography: David Gamble
- Management for Damon Albarn: Chris Morrison/Niamh Byrne from CMO Management International Ltd
- Management for Michael Nyman: Elizabeth Lloyd for Michael Nyman Ltd. www.december.org/NYMAN
- Special thanks to Bunny Andrews, Fred Baron, Antonia Bird, Kim Bodner, Niamh Byrne, Geoff Bywater, Tom Cavanaugh, Terry Desling, Adam Fields, Ted Gagliano, Ellen Gisburg, Isobel Griffiths, Carla Hacken, David Heyman, Jill Konduros, Robert Kraft, Elizabeth Lloyd, Joy Maxwell Davies, Mary Jo Mennella, Cathy Merenda, Rebecca Morellato, Chris Morrison, Lisa Otto, Derek Power, Amy Sturman, Dana Tramountanas, James Ware, Lisa Bauman Wasiak, Jonathan Watkins, Laura Ziffren, Laura Ziskin
- Music supervised for 20th Century Fox by Matt Walker and Michael Knobloch.
- Executive in charge of soundtracks for Virgin Records: Cynthia Sexton

== British release ==
The British version of the soundtrack album features three tracks remixed by William Orbit, "Boyd's Beauty pt. A", "Screech Jam" (based on "The Cave" and "Ives Returns"), and "The Pit." Due to the length of the album, this necessitated the omission of three tracks: "Ives Returns," "Manifest Destiny," and "End Credits."

=== Track listing ===
1. Hail Columbia 2:42 (Philip Phile, arranged by Michael Nyman)
2. Boyd's Journey 3:02
3. Welcome to Fort Spencer 1:41 (Stephen Foster, arranged by Michael Nyman)
4. Noises Off 1:54 (Stephen Foster, arranged by Michael Nyman)
5. Stranger at the Window 1:48
6. Colquhoun's Story 4:43
7. Weendigo Myth 1:23 written and sung by Quiltman
8. Trek to the Cave 4:24
9. "He Was Licking Me" 1:41
10. The Cave 8:01
11. "Run!" 2:10
12. "Let's Go Kill that Bastard" 3:51
13. "The Pit" 4:37
14. Cannibal Fantasy 2:13
15. A Game of Two Shoulders 2:25
16. Checkmate 2:17
17. Martha and the Horses 3:14
18. Ives Torments Boyd and Kills Knox 2:16
19. Saveoursoulissa 8:38
20. Boyd's Beauty pt. A* 4:21
21. Screech Jam* 3:31
22. The Pit* 4:40

=== Additional personnel for EMI release ===
*Additional production and mix by William Orbit

- Recorded and mixed at Guerilla Studios
- Keyboards and tweaks by William Orbit and Damian Legassick
- Pro Tools programming and engineering by Sean Spuehler
- Head of soundtracks for EMI Records: Vivian Baber
