= The Composer's Cut Series Vol. III: The Piano =

- photograph by Michael Nyman design by Russell Mills and Michael Webster

Studio album adapted from The Piano by Michael Nyman
- Released: April 17, 2006 (UK); May 27, 2008 (United States)
- Recorded: April 2005, Abbey Road Studios; February 2005, Whitfield Studios (tracks 1 & 6); August 2005, Whitfield Studios (tracks 7 &10)
- Genre: Contemporary classical music, Minimalist music, Film score
- Length: 52:03
- Label: MN Records
- Director: Michael Nyman
- Producer: Michael Nyman; Declan Colgan (tracks 1 & 6)

Michael Nyman chronology
The Composer's Cut Series Vol. II: Nyman/Greenaway Revisited (2006)	The Composer's Cut Series Vol. III: The Piano (2006)	Six Celan Songs • The Ballad of Kastriot Rexhepi (2006)

The Composer's Cut Series Vol. III: The Piano is the third in a series of albums, all released on the same day, by Michael Nyman to feature concert versions of film scores, in this case, Jane Campion's The Piano, and his 53rd release overall. The collection is more streamlined and has fewer tracks than the soundtrack album, starting and ending with the popular "The Heart Asks Pleasure First."

== Track listing ==
1. The heart asks pleasure first
2. The heart asks pleasure second to love
3. To the edge of the earth
4. A wild and distant shore
5. The promise
6. Here to there
7. Big my secret
8. Silver-fingered fling
9. Lost and found
10. The embrace
11. The mood that passes through you
12. All imperfect things
13. The wounded
14. Dreams of a journey
15. The heart asks pleasure first/The promise

== Personnel ==
The Michael Nyman Band

- Michael Nyman, piano
- Gabrielle Lester, violin
- Catherine Thompson, violin
- Ian Humphries, violin
- Beverley Davison, violin
- Mia Cooper, violin
- Rebecca Hirsch, violin
- Lizzie Bull, violin
- Morvent Bruce, violin
- Kate Musker, viola
- Joseph Boyd, viola
- John Metcalfe, viola
- Tony Hinnigan, cello
- Robert Max, cello
- Justin Pearson, cello
- Martin Elliott, bass guitar
- David Roach, soprano and alto saxophone
- Simon Haram, soprano and alto saxophone
- Andrew Findon, baritone saxophone, flute, piccolo
- Nigel Barr, bass trombone
