= Out of the Ruins =

- photograph by Agnieszka Piotrowska design by Iain Macdonald

Soundtrack album by Michael Nyman
- Released: 1989
- Recorded: 2 October 1989, The Holy Echmiadzin Church, Armenia
- Genres: Contemporary classical music, choral music
- Length: 20:42
- Language: Armenian
- Label: Silva Screen Records
- Producers: David Cunningham, Michael Nyman

Michael Nyman chronology
The Cook, the Thief, His Wife & Her Lover (1989)	Out of the Ruins (1989)	La Sept (1989)

Out of the Ruins is a choral work by Michael Nyman for an eponymous BBC documentary by Agnieszka Piotrowska in commemorating the first anniversary of the 1988 Spitak earthquake in Armenia 7 December 1988, which aired on the BBC's 40 Minutes. The texts are from Grigor Narekatsi's Book of Lamentations. It was conducted by Khoren Mekanejian.

The album, Nyman's fourteenth, was the first release by Nyman on which he did not perform but did produce, was released by Silva Screen Records and all proceeds from the sale of the album were donated to Aid Armenia. The music became the basis of Nyman's String Quartet No. 3, which in turn became the basis of the score for Carrington. It also appeared in part in À la folie, in unreleased music from Practical Magic, and in The End of the Affair and The Claim.

== Personnel ==
- Performed by the Holy Echmiadzin Chorus
- Conducted by Khoren Mekanejian
- 40 Minutes Editor: Caroline Pick
- Location Sound Recordist: David Briscome (BBC TV)
- Post Production: PRT Studios, London
- Engineer: Michael J. Dutton
- Produced by David Cunningham and Michael Nyman
- Special thanks to Ian Amos and George Kurkjian, OBE
- Executive Producer for Silva Screen Records Ltd: Reynold Da Silva
- CD Release Supervision: David Stoner and James Fitzpatrick
- Photographs: Agnieszka Piotrowska
- Cover graphic design: Iain Macdonald
- CD layout: The One Hand Clapping Company
- Translation and transliteration of choral text: Mark Sarafyan
