= Concertos (album) =

- Photo by Josef Koudelka

Studio album by Michael Nyman
- Released: 13 October 1997 (UK); November 4, 1997 (United States)
- Genre: Contemporary classical, concerto
- Length: 70:42
- Label: EMI

Michael Nyman chronology
Enemy Zero (1996)	Concertos (1997)	Gattaca (1997)

Concertos is the 31st album by Michael Nyman, released in 1997. It contains three concerti commissioned from Nyman, the Mazda-sponsored Double Concerto for Saxophone and Cello, featuring John Harle and Julian Lloyd Webber, the Harpsichord Concerto for Elisabeth Chojnacka, and the Concerto for Trombone and Orchestra for Christian Lindberg.

== Background ==
The album was intended as the first in a series of Nyman recordings, as it reads "NYMAN EDITION No1: Concertos" on the EMI label, but Nyman's only other release on EMI (until The Actors in 2003), The Suit and the Photograph does not have such designation.

The album appeared just as completely clear jewel cases were being introduced, and the inside back cover is colored solid red, with the series designation in the left area that was previously hidden by the tray. The Suit and the Photograph, however, was packaged in a standard grey-black tray.

Nyman said of EMI, "I didn't excite them, and they didn't excite me."
