= Wonderland (soundtrack) =

- design by Dave McKean

Soundtrack album by Michael Nyman
- Released: 30 August 1999 (UK); 6 September 1999 (US)
- Recorded: 15–17 March 1999
- Studios: Whitfield Street Studios, London
- Genres: Soundtrack, Contemporary classical, minimalist music
- Length: 41:43
- Label: Virgin Venture
- Producer: Michael Nyman

Michael Nyman chronology
Ravenous (1999)	Wonderland (1999)	The Commissar Vanishes (1999)

Wonderland is the 38th album release by British composer Michael Nyman and the soundtrack to the 1999 film Wonderland. It is the first of many collaborations of Nyman with director Michael Winterbottom. For Winterbottom, Nyman would later perform excerpts of this score in 9 Songs, provide a score for The Claim, and arrangements and re-used tracks for A Cock and Bull Story. Nyman's daughter, Molly, has continued the family working relationship with Winterbottom, scoring The Road to Guantanamo with Harry Escott.

Nyman has said that the soundtrack to Wonderland is his favourite film score. The New York Times compared the score to that of Stewart Copeland for Rumble Fish and said that "the rhythms are like a clock ticking" and that it is "alternately plaintive and mournful". The Guardian characterized it as "sumptuous, romantic". Senses of Cinema said the music was "heart-wrenching, full of tragic qualities, yet also extremely light".

Professional ratings
Review scores
Source	Rating
Movie Music UK	link

== Track listing ==
1. molly
2. eddie
3. nadia
4. dan
5. debbie
6. bill
7. eileen
8. jack
9. darren
10. unnamed
11. franklyn

== Personnel ==
Michael Nyman Band

- Jackie Shave, Beverley Davison, Jonathan Rees, Katherine Shave, Sophie Landon, Fran Andrade, Miranda Fullylove, Jonathan Evan-Jones, violin
- William Hawkes, Andrew Parker, Kate Musker, viola
- Anthony Hinnigan, Sophie Harris, cello
- Paul Morgan, contrabass
- David Roach, soprano saxophone
- Simon Haram, soprano & alto saxophone
- Andrew Findon, tenor baritone saxophone, flute
- Martin Elliott, bass guitar
- David Lee, French horn
- Steve Sidwell, trumpet
- Nigel Barr, trombone
- Michael Nyman, piano, conducting
- produced by Michael Nyman
