= The Claim (2000 film) =

2000 film by Michael Winterbottom

- VHS cover
- Directed by: Michael Winterbottom
- Written by: Frank Cottrell Boyce
- Based on: The Mayor of Casterbridge by Thomas Hardy
- Produced by: Andrew Eaton
- Starring: Peter Mullan; Milla Jovovich; Wes Bentley; Nastassja Kinski; Sarah Polley
- Cinematography: Alwin H. Küchler
- Edited by: Trevor Waite
- Music by: Michael Nyman
- Production companies: United Artists; Arts Council of England; BBC Films; Le Studio Canal+ Alliance Atlantis; Grosvenor Park Productions; DB Entertainment; Revolution Films
- Distributed by: Pathé Distribution (United Kingdom and France); Alliance Atlantis Releasing (Canada)
- Release date: 29 December 2000
- Running time: 120 minutes
- Countries: United Kingdom; Canada
- Language: English
- Budget: $20 million
- Box office: $669,258

The Claim is a 2000 Western romance film directed by Michael Winterbottom and starring Peter Mullan, Wes Bentley, Sarah Polley, Nastassja Kinski and Milla Jovovich. The screenplay by Frank Cottrell Boyce is loosely based on the 1886 novel The Mayor of Casterbridge by Thomas Hardy. The original music score is composed by Michael Nyman. The film did poorly at the box office and received mixed reviews.

== Plot ==
Daniel Dillon is an Irish immigrant who settles in the high mountains of California during the Gold Rush of 1849. It is now 1867, and Dillon has a vault filled with gold and a town of his own, named Kingdom Come. Dillon owns nearly every business of consequence in the town; if someone digs for gold, rents a hotel room, opens a bank account, or commits a crime, they will have to deal with Dillon.

Donald Dalglish is a surveyor with the Central Pacific Railroad, which wants to put a train either through Kingdom Come, or somewhere in the vicinity. He is here to decide the route. Dillon is anxious to ensure that the railway line is routed through "his" town, as this will bring more business.

Among the travelers who arrive in town with Dalglish are two women, the beautiful but ailing Elena Burn and her lovely teenage daughter Hope. The presence of these women is deeply troubling for Dillon, for they are the keys to a dark secret Dillon has kept from the people of Kingdom Come for nearly twenty years. Dillon had come to these mountains with his Polish wife Elena and their months-old baby, Hope. On a cold and snowy night they happen upon a shack named Kingdom Come, owned by a disillusioned '49er named Burn. Like Hardy's Mayor of Casterbridge, Dillon sells Elena and Hope to the prospector in exchange for the small gold claim that would later flourish and make Dillon so wealthy. Burn has died, and Elena has come to find Dillon because Burn left her with nothing, she is dying, and she wants Dillon to give her $200 per year so that she can "do right by Hope".

Dillon tells Lucia that they have to end their relationship and gives her some gold bricks and the deeds to her home, the saloon/brothel, and the tobacco house. Lucia is heartbroken, wanting Dillon and not his money. Dillon tells Elena that he never married anyone else because he was always married to her. The two renew their marriage but their time together is short, filled with Dillon's efforts to find a cure for her illness and ending with her death.

Elena's death coincides with the decision to route the railway some distance from the town for easier passage and construction. Lucia moves the girls, the booze and the tobacco house to the valley, effectively moving the entire population of Kingdom Come to her new town of Lisboa, named for her father's home in Portugal, to be near the railroad. Following Elena's funeral, Hope tells Dillon that she is leaving to find Dalglish and start a life with him. Dillon takes her up to the original shack Kingdom Come, showing her a picture of their family when she was a baby, and revealing the deal made right on that spot between him and Burn. Hope leaves him and goes to the new Lisboa.

Dillon is thus faced with the loss of both Elena and Hope, and his town. He sets fire to all the buildings in Kingdom Come. The smoke attracts the people of Lisboa, who find Dillon's frozen body in the snow near his original shack. Lucia is devastated, crying over the frozen body as it is brought back to the ruins of Kingdom Come. While many of the 'former' townspeople rush to find Dillon's stockpile of gold in the burned out vault, Hope and Dalglish choose instead to follow Dillon's body as Lucia and others continue with it down the mountain.

== Cast ==
- Peter Mullan as Daniel Dillon
- Milla Jovovich as Lucia
- Wes Bentley as Donald Dalglish
- Nastassja Kinski as Elena Dillon/Burn
- Sarah Polley as Hope Dillon/Burn
- Julian Richings as Frank Bellanger
- Shirley Henderson as Annie
- Sean McGinley as Sweetley
- Tom McCamus as Burn
- Karolina Muller as Young Elena
- Barry Ward as Young Dillon
- Duncan Fraser as Crocker

== Production ==
=== Filming ===
Primary filming took place at the Fortress Mountain Resort in Kananaskis Country, Alberta, Canada. Near the end of the film, in a scene where the character of Dillon is standing in the street and throws an oil can onto a burning building, you can see the tower, cables and chairs of a modern ski lift in the background. The decision to have the film's dramatic burning of the entire town of Kingdom Come also served as a first step to fulfill the producer's commitment to return the site to its original natural condition.

Some secondary filming took place in Colorado at the Durango and Silverton Narrow Gauge Railroad. The town that Lucia creates in the valley below Kingdom Come is not to be confused with the real town of Lisbon, California (now the unincorporated community of Arden-Arcade), located on the route of the Sacramento Northern Railway which started operation in 1918.

=== Soundtrack ===
The Claim
- design and illustration by Dave McKean

Soundtrack album by Michael Nyman
- Released: January 23, 2001
- Recorded: September 2000, Whitfield Street Studios, London
- Genres: Soundtrack, Contemporary classical, minimalism
- Length: 50:51
- Label: Virgin

Michael Nyman chronology
The End of the Affair (1999)	The Claim (2000)	String Quartets 2, 3 & 4/ If & Why (2002)

Professional ratings
Review scores
Source	Rating
Allmusic	3/5 stars

The Claim is Michael Nyman's first (and, as of 2008, only) score for a Western, and his second collaboration with Michael Winterbottom. In it, in particular, in "The Shootout," Nyman pays homage to Ennio Morricone's Western scores. "The Shootout" also incorporates material from A Zed & Two Noughts and Prospero's Books in a layered manner with elements of the main themes of the score and a Morricone-style trumpet motif. The score includes the principal scalar riff that appears in numerous Nyman works, including Out of the Ruins, String Quartet No. 3, À la folie, Carrington, the rejected score from Practical Magic, and The End of the Affair. The Claim marks Michael Nyman's last use of this musical material (as of 2008).

Portions of the score appear as solo piano works on Nyman's 2005 album, The Piano Sings, which features Nyman's personal piano interpretations of music he had written for various films.

==== Track listing ====
1. The Exchange
2. The First Encounter
3. The Hut
4. The Explosion
5. The Recollection
6. The Fiery House
7. The Betrothal
8. The Firework Display
9. The Train
10. The Shootout
11. The Death Of Elena
12. The Explanation
13. The Burning
14. The Snowy Death
15. The Closing

==== Production details ====
- Artists: The Michael Nyman Orchestra
- Composed and conducted by Michael Nyman
- Orchestration: Gary Carpenter/Michael Nyman
- Programmer and music editor: Robert Worby
- Auricle Operator: Chris Cozens
- Engineer: Austin Ince
- Assistant Engineers: Simon Changer and Ryu Kawashima
- Recorded, mixed and edited at Whitfield Sterret Studios, London, September 2000
- Music published by Northlight Music Ltd. (BMI)
- Design/Illustration: Dave McKean at Hourglass

== Reception ==
On the review aggregator website Rotten Tomatoes, 62% of 85 critics' reviews are positive, with an average rating of 5.8/10. The website's consensus reads: "Though it sometimes feels cold and detached, The Claim is evocative, beautifully shot, and full of understated performances."

Robert Roten writing for Laramie Movie Reviews found the film to be watchable though very slow in narrative pace stating, "It reminded me of the scene in Aguirre, The Wrath of God [sic] where the boat is dragged through the jungle. If the story was as crisp as the snow, and the plot advanced faster than a glacier, this might have been a better film. I'm glad I didn't spend more than a dollar on this. It rates a C." Roger Ebert gave The Claim a strong review, praising the film for its direction and cinematography.
