= The Draughtsman's Contract =

- Theatrical re-release poster
- Directed by: Peter Greenaway
- Written by: Peter Greenaway
- Produced by: David Payne
- Starring: Anthony Higgins; Janet Suzman; Anne-Louise Lambert; Hugh Fraser
- Cinematography: Curtis Clark
- Edited by: John Wilson
- Music by: Michael Nyman
- Production companies: British Film Institute; Channel Four Television
- Distributed by: Artificial Eye
- Release date: 4 September 1982 (Italy)
- Running time: 104 minutes
- Country: United Kingdom
- Language: English
- Budget: £320,000–360,000
- Box office: £420,000

The Draughtsman's Contract is a 1982 British period drama film written and directed by Peter Greenaway – his first conventional feature film (following the feature-length mockumentary The Falls). Originally produced for Channel 4, the film is a form of murder mystery, set in rural Wiltshire, England in 1694 (during the joint reign of William III and Mary II). The period setting is reflected in Michael Nyman's score, which borrows widely from Henry Purcell, and in the extensive and elaborate costume designs (which, for effect, slightly exaggerate those of the period). The action was shot on location in the house and formal gardens of Groombridge Place. The film received the Grand Prix of the Belgian Film Critics Association.

== Plot ==
Mr Neville, a young and conceited artist, is contracted by Mrs Virginia Herbert to produce a series of twelve landscape drawings of her country house, its outbuildings and gardens, as a gift for her cold and neglectful husband, who is currently away on business.

Part of the contract is that Mrs Herbert agrees to comply with Mr Neville's sexual demands. Several sexual encounters between them follow, each indicating reluctance or distress on the part of Mrs Herbert, and sexual aggression or insensitivity on the part of Mr Neville. During his stay, Mr Neville becomes disliked by several of the estate's inhabitants and visitors, especially by Mrs Herbert's German son-in-law, Mr Talmann.

Eventually Mrs Herbert, wearied by Mr Neville's excessive sexual appetite, tries to terminate the contract before the drawings are completed. But Neville refuses and their encounters continue as before. Then Mrs Herbert's married but childless daughter, Mrs Talmann, frustrated by her husband's lack of interest in sex, blackmails Neville into a second contract, in which he agrees to comply with her sexual demands, rather than she with his. Mrs Talmann wishes to become pregnant, and knows this is unlikely to happen with her husband.

Mr Herbert does not return when expected, and his dead body is eventually discovered in the moat. Mr Neville completes his drawings and leaves, but returns to make an unlucky thirteenth drawing. During his visit, he is surprised when Mrs Herbert propositions him for sex, and they make love. Mrs Herbert also indicates that her daughter's plan to conceive a child by Mr Neville has been successful.

In the evening, while Mr Neville is apparently finishing the final sketch, he is approached by a masked man, obviously Mr Talmann in disguise, who is then joined by the estate manager and Mrs Herbert's former fiancé, Mr Noyes, her neighbour Mr Seymour, and the Poulenc twins, eccentric local landowners. The party accuses Mr Neville of the murder of Mr Herbert, for the drawings can be interpreted to suggest more than one illegal act and to implicate more than one person. They also accuse him of the sexual violation of Mrs Herbert, as evidenced by his sexual congress with her that afternoon. Neville realises, too late, that he has been entrapped by Mrs Herbert. Despite his protests, the group of men blind him and beat him to death, finally casting his body into the moat at the place where Mr Herbert's corpse was found.

== Cast ==
- Anthony Higgins as R. Neville
- Janet Suzman as Virginia Herbert
- Dave Hill as Mr Herbert
- Anne-Louise Lambert as Sarah Talmann
- Hugh Fraser as Mr Talmann
- Neil Cunningham as Thomas Noyes
- David Meyer as Poulenc brother
- Tony Meyer as Poulenc brother
- Nicholas Amer as Parkes
- Suzan Crowley as Mrs Pierpont
- Lynda La Plante as Mrs Clement
- Michael Feast as the Statue
- David Gant as Seymour
- Alastair Cumming as Philip
- Steve Ubels as Hoyten

== Themes ==
Although there is a murder mystery, its resolution is not explicit; it is implied that the mother (Mrs Herbert) and daughter (Mrs Talmann) planned the murder of Mr Herbert. Mrs Herbert and Mrs Talmann were aided by Mr Clarke, the gardener, and his assistant.

In order to keep the estate in their hands, they needed an heir. Because Mr Talmann was impotent, they used Mr Neville as a stud. Mr Herbert was murdered at the site where Mr Neville is murdered. (In the original treatment, Mr Herbert is murdered on his return on the 12th day and the site was vetoed as a painting site, because it was instead to be used as a murder site.)

== Background ==
The film was inspired when Greenaway, who trained as an artist before becoming a filmmaker, spent three weeks drawing a house near Hay-on-Wye while holidaying with his family. Much like Mr Neville in the final film, every day he would work on a particular view at a set time, to preserve the lighting effects while sketching from day to day. The hands shown drawing in the film are Greenaway's own, as are the completed drawings.

Having received funding from the British Film Institute's Production Board for his films The Falls and A Walk Through H: The Reincarnation of an Ornithologist, Greenaway originally requested a modest £60,000 to make the film, and planned to shoot on black-and-white 35mm film and print on to colour stock to “find a visual equivalent for the black and white world the film’s main character draws in black on white paper”. Peter Sainsbury, head of the Production Board, had encouraged Greenaway to develop a feature film and reflected that when he read the script “it was as though Greenaway had been waiting for the BFI to catch up with him, so accomplished was its narrative, its characters and its themes.” The film was the first co-production between the British Film Institute and the newly-established Channel 4, with both providing £150,000 of funding.

The original cut of the film was about three hours long. The opening scene was about 30 minutes long and showed each character talking, at least once, with every other character. Possibly to make the film easier to watch, Greenaway edited it to 103 minutes. The opening scene is now about 10 minutes long and no longer shows all the interactions among all of the characters. Some anomalies in the longer version film are deliberate anachronisms: the depiction of the use of a cordless phone in the 17th century and the inclusion on the walls of the house of paintings by Greenaway in emulation of Roy Lichtenstein which are partly visible in the released version of the film.

The released final version provides fewer explanations to the plot's numerous oddities and mysteries. The main murder mystery is never solved, though little doubt remains as to who did it. The reasons for the 'living statue' in the garden and why Mr Neville attached so many conditions to his contract were also more developed in the first version.

== Locations ==
Groombridge Place, near Tunbridge Wells in Kent, was the main shooting location.

== Music ==
The Draughtsman's Contract

Soundtrack album by Michael Nyman
- Released: 1982
- Genres: Contemporary classical music, Film scores; minimalism
- Length: 40:42
- Labels: Piano; DRG (Italy); Charisma/Caroline (CD)
- Producer: David Cunningham

Michael Nyman chronology
Michael Nyman (1981)	The Draughtsman's Contract (1982)	The Cold Room (1984)

Professional ratings
Review scores
Source	Rating
Allmusic	4/5 stars

Michael Nyman's score is derived from grounds by Henry Purcell overlaid with new melodies, while one of the recurring tracks, apparently excluded from the film's soundtrack, is at least partly derived from the second movement of Wolfgang Amadeus Mozart's Violin Sonata in E Minor, K. 304. The original plan was to use one ground for every two of the twelve drawings but Nyman states in the liner notes that this was unworkable. The ground for one of the most popular pieces, "An Eye for Optical Theory", is considered to be probably composed by William Croft, a contemporary of Purcell. The goal was to create a generalized memory of Purcell, rather than specific memories, so a piece as readily recognizable as "Dido's Lament" was not considered an acceptable source of a ground. Purcell is credited as a "music consultant".

The album was the fourth album release by Michael Nyman and the third to feature the Michael Nyman Band. "It's like harpsichord and a lot of strings, woodwind and a bit of brass," remarked Neil Hannon, frontman of The Divine Comedy. "Somehow they just manage to… rock. With a vengeance."

The following ground sources are taken from the chart in Pwyll ap Siôn's The Music of Michael Nyman: Text, Context and Intertext, reordered to match their sequence on the album.

=== Track listing ===
1. "Chasing Sheep Is Best Left to Shepherds"- 2:33 (King Arthur, Act III, Scene 2, Prelude (as Cupid descends))
2. "The Disposition of the Linen"- 4:47 ("She Loves and She Confesses Too" (Secular Song, Z.413))
3. "A Watery Death"- 3:31 ("Pavan in B flat," Z. 750; "Chaconne" from Suite No. 2 in G Minor)
4. "The Garden Is Becoming a Robe Room"- 6:05 ("Here the deities approve" from Welcome to all the Pleasures (Ode); E minor ground in Henry Playford's collection, Musick's Hand-Maid (Second Part))
5. "Queen of the Night"- 6:09 ("So when the glitt'ring Queen of the Night" from The Yorkshire Feast Song)
6. "An Eye for Optical Theory"- 5:09 (Ground in C minor (D221) [attributed to William Croft])
7. "Bravura in the Face of Grief"- 12:16 ("The Plaint" from The Fairy-Queen, Act V)

The first music heard in the film is, in fact, a bit of Purcell's song "Queen of the Night." "The Disposition of the Linen," in its Nyman formulation, is a waltz, a form that postdates Purcell by c. 150 years.

The album was issued on compact disc in 1989 by Virgin Records, marketed in the United States by Caroline Records under their Blue Plate imprint. Initially this was indicated with a sticker; it was later incorporated into the back cover design in a much smaller size.

The entire album has been rerecorded by the current lineup of the Michael Nyman Band. See The Composer's Cut Series Vol. I: The Draughtsman's Contract.

== Art references ==
The visual references for the film are paintings by Caravaggio, de La Tour, Rembrandt, Vermeer and other Baroque artists and this gives the film a "painterly quality". Greenaway also said: "I consider that 90% of my films one way or another refers to paintings. "Contract" quite openly refers to Caravaggio, Georges de La Tour and other French and Italian artists".

== Reception ==
The Draughtsman's Contract has a 97% approval rating on Rotten Tomatoes based on 31 reviews, with a weighted average of 8.3/10. The site's consensus reads: "Smart and utterly original, The Draughtsman's Contract is a period piece that marks the further maturation of a writer-director with a thrillingly unique vision". Roger Ebert, who gave the film a full four stars, wrote, "What we have here is a tantalizing puzzle, wrapped in eroticism and presented with the utmost elegance. [...] All of the characters speak in complete, elegant, literary sentences. All of the camera strategies are formal and mannered. The movie advances with the grace and precision of a well-behaved novel." In Slant, a mildly positive Jeremiah Kipp called it "a first, fledgling attempt at what he later perfected, but that modesty could be seen as a virtue, since there is indeed some form of narrative here instead of the nonlinear, compulsive list-making and categorization that drives some people crazy about his other films. [...] The story marches forward like a death march and is resolved with merciless efficiency." Danny Peary wrote that "Greenaway handles everything with such elegance that we are totally unprepared for the final act of cruelty. Ending is haunting; it makes you reassess all that went before – supposed victims are really heartless predators."

== Restoration ==
The film was originally shot on Super 16mm film then blown up to 35mm for cinema releases. In 2003 the BFI restored the film digitally and this restoration was released on DVD. Umbrella Entertainment released the digitally restored film on DVD in Australia, with special features including an introduction and commentary by Peter Greenaway, an interview with composer Michael Nyman, behind the scenes footage and on set interviews, deleted scenes, trailers and a featurette on the film's digital restoration. In 2022 the BFI released a 40th anniversary 4K remaster of the film.

== See also ==
- BFI Top 100 British films
