= Peter Sainsbury (British filmmaker) =

Peter Sainsbury was Head of Production at the British Film Institute in the 1970s. He worked with major British directors of the era, such as Derek Jarman, Chris Petit, and Peter Wollen. He is best known for commissioning Peter Greenaway's The Draughtsman's Contract (1982). Sainsbury spent his career promoting narrative art house films to the wider public, mainstreaming works that charted a path between avant garde experimentalism and conventional narrative form.

== Head of Production at the BFI, 1975-1985 ==
Peter Sainsbury replaced Barrie Gavin as the BFI's Head of Production in 1975.

=== Early reforms ===
Sainsbury's first priorities as BFI Head of Production were largely administrative ones, particularly relating to the process of film selection.

Within his first year, Sainsbury attempted to rationalise the BFI's film application selection process. In concrete terms, Sainsbury wanted the BFI board to publicly and explicitly define what criteria it used in selecting films for financing. He argued this would make the process fairer for applicants. The proposal met with resistance from the BFI Board of Governors, which believed it was politically motivated.

Eventually, the Board of Governors and Sainsbury reached a compromise in the form of a new Guidelines to Applicants publication that laid out some of the BFI's selection criteria.

=== Film commissioning as BFI Head of Production ===
During his earlier years as BFI Head of Production, Sainsbury focused on financing political documentary and avant-garde work.

Characteristic films were Peter Wollen's Riddles of the Sphinx (1977), Elizabeth Taylor-Mead's Before Hindsight (1977), Ed Bennett's Life Story of Baal (1978), and Anna Ambrose's Phoelix (1979). This programming was a departure from the early seventies, when the BFI had mostly financed low-budget arthouse features with largely linear narrative structures.

From the late 1970s onwards, however, Sainsbury returned to the BFI's earlier interest in cultivating a British narrative arthouse tradition which represented a middle ground between his early interest in avant garde experimentalism and mainstream cinema.

Peter Greenaway's The Draughtsman’s Contract (1982) is the most famous example of the BFI's renewed interest in narrative form.

Other examples were Chris Petit's Radio On, Menelik Shabazz Burning an Illusion (1981), Pat Murphy's Maeve, Edward Bennett's Ascendency (1983), and Sally Potter's The Gold Diggers.

According to James Park, Sainsbury's aim here was to “maximize the audience for films which are innovative in their use of the film medium”.

== Ties to alternative cinema ==
Throughout his career, Sainsbury worked with independent film-makers to create more commercially viable works. The aim was to make works that were experimental but would still be palatable to more mainstream segments of the arthouse cinema audience.

During his BFI tenure, Sainsbury also tried to strengthen institutional ties between the board and the world of independent filmmaking.

By the late seventies, he managed to get key figures from independent film onto the BFI board, including Roy Lockett from the Independent Film Association, Alan Fountain, and intellectuals such as John Ellis, Sylvia, Tony Rayns, and Geoffrey Nowell-Smith.

Sainsbury's inclination for independent film emerged early in his career. In 1970, before his role at the BFI, Sainsbury had founded an alternative distribution company called The Other Cinema with Nick Hart-Williams. He also founded and co-edited the first six issues of Afterimage, an influential journal on avant garde, political, and underground film, which was published between 1970 and 1987.

== Influence on British film ==
Sainsbury led the BFI at a time of growing experimentation among British filmmakers, particularly those keen to use the visual arts as a source for cinema.

Sainsbury played an important role in sustaining, institutionalising, and mainstreaming these experimental impulses due to his interest in formally innovative, political cinema.

The clearest example of this was Sainsbury's role as an important patron for then up-and-coming British filmmaker Peter Greenaway.

Sainsbury was involved in commissioning and funding Greenaway in The Draughtsman's Contract (1982), his first feature-length film, as well as A Zed & Two Noughts (1985).

With the Draughtsman Contract, Sainsbury is credited with moving director Greenaway from the avant garde fringe into the mainstream of British art cinema. Sainsbury later described how he instructed Greenaway to proceed with the film: "A few requirements were laid down. There should be a sequential narrative structure, and characters should speak to each other, rather than to cameras and microphones."

== Australia Film Commission work ==
Sainsbury joined the Australian Film Commission as general manager of Film Development after leaving the BFI.

At the AFC, Sainsbury pushed for reform in the number and kinds of films being selected for funding, particularly documentaries. He argued for greater selectivity in AFC documentary funding, arguing the organisation should support a 'limited number" of works that demonstrated "radical aesthetic achievement".

He left the AFC in 1991.
