= The Suit and the Photograph =

- August Sander, Bauernkapelle, Westerwald, c. 1913 (c) Die Photographische Sammlung/SK Stiftung Kultur - August Sander Archiv, Köln; DACS, London, 1998

Studio album by Michael Nyman
- Released: May 4, 1998 (UK); June 2, 1998 (United States)
- Recorded: November 17–20, 1995 (Galaxy Recording Studio, Mol, Belgium)
- Genre: Contemporary classical music, chamber music, minimalist music
- Length: 56:21
- Label: EMI Classics
- Producer: Michael Nyman; Michael J. Dutton

Michael Nyman chronology
Gattaca (1997)	The Suit and the Photograph (1998)	Strong on Oaks, Strong on the Causes of Oaks (1998)

The Suit and the Photograph is a 1998 album by Michael Nyman with the Michael Nyman Band, recorded in 1995. On this album, Nyman is the composer, conductor, and producer, and wrote the liner notes. The album contains two works, String Quartet No. 4 and 3 Quartets. The album is named for its cover photograph by August Sander, which Nyman had associated with the Michael Nyman Band since its inception in 1977. He cites a description of the photograph by John Berger, in an essay of the same title, describing that the suits deform the working class rural men just enough to "undermine physical dignity." Both of the pieces on the album originated in Japan. It is Nyman's second release on EMI and his 33rd in general, but is not designated part of a series, as EMI had done with Concertos. Said Nyman of EMI, "I didn't excite them, and they didn't excite me." Nyman's only further releases on EMI would be the UK edition of Ravenous, featuring remixes by William Orbit, and The Actors, both film scores.

== String Quartet No. 4 ==
The String Quartet No. 4 is based on Yamamoto Perpetuo, a solo violin work, and the basis of Strong on Oaks, Strong on the Causes of Oaks. The piece was written in 1994-5 for Camilli Quartet (headed by former Michael Nyman Band member Elisabeth Perry), who first performed it on April 21, 1995, and ultimately dedicated to the memory of Alan Bush, Nyman's composition teacher at the Royal Academy of Music after his death October 31 of that year. The main theme of the sixth movement became the basis for "Virgin on the Roof" in Nyman's score for Carrington, which in turn was based on the String Quartet No. 3 with which Christopher Hampton had created a temp track.

Pwyll ap Siôn notes that the viola and second violin follow a different meter from that of the first violin. Essentially, Yamamoto Perpetuo was the basis only of the first violin's part in the Quartet, while the newly composed material goes in completely new directions, even to not matching meter.

== 3 Quartets ==
3 Quartets was commissioned by the Arion-Edo Foundation of Japan. John Harle and Elisabeth Perry joined a group of Japanese musicians at the Globe Theatre, Tokyo for its first performance July 15, 1994, conducted by Michael Nyman.

It is a multi-section, multi-tempoed single-movement work for a string quartet, saxophone quartet, and brass quartet. This piece also worked its way into the Carrington film score—the opening fanfare became a leitmotif for Mark Gertler. The heart of the work is a soprano saxophone chorale, and the work closes with a brass chorale.

On the album, the Camilli Quartet joins the Michael Nyman Band for performance of the piece.

== Track listing ==
1. I 3:36
2. II 3:17
3. III 2:28
4. IV 6:19
5. V 3:03
6. VI 4:04
7. VII 4:07
8. VIII 2:24
9. IX 3:39
10. X 2:47
11. XI 3:10
12. XII 3:00
13. 3 Quartets 14:24

== Personnel ==
Camilli Quartet

- Elisabeth Perry, violin
- Rachel Browne, violin
- Prunella Pacey, viola
- Melissa Phelps, cello

Michael Nyman Band

- Elisabeth Perry, violin
- Rachel Browne, violin
- Prunella Pacey, viola
- Melissa Phelps, cello
- John Harle, soprano saxophone
- David Roach, soprano and alto saxophones
- Simon Haram, tenor saxophone
- Andrew Findon, baritone saxophone
- Nigel Gomm, trumpets 1 and 2
- David Lee, horn
- Andrew Fawbert, bass trombone
- conducted by Michael Nyman
- Producers: Michael Nyman & Michael J. Dutton
- Balance engineer: Michael J. Dutton
- Front cover: August Sander, Bauernkapelle, Westerwald, c. 1913 (c) Die Photographische Sammlung/SK Stiftung Kultur - August Sander Archiv, Köln; DACS, London, 1998
- Publisher: Chester Music Ltd/Michael Nyman Ltd
- Michael Nyman management by Susan Read
- Special thanks to Michael J. Dutton, Nigel Barr, Liz Perry, John Berger
