= Eric Deacon =

English actor and writer (born 1950)

- Born: Eric Cecil Deacon; 25 May 1950 (age 76); Oxford, England
- Occupations: Actor & writer
- Relatives: Brian Deacon (brother)

Eric Cecil Deacon (born 25 May 1950 in Oxford) is an English actor and writer perhaps best known for his role in the 1985 film A Zed & Two Noughts, directed by Peter Greenaway, in which he acted alongside his brother Brian.

He trained as an actor at the Webber Douglas Academy of Dramatic Art and in repertory theatre. His other film roles include The Sex Thief (1973), It Could Happen to You (1975), À nous les petites Anglaises (1976), and Yesterday's Hero (1979).

He has been very active on television with credits including: Z-Cars, Survivors, Secret Army, Minder, Doctor Who (in the serial Timelash), C.A.T.S. Eyes, Dempsey and Makepeace, The Bill, Prime Suspect, Lovejoy, Casualty, Doctors and London's Burning.

He is married to actress Laraine Humphreys.
