= Decay Music =

- design by Russell Mills and Michael Webster, 2004 CD release, with Nyman at 60 sticker

Studio album by Michael Nyman
- Released: 1976
- Genre: Experimental music
- Length: 49:53 (LP); 63:44 (extended CD)
- Label: Obscure
- Producer: Brian Eno

Michael Nyman chronology
N/A (1976)	Decay Music (1976)	'The Masterwork' Award Winning Fish-Knife (1979)

Decay Music is the 1976 debut album by Michael Nyman, released on Brian Eno's Obscure Records music label. The two works on the album, "1-100" (composed 1 December 1975) and "Bell Set No. 1" (1974) are both built around the musical concept of decay. Both of these experiment with percussive, long decay musical forms. "1-100" is played at half the speed it was recorded. It was written for Peter Greenaway's film of the same title but rejected because it was too long. It was inspired by Frederic Rzewski's Les Moutons de Panurge, which Nyman often played with the Scratch Orchestra.

The album was first issued on compact disc on March 29, 2004, by EMI/Virgin. The original full-speed recording of "1-100" is included as a bonus track.

== Track listing ==
All tracks composed by Michael Nyman

1. "1-100" (27:18)
2. "Bell Set No.1" (22:35)
3. "1-100 (Faster Decay)" (13:40) (CD-only)

== Personnel ==
- Michael Nyman - piano (tracks 1 and 3), percussion, (track 2)
- Nigel Shipway - percussion (track 2)
- Composed by Michael Nyman
- Produced by Brian Eno
- Published by Chester Music Ltd//Michael Nyman Ltd (1991)
- Art direction by Russell Mills
- Image melts by Michael Webster
- Layout and design by the redroom@emi
- Liner notes by Michael Nyman and Brian Eno (2004)
- Digital remaster produced in 2004
