= Michael Nyman for Yohji Yamamoto =

Studio album by Michael Nyman
- Released: December 13, 1993 (Japan)
- Recorded: 1993, Air Studios, London
- Genre: Chamber music, contemporary classical music
- Length: 44:03
- Label: Consipio Record
- Director: Nobuyuki Takahashi
- Producer: Yohji Yamamoto, Michael Nyman

Michael Nyman chronology
The Piano (1993)	Michael Nyman for Yohji Yamamoto (1993)	The Piano Concerto/MGV (1994)

Singles from Michael Nyman for Yohji Yamamoto
- 1. "Anohito no Waltz"

Michael Nyman for Yohji Yamamoto is volume 2 of Yohji Yamamoto's series of albums, The Show. The album features the solo violin work Yamamoto Perpetuo (a play on "moto perpetuo"), which Nyman has since adapted into the String Quartet No. 4 (originally appearing on the album, The Suit and the Photograph) and the orchestral work, Strong on Oaks, Strong on the Causes of Oaks. The violin is played by Alexander Balanescu, and Nyman can be heard on one track, "Song L," at the piano.

The theme of The Show was "Cinderella", and Yamamoto desired "Some European folk element" in the score. At the time, Nyman had access only to some Scottish folk songs he had gathered but not used for The Piano, so three tunes, all of which happen to be in A-minor Aeolian mode, were worked into the score.

Because the album was a limited release in Japan, and not released in other parts of the world, it is something of a collector's item for Nyman fans.

An associated single, "Anohito no Waltz" was also released. The title track appears only on the single, while "Song L" appears as its B-side.

== Track listing ==
1. M-1 song A 2'00"
2. M-2 song B 2'36"
3. M-3 song C 2'15"
4. M-4 song D 5'17"
5. M-5 song E 4'08"
6. M-6 song F 3'35"
7. M-7 song G 3'35"
8. M-8 song H 3'03"
9. M-9 song I 3'24"
10. M-10 song J 2'55"
11. M-11 song K 4'07"
12. M-12 song M 2'27"
13. M-13 song L 2'58"

== Personnel ==
- Music Composed and Produced by Michael Nyman
- Violin: Alexander Balanescu
- Piano: Michael Nyman
- Recording Engineer: Michael J. Dutton
- Recorded at Air Studios, London
- Mastered by Michael J. Dutton at TRANSFERMATION, London
- Production Supervision & Direction: Nobuyuki Takahashi
- Production Management: Atsuko Hamazaki
- Art Direction: Hisao Sugiura
- Design: Hisao Sugiura, Yasunobu Kawajiri (Studio Super Compass)
- London agent: Fumiya Sawa
- Composer's representative: Nigel Barr, Michael Nyman Ltd.
- General Producer: Yohji Yamamoto
- Special thanks to Yohji Yamamoto Inc., Studio Super Compass, Super Muzak
