= Michael Nyman (1981 album) =

- Photo by Marcia Resnick

Studio album by Michael Nyman
- Released: November 21, 1981 on Victor Records VIP6798 (Japan); 1982 (UK)
- Recorded: 1981
- Genre: Contemporary classical music, minimalism, film score
- Length: 42:05
- Label: Piano Records
- Producer: David Cunningham

Michael Nyman chronology
"The Masterwork" Award Winning Fish-Knife (1979)	Michael Nyman (1981)	The Draughtsman's Contract (1982)

Singles from Michael Nyman
- 1. "Mozart/Webern" Released: 1982

Professional ratings
Review scores
Source	Rating
Allmusic	4.5/5 stars

Michael Nyman is the third album release by Michael Nyman and the second with the Michael Nyman Band, having previously contributed tracks to new music compilations. Most of the music was material from early films by Peter Greenaway such as "Bird List Song" from The Falls, sung by Lucie Skeaping, and music from Act of God and Tree.

It also includes his first concert work for the band, "In Re Don Giovanni", which is built around a brief 15-bar phrase in the accompaniment of Leporello's catalog aria in Wolfgang Amadeus Mozart's Don Giovanni, which was also released as a single under the title Mozart. Nyman says he discovered the piece playing the aria on his piano in the style of Jerry Lee Lewis, which "dictated the dynamic, articulation and texture of everything I've subsequently done."

The album should not be confused with Criterion's 1995 promo CD (CRIT CD002), Michael Nyman, which featured previously released material, none of which was from this album, which was released as Piano Records Sheet 005, and which has yet to be issued on CD. It was announced for release in 2009, in connection with Nyman's 65th birthday. This was missed, and it has been announced again for release on November 21, 2011. The CD was released in January 2012, including both the UK and Japanese cover art but not including the "Last But One Of The Last But One" non-LP b-side from the "In Re Don Giovanni" single.

It was published by Chester Music/Michael Nyman Ltd, and produced by David Cunningham.

== Band members ==
- Rory Allam - clarinet
- Alexander Balanescu - violin
- Anne Barnard - french horn
- Ben Grove - guitar, bass guitar
- John Harle - saxophone
- Nick Hayley - rebec, violin
- Ian Mitchell - clarinet
- Michael Nyman - piano
- Elisabeth Perry - violin
- Steve Saunders - trombone
- Roderick Skeaping - rebec, violin
- Keith Thompson - flute, piccolo, recorder, saxophone
- Doug Wootton - banjo

== Guest musicians ==
- Peter Brötzmann - bass clarinet, tenor saxophone
- Evan Parker - soprano saxophone
- Lucie Skeaping - soprano

== Track listing ==
1. "Bird Anthem" (from Act of God) 2:37
2. "Initial Treat" (from Tree) 2:50
3. "Secondary Treat" (from Tree) 1:27
4. "In Re Don Giovanni" 2:48
5. "Waltz in F" 5:55
6. "Bird List Song" (from The Falls) 4:19
7. "M-Work" 21:09

"Waltz in F" was reissued on the compilation, Century XXI UK: N-Z It is the only track to be issued on CD in its album performance. The main waltz theme, without the jazz improvisations, was the basis of "Waltzing the Bird" on À la folie. "In Re Don Giovanni" and the instrumental "Bird List" appeared on Live in new, live versions. A new recording of In Re appears on the 2008 album Mozart 252. "Initial Treat", the opening titles from Tree, is part of Five Orchestral Pieces for Opus Tree, which can be heard in its complete form by Jon Gibson and other artists at The Kitchen on the 1979 edition of From the Kitchen Archives.

The single Mozart/Webern was released on Les Disques du Crépuscule. On that single, "Mozart" is "In Re Don Giovanni"; "Webern" is "Secondary Treat". A third track, "Untitled", is "Initial Treat".
