= And Do They Do/Zoo Caprices =

- art by David Buckland; 1989 Ter Records CD release Jay Edition is identical save for the logo

Studio album by Michael Nyman
- Released: 1986
- Recorded: 1986
- Genre: Contemporary classical music, minimalist music
- Length: 48:22
- Label: Ter (1986, 1989); Jay (1999)(producer of the original recording)
- Producer: David Cunningham

Michael Nyman chronology
A Zed & Two Noughts (1985)	And Do They Do/Zoo Caprices (1986)	The Man Who Mistook His Wife for a Hat (1988)

And Do They Do/Zoo Caprices is the eighth album released by Michael Nyman and the fifth featuring the Michael Nyman Band. And Do They Do is a modern dance work commission by Siobhan Davies and The London Contemporary Dance Theatre, which premiered at Sadler's Wells Theatre on 25 November 1986. Zoo Caprices is a multi-stop violin solo for Alexander Balanescu based on the score for Peter Greenaway's film, A Zed & Two Noughts.

The album was issued on LP in 1986 by Ter Records under license from Jay Records. It was issued on compact disc first in 1989 by Ter Records, which had released A Zed & Two Noughts. Jay Records then reissued the album on CD on 15 June 1999.

== And Do They Do ==
And Do They Do consists of four linked "Songs" (although none of them are actually sung), that were used for Siobhan Davies's dance production, which the album photos suggest was done entirely in the nude. (The back cover of the booklet shows male full frontal nudity.) However, production photos and a video recording of the first performance in 1987 show that the dancers were fully clothed. The album cover art appears to have been taken from the stage design artwork for the play. The third song, although it has the jazziest qualities, is based on Robert Schumann's Nachtlied Opus 19, No.1, a "spin-off" from his opera, The Man Who Mistook His Wife for a Hat, which was written concurrently and in which Schumann's music is an important element of the story.

== Zoo Caprices ==
Zoo Caprices was written for the virtuosity of Alexander Balanescu, who premiered the work in Paris on 8 April 1986. The score is a reduction of the score for A Zed & Two Noughts, but allows for Balanescu's ability to create multiple harmonies on a single instrument through multiple stops. The order is significantly altered from the original album, and "Vermeer's Wife" and "Prawn Watching" are combined into a single section.

== Track listing ==
1. Song I
2. Song II
3. Song III
4. Song IV
5. The Lady in the Red Hat
6. Swan Rot
7. Up for Crabs
8. Car Crash
9. Bisocosis Populi
10. Venus de Milo
11. Angelfish Decay
12. Vermeer's Wife Watches Prawns
13. Timelapse

== Personnel ==
Performed by the Michael Nyman Band

- Alexander Balanescu, violin
- Rupert Bawden, viola
- Andrew Findon, piccolo, bass flute
- David Fuest, clarinet, bass clarinet
- Michael Nyman, piano
- Elisabeth Perry, violin
- Ruth Phillips, cello
- David Roach, alto, tenor saxophone
- And Do They Do recorded at Abbey Road Studios, London
  - Engineer: John Kurlander
- Zoo Caprices recorded at The Michael Nyman Studio
- Produced by David Cunningham
- Post production: Nova Studios
- Digital editing at Finesplice Studios
- Editing engineer: Ben Turner
- Mastered by Tim Young at CBS Studios
- Photography and cover design by David Buckland
- Album release co-ordination: David Stoner
- Executive Producer: Gordon Yap
