= Sangam: Michael Nyman Meets Indian Masters =

Studio album by Michael Nyman, U. Shrinivas, Rajan and Sajan Misra
- Released: 17 February 2003
- Genre: Contemporary classical music, world music
- Label: Warner Music

Michael Nyman chronology
24 Heures de la vie d'une femme (2003)	Sangam: Michael Nyman Meets Indian Masters (2003)	The Actors (2003)

Professional ratings
Review scores
Source	Rating
AllMusic	3/5 stars
BBC	(unfavorable)

Sangam: Michael Nyman Meets Indian Masters is the 46th album by Michael Nyman. It is a collaboration (both composition and performance-wise) with musicians from India including U. Shrinivas and the Misra Brothers. It was released in 2003 and quickly cut out by its U.S. distributor. It was the last non-soundtrack Michael Nyman album (and next to last album) to be released on any but his own label, MN Records, founded shortly thereafter. MN Records reissued the album in 2012.

== Musicians ==
- U. Shrinivas, mandolin
- Rajan Misra, voice
- Sajan Misra, voice
- Ritesh Misra, voice
- Rajnish Misra, voice
- Sanju Sahai, tabla

Michael Nyman Band:

- Gabrielle Lester, violin
- Catherine Thompson, violin
- Edward Coxon, violin
- Catherine Musker, viola
- Richard Cookson, viola
- Anthony Hinnigan, cello
- Nicholas Cooper, cello
- Mary Scully, double bass
- Martin Elliott, bass guitar
- David Roach, soprano, alto sax
- Simon Haram, soprano, alto sax
- Andrew Findon, baritone sax, flute, piccolo
- Steven Sidwell, trumpet
- David Lee, french horn
- Nigel Barr, trombone
- Michael Nyman, piano
