= Time Will Pronounce =

Time Will Pronounce The 1992 Commissions
- photo by John Bellars

Studio album by Michael Nyman
- Released: June 1, 1993 (UK); September 14, 1993 (United States)
- Recorded: June 12, October 19, and November 19 & 21, 1992
- Studio: St. Augustine's Church, Abbey Road, and St Michael's Church (London)
- Genre: Contemporary classical music, chamber music, minimalist music, art song
- Length: 64:21
- Language: English
- Label: Argo
- Producer: Michael Nyman, Michael J. Dutton

Michael Nyman chronology
The Essential Michael Nyman Band (1992)	Time Will Pronounce; The 1992 Commissions (1993)	The Piano (1993)

Professional ratings
Review scores
Source	Rating
Allmusic	4.5/5 stars

Time Will Pronounce: The 1992 Commissions is a 1993 album by Michael Nyman, his eighteenth release. Nyman does not perform on the album, but he composed all the music, produced it, and wrote the liner notes. The album contains four compositions. The album is dedicated to the memory of Tony Simons, "friend, manager, and generous and courageous survivor." The album is named for the second and longest of the four works, the only one featuring a former member of the Michael Nyman Band, Elisabeth Perry.

== Self-laudatory hymn of Inanna and her omnipotence ==
13:55

James Bowman, countertenor

Fretwork

- William Hunt, bass viol
- Richard Campbell, treble viol
- Julia Hodgson, tenor viol
- Wendy Gillespie, treble viol
- Richard Boothby, bass viol
- Assistant engineers: Alex Marcou & David Forty

Inanna is the Queen of the Heavens in the Sumerian religion. Nyman found the text on February 12, 1992, in a translation by Samuel Noah Kramer in Ancient Near Eastern Texts Relating to the Old Testament edited by James B. Pritchard (3rd edition with supplement, Princeton University Press, 1969), in the personal library of an Armenian friend. In the hymn, Inanna speaks proudly of all that her father, Enlil, has given her, and it takes the form of a list. Its audacity, shamelessness, and repetitive structure appealed to him, and thought it would be suitable for James Bowman's voice. He became even more interested in setting the work when he learned that Inanna is well-known deity embraced by many feminists, and not obscure, as he had initially thought. Indeed, she superseded all Sumerian deities, male or female, by the end of the Sumerian civilization. In spite of the last stanza of the piece being the most repetitive, Nyman chose to use cadential diversity rather than repetition.

The work was first performed June 11, 1992, at Christ Church, Spitalfields in London. The recording was made the following day at St. Augustine's Church.

== Time will pronounce ==
20:35

Trio of London

- Elisabeth Perry, violin
- Melissa Phelps, cello
- Julian Jacobson, piano
- Assistant engineer: Chris Ludwinski

The title of Time will pronounce is derived from the closing lines of Joseph Brodsky's "Bosnia Tune." Nyman uses the word "generally" five times in describing the nature of the work—violin and cello independent of piano, alternating tempi without motivation, use of harmonics, and so on. The piece premiered July 14 at the Pittville Pump Room, Cheltenham.

== The convertibility of lute strings ==
15:06

Virginia Black, harpsichord

- Engineered by Tony Falkner

Commissioned by neurologist Anthony Roberts for Virginia Black, a fellow student with whom Nyman studied harpsichord at the Royal Academy of Music, the title refers to a late sixteenth century practice to which Christopher Marlowe refers in his book, The Reckoning on the death of Christopher Marlowe, in which lute strings were popular to use as a commodity with moneylenders when money was not available, but Nyman states that this is completely irrelevant to the piece, and that his only musical reference in it is to the closing section of his own opera, The Man Who Mistook His Wife for a Hat, because the piece was commissioned by a neurologist.

This work was first performed November 19 at the Purcell Room in London, and was recorded at St Michael's Church in Highgate two days later.

== For John Cage ==
14:23

London Brass

- Mark Bennett, trumpet
- Tony Cross, trumpet
- Anne McAneney, trumpet, flugelhorn
- Chris Pigram, trumpet, flugelhorn
- Richard Bissill, horn
- Lindsay Schilling, trombone
- Richard Edwards, trombone
- David Purser, trombone, euphonium
- David Stewart, bass trombone
- Oren Marshall, tuba
- Assistant engineer: Tristan Powers

Mark Bennett was a guest performer on The Kiss and Other Movements. The piece is named because the work was completed on August 12, 1992, and Nyman read in the newspaper the following day that John Cage had died, although Cage's influence is not directly felt in the piece, and Nyman acknowledges the piece might not be to his taste. On earlier sheets of the work, he noted the deaths of Miles Davis (who died September 29, the day it was begun) and Ástor Piazzolla. The working title for the piece has been "Canons, chorales and waltzes," but Nyman rejected this because there was only one canon, one waltz, and no chorales. The work features a non-simultaneous multiplicity of the group operating more like ensembles that constantly change.

This piece was first performed November 16 at Norton Knatchbull School in Ashford, Kent, and was recorded five days later at Abbey Road Studios.

== Album credits ==
- Produced by Michael Nyman and Michael J. Dutton
- Engineered by Michael J. Dutton (1, 2, and 4)
- Tape editors: Michael Nyman & Michael J. Dutton
- Mixed and edited at Kitsch Studios, Brussels
- Assistant engineers/mixing/editing (Brussels): Bruno Stevens, Denis Wauthy, Sebastian Lambrechts
- Final editing and mastering on the Sonic Solutions Mastering System at Abbey Road Studios by Peter Mew
- P & Q encoding by Peter R. Vince at Abbey Road Studios
- Publishers: Chester Music Ltd./Kelly Music Ltd.
- Art direction: David Smart
- Photographic art direction and design: Joe Ewart for Society
- Cover photo: John Bellars
- Artist representative: Nigel Barr
