= The Commissar Vanishes =

1997 book by David King

The Commissar Vanishes The Falsification of Photographs and Art in Stalin's Russia
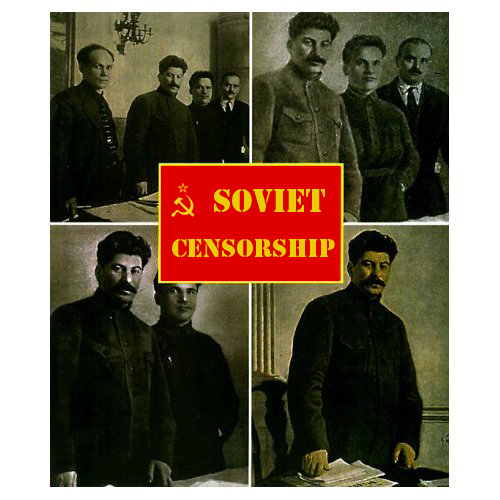
- Author: David King
- Language: English
- Subject: Art, history, politics
- Publisher: Canongate Books Ltd (United Kingdom); Metropolitan Books/Henry Holt (United States)
- Publication date: October 1997
- Publication place: United Kingdom
- Pages: 192
- ISBN: 978-0-86241-724-6
- OCLC: 59592918

The Commissar Vanishes: The Falsification of Photographs and Art in Stalin's Russia is a 1997 book by David King about the censoring of photographs and fraudulent creation of "photographs" in Joseph Stalin's Soviet Union through silent alteration via airbrushing and other techniques. It has an introduction by Stephen F. Cohen.

== Album ==
Music for David King's Book The Commissar Vanishes The Fall of Icarus

Studio album by Michael Nyman
- Released: 8 November 1999 (United Kingdom); November 18, 1999 (United States)
- Genres: Contemporary classical, minimalism
- Labels: Virgin Venture, EMI

Michael Nyman chronology
Wonderland (1999)	Music for David King's Book; The Commissar Vanishes; The Fall of Icarus (1999)	Nabbie's Love (1999)

Michael Nyman created a companion album of the same title in 1999. The second disc of the two-disc album contains The Fall of Icarus, the score to an eponymous art installation by Peter Greenaway from 1986 which had previously been unreleased. The first disc, The Commissar Vanishes, is a version of The Fall of Icarus that has been defaced similarly to the photographs reproduced in King's book.

=== Track listing ===
Disc 1: The Commissar Vanishes

1. Earth In Turmoil
2. Jealousy And Revenge
3. Look Out For An Enemy!
4. Ordinary Citizens
5. A Swift Exit

Disc: 2: The Fall of Icarus

1. Disaster
2. Wings
3. Walls
4. Water
5. Utopia

== Documentary ==
A documentary was made about David King and The Commissar Vanishes, called Facing the Dead, by Gabrielle Pfeiffer. The film was commissioned by Arte and broadcast internationally. It won the "Golden Gate Award" at the San Francisco International Film Festival.
