= Brian Deacon =

British actor

- Born: 13 February 1949 (age 77); Oxford, England
- Occupation: Actor
- Years active: 1971–present
- Spouses: Rula Lenska (m. 1977; div. 1987) Nathalie Bloch-Lainé (m. 1998)
- Children: 1

Brian Deacon (born 13 February 1949) is an English actor and voice actor. He is best known for his portrayal of Jesus Christ in the 1979 film Jesus.

== Life and career ==
Deacon was born in Oxford, where he later trained at the Oxford Youth Theatre. He made his West End debut in The Rivals at the New Wimbledon Theatre in 1972.

His other notable credits included playing Jesus Christ in the 1979 film Jesus (also known as The Jesus Movie). Deacon was chosen for the part out of a field of 900 actors screen tested by producer John Heyman. The film is claimed by its distributor, the Jesus Film Project (subsidiary of the evangelical organization Cru), to be the most-viewed film in history.

Deacon has also portrayed Heumac in The Feathered Serpent (1976, 1978) and Frank Miles in the 1978 TV series Lillie, and appeared with his brother, Eric, in the Peter Greenaway film A Zed & Two Noughts (1985), as Oswald Deuce. Between 1992 and 1993, he played the role of the Honourable Neil Kincaid in British soap opera Emmerdale, the lover of established character Kim Tate (Claire King).

Deacon's voice acting work includes the video games Star Wars Knights of the Old Republic II, Total War Saga: Troy, Ken Follett's The Pillars of the Earth, and The Dark Eye series.

== Personal life ==
He has been married twice, firstly to Rula Lenska (1977–1987), with whom he had a daughter, Lara Parker Deacon. In 1998, he married the French actress and producer Nathalie Bloch-Lainé.

Though he is well known for his portrayal of Jesus, Deacon describes himself as irreligious and a "lapsed Catholic" in a 2016 interview, saying: "I never completely abandoned [faith] or anything like that. I looked at comparative religions and still have my own spiritual belief system, which is very much my own and not one I would impose on others."

== Filmography ==
- The Guardians, episode "The Logical Approach" (1971)
- The Triple Echo (1972)
- Love and Mr Lewisham (1972) TV series
- Thirty-Minute Theatre, episode "Scarborough" (1972)
- ITV Sunday Night Theatre, episode "First Sight" (1972)
- Full House, TV series episode (25 November 1972)
- Public Eye, episode "It's a Woman's Privilege" (1973)
- Vampyres (1974)
- The Kiss (1974)
- Good Girl, (1974) TV series
- Churchill's People, episode "The Lost Island" (1975)
- The Emigrants, episodes "Chances for the Children" (1976), "Endeavour" (1976), "13,000 Miles Away" (1976) e "A Dream of Freedom" (1976)
- Centre Play, 1st episode "Risking It" (1977)
- The Feathered Serpent (1976–1978) TV series
- Lillie, episodes "Mrs. Langtry" (1978), "The Jersey Lily" (1978), "The New Helen" (1978), "Bertie" (1978), "Let Them Say" (1978), "The Sailor Prince" (1978) e "Going on the Stage" (1978)
- Jesus (1979)
- The New Media Bible: Book of Genesis (1980)
- Leap in the Dark, episode "Watching Me, Watching You" (1980)
- Nelly's Version (1983) TV film
- The First Part of King Henry VI (1983) TV film
- The Second Part of King Henry VI (1983) TV film
- The Third Part of King Henry VI (1983) TV film
- Richard III (1983) TV film
- Separate Tables (1983) TV film
- Hammer House of Mystery and Suspense, episode "And the Wall Came Tumbling Down" (1984)
- Mr. Palfrey of Westminster, episode "Freedom from Longing" (1985)
- Bleak House (1985) TV series
- A Zed & Two Noughts (1985)
- Screen Two, episode "Inappropriate Behaviour" (1987)
- Emmerdale, episode 1.1724 1.1725 (1992)
- Bugs, episode "Down Among the Dead Men" (1995)
- The Story of Jesus for Children (2000) Home Video only
- Star Wars: Knights of the Old Republic II – The Sith Lords (2004) video game (voice)
- Doctors, episodes "Face Value" (2001) and "Amends" (2009)
- Ceville (2009) video game (voice)
- The Projectionist (2012)
- The Night of the Rabbit (2013) video game (voice)
- Mistaken (2013)
