= String Quartets 2, 3 & 4/If & Why =

Studio album by Michael Nyman
- Released: 24 September 2002
- Genre: Contemporary classical, Chamber music, minimalism, art song
- Language: English
- Label: Black Box Classics

Michael Nyman chronology
The Claim (2000)	String Quartets 2, 3 & 4/If & Why (2002)	Facing Goya (2002)

Professional ratings
Review scores
Source	Rating
BBC	favorable

String Quartets 2, 3 & 4/If & Why is an album by Simon Haram, The Lyric Quartet, and members of The Michael Nyman Band, featuring music by Michael Nyman. "If" and "Why" are songs written for The Diary of Anne Frank, where they were performed by Hilary Summers and the Michael Nyman Band. Here, the melody lines are taken by Simon Haram's alto saxophone.

== Track listing ==
1. String Quartet No. 2
2. String Quartet No. 3
3. Miserere Paraphrase, for violin & piano
4. In Re Don Giovanni, for band
5. String Quartet No. 4 No. 1
6. String Quartet No. 4 No. 3
7. String Quartet No. 4 No. 6
8. String Quartet No. 4 No. 11
9. String Quartet No. 4 No. 12
10. If
11. Why

== Personnel ==
- Bruce White, viola
- Ian Humphries, violin
- Simon Haram, saxophone
- Anthony Hinnigan, cello
- Ann Morfee, violin
- Elizabeth Burley,
