= 2Graves =

Play by Paul Sellar and Michael Nyman

2Graves is a one-man play by the British playwright Paul Sellar with an original score by Michael Nyman. The story, which is performed in verse, tells of how protagonist Jack Topps (Jonathan Moore) became a criminal following his father's murder. 2Graves was the first performance to take place after the Arts Theatre in London's West End was refurbished in 2006. The Times and the Evening Standard were among many publications rating the play highly.

The playtext was published on the 7th of November 2007 by Obleron Books Ltd.
