= Drowning by Numbers =

- Theatrical release poster
- Directed by: Peter Greenaway
- Written by: Peter Greenaway
- Produced by: Kees Kasander; Denis Wigman
- Starring: Joan Plowright; Juliet Stevenson; Joely Richardson; Bernard Hill; Jason Edwards
- Cinematography: Sacha Vierny
- Edited by: John Wilson
- Music by: Michael Nyman
- Production companies: Film Four International; Elsevier-Vendex Film; Allarts Production
- Distributed by: Recorded Releasing (United Kingdom)
- Release date: 2 September 1988 (United Kingdom)
- Running time: 118 minutes
- Countries: United Kingdom; Netherlands
- Language: English
- Budget: £1 million
- Box office: $424,773

Drowning by Numbers is a 1988 crime comedy-drama film directed by Peter Greenaway. It won the award for Best Artistic Contribution at the Cannes Film Festival of 1988.

== Plot ==
The film opens with a little girl jumping rope and counting stars to "a hundred". The film's plot centres on three married women — a grandmother, her daughter, and her niece — each named Cissie Colpitts. As the story progresses, each woman successively drowns her husband. The three Cissie Colpittses are played by Joan Plowright, Juliet Stevenson and Joely Richardson, while Bernard Hill plays the coroner, Madgett, who is cajoled into covering up the three crimes.

The structure, with similar stories repeated three times, is reminiscent of a fairy tale, most specifically 'The Billy Goats Gruff', because Madgett is constantly promised greater rewards as he tries his luck with each of the Cissies in turn. The link to folklore is further established by Madgett's son Smut, who recites the rules of various unusual games played by the characters as if they were ancient traditions. Many of these games are invented for the film, including:

- Bees in the Trees
- Dawn Card Castles
- Deadman's Catch
- Flights of Fancy (or Reverse Strip Jump)
- The Great Death Game
- Hangman's Cricket
- The Hare and Hounds
- Sheep and Tides

In Drowning by Numbers, number-counting, the rules of games and the repetitions of the plot are all devices which emphasise structure. Through the course of the film each number from 1 to 100 appears, the large majority in sequence, often seen in the background, sometimes printed on cattle, sometimes spoken by the characters.

The repetitive, obsessive motif of the film echoes that of the soundtrack by Michael Nyman.

The film is set and was shot in and around Southwold, Suffolk, England, with key landmarks such as the Victorian water tower, Southwold Lighthouse, and the estuary of the River Blyth clearly identifiable.

== Cast ==
- Natalie Morse - the little skipping girl counting stars in the opening
- Joan Plowright – Cissie Colpitts
- Juliet Stevenson – Cissie Colpitts
- Joely Richardson – Cissie Colpitts
- Bernard Hill – Madgett
- Jason Edwards – Smut
- Bryan Pringle – Jake
- Trevor Cooper – Hardy
- David Morrissey – Bellamy
- John Rogan – Gregory
- Paul Mooney - Teigan
- Jane Gurnett - Nancy
- Kenny Ireland - Jonah Bognor
- Michael Percival - Moses Bognor
- Joanna Dickens - Mrs. Hardy
- Janine Duvitski - Marina Bellamy

== Music ==
Drowning by Numbers

Soundtrack album by Michael Nyman
- Released: 1988
- Recorded: 1988
- Genre: contemporary classical music, Minimalist music, film score
- Length: 44:48
- Label: Virgin, Caroline
- Director: Michael Nyman
- Producer: David Cunningham & Michael Nyman

Michael Nyman chronology
The Man Who Mistook His Wife for a Hat (1988)	Drowning by Numbers (1988)	La Traversée de Paris (1989)

Professional ratings
Review scores
Source	Rating
Allmusic	4/5 stars

On Greenaway's specific instructions, the film's musical score by Michael Nyman is entirely based on themes from the slow movement of Mozart's Sinfonia Concertante in E flat, which is heard in its original form immediately after each drowning. Greenaway alerted Nyman to the potential of this piece in the late 1970s and had previously requested he use bars 58 to 61 as material for part of the score of his The Falls, and Nyman adapted other themes from the piece for "The Masterwork" Award Winning Fish-Knife and Tristram Shandy. "Trysting Fields" is the most complicated use of the material: every appoggiatura from the movement, and no other material from the piece, is used.

The album is the tenth by Nyman and the seventh to feature the Michael Nyman Band.

=== Track listing ===
1. "Trysting Fields"
2. "Sheep and Tides"
3. "Great Death Game"
4. "Drowning by Number 3"
5. "Wheelbarrow Walk"
6. "Dead Man's Catch"
7. "Drowning by Number 2"
8. "Bees in Trees"
9. "Fish Beach"
10. "Wedding Tango"
11. "Crematorium Conspiracy"
12. "Knowing the Ropes"
13. "Endgame"

The back cover of the album booklet has a large number "58". Fred Ritzel has pointed out that the Skipping Girl (played by Natalie Morse) reaches number 58 in her counting game. These are subtle ways of drawing attention to the key bars of the Mozart piece.

== Reception ==
Reviews for Drowning by Numbers were mostly favourable. On the review aggregator website Rotten Tomatoes, 88% of 16 critics' reviews are positive, with an average rating of 7.1/10. Roger Ebert, however, gave the work two stars, praising its landscapes as beautifully photographed but also concluding, "When the movie was over, I was not sure why Greenaway made it."

=== Box Office ===
It made £220,000.

== In popular culture ==
- Émilie Gillet, designer of the Mutable Instruments range of electronic musical instruments and synthesizer modules, named alternative firmware for her Tides synthesiser module Sheep, in reference to the game featured in the film. Subsequently, alternative firmware called Bees-in-the-Trees, for the Mutable Instrument Braids synthesiser module, and Dead Man's Catch, for the Mutable Instrument Peaks module, have been published.
- Ambient electronic musician Yuri Tománek, who composed the music for the Netflix documentary series Cheer and Last Chance U releases recordings under the name Drowning by Numbers.
- The film helped to inspire Black metal band Farsot's 2017 album Fail-Lure.
- The How I Met Your Mother episode "Bad News" uses a numbering device inspired by the film. Numbers count down to the titular "Bad News", when character Marshall learns that his father has died.
- J. M. DeMatteis referenced the film in Marc Spector:"Moon Knight" #29.
