= The Man Who Mistook His Wife for a Hat (opera) =

Opera by Michael Nyman

The Man Who Mistook His Wife for a Hat is a one-act chamber opera by Michael Nyman to an English-language libretto by Christopher Rawlence, adapted from the case study of the same name by Oliver Sacks by Nyman, Rawlence, and Michael Morris. It was first performed at the Institute of Contemporary Arts, London, on 27 October 1986.

The minimalist score makes use of songs by Robert Schumann, in particular, "Ich grolle nicht" from Dichterliebe, in which Dr. S. accompanies Dr. P., singing the ossia as a descant. Mrs. P. plays the piano, the singer actually playing if possible.

== Roles ==
| Role | Voice type | Premiere Cast, 27 October 1986 (Conductor: Michael Nyman) |
|---|---|---|
| Dr. S., the neurologist | tenor | Emile Belcourt |
| Dr. P., a singer and music professor | baritone | Frederick Westcott |
| Mrs. P., his wife | soprano | Patricia Hooper |

== Synopsis ==
The plot concerns the investigation by a neurologist of the condition of a singer who has visual agnosia. According to the liner notes, Morris, Rawlence, and Nyman had to spend much time convincing the real Mrs. P. (whose husband is implied to have been a known name) that they were not proposing a musical (her word) that would trivialize her late husband's situation in order to gain her consent.

== Film ==
Rawlence made a film version in 1987. It made brief omissions from the music (most notably the self-referential line, "That's Nyman! Can't mistake his body rhythm," when Dr. P. is watching television) and added documentary segments with Sacks and pathologist John Tighe working with the actual Dr. P.'s brain. They reveal that his condition was the result of Alzheimer's disease that atypically affected only one portion of his brain until its latter stages. Unusually for an opera film not shot on a theatre stage, the singing was recorded live on-set by boom operators.

Returning from the original cast were Emile Belcourt as Dr. S. and Frederick Westcott as Dr. P. Patricia Hooper replaced Sarah Leonard as Mrs. P. The Michael Nyman Band appeared on-screen as Dr. P.'s students. Originally distributed on VHS by Films, Inc., its rarity has caused it to become a popular bootleg favorite.

== Recordings ==
The Man Who Mistook His Wife for a Hat
- Design by Howard Fritzson painting: David Bomberg, Lyons Café, 1912

Studio album by Michael Nyman
- Released: 1988
- Recorded: 1987
- Genre: Opera, Contemporary classical music, minimalism
- Length: 57:05
- Language: English, German
- Label: CBS Masterworks
- Producer: David Cunningham, Michael Nyman

Michael Nyman chronology
| And Do They Do/Zoo Caprices (1986) | The Man Who Mistook His Wife for a Hat (1988) | Drowning by Numbers (1988) |

CBS Masterworks MK44669 (1987); Emile Belcourt (tenor), Sarah Leonard (soprano), Frederick Westcott (baritone), Alexander Balanescu (first violin), Jonathan Carney (second violin), Kate Musker (viola), Moray Welsh (first cello), Anthony Hinnigan (second cello), Helen Tunstall (harp), conducted by the composer. Carney, Musker, and Hinnigan, who will make up the first lineup of the Balanescu Quartet, make their first of many appearances on a Nyman album with this release.

Nashville Opera Association released a new recording of the opera on Naxos Records in 2016. Associated with a full production of the opera, it is conducted by Dean Williamson and features singers Matthew Treviño, Rebecca Sjöwall, and Ryan MacPherson. Members of the Nashville Opera Orchestra Dave Davidson, Connie Ellisor, Simona Rusu, Michael Samis, Sari Reist, Mary Alice Hoepfinger, and Amy Tate Williams make up the instrumental chamber ensemble. Notably, some elements absent from the sheet music but present on the original recording, such as Dr. P vocalizing while searching for his hat, are omitted.
