= Carrington (film) =

1995 film

- Theatrical release poster
- Directed by: Christopher Hampton
- Screenplay by: Christopher Hampton
- Based on: Lytton Strachey by Michael Holroyd
- Produced by: John McGrath; Ronald Shedlo
- Starring: Emma Thompson; Jonathan Pryce; Steven Waddington; Rufus Sewell; Samuel West; Penelope Wilton
- Cinematography: Denis Lenoir
- Edited by: George Akers
- Music by: Michael Nyman
- Production companies: Le Studio Canal+; Euston Films
- Distributed by: PolyGram Filmed Entertainment
- Release dates: 22 September 1995 (United Kingdom); 10 November 1995 (United States)
- Running time: 120 minutes
- Countries: United Kingdom; France
- Language: English
- Box office: $17 million

Carrington is a 1995 British biographical film written and directed by Christopher Hampton about the life of the English painter Dora Carrington (1893–1932), who was known simply as "Carrington". The screenplay is based on Lytton Strachey: A Critical Biography, the 1967–68 two-volume biography of writer and critic Lytton Strachey (1880–1932) by Michael Holroyd.

== Plot summary ==
The film, starring Emma Thompson in the title role, focuses on her unusual relationship with the author Lytton Strachey, played by Jonathan Pryce, as well as with other members of the Bloomsbury Group.

The film is divided into six chapters.

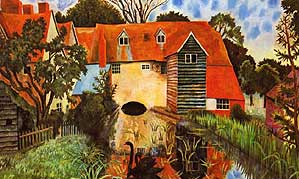
The Mill at Tidmarsh, a 1918 painting by Carrington of the Mill House, Tidmarsh, Pangbourne, on the upper Thames

1. Lytton & Carrington 1915: During the Great War, Lytton Strachey is travelling to the country and staying at Vanessa Bell's house. There he meets Carrington for the first time, initially assuming she is a boy and not hiding his disappointment when disabused. Lytton is due to face a hearing with the military to decide his fate as a conscientious objector. While taking a countryside hike, Carrington shares with Lytton a similar disappointment at not being a boy. Lytton forces an awkward kiss onto Carrington, infuriating her. Early the next morning, Carrington walks into his bedroom intending to cut his beard off in retaliation for the kiss, but stops in contemplation of him sleeping and falls in love with him. Lytton avoids war and prison on medical grounds.
2. Gertler 1916–1918: Mark Gertler has been attempting to have sex with Carrington for four years, with a great number of their shared circle conspiring to pressure Carrington to acquiesce. Lytton is ostensibly part of these machinations but the two end up falling deeper into their own relationship. While on a trip to Wales, Lytton proposes that he and Carrington live together: acting on this, Carrington searches for a house and finds and refurbishes Mill House in Tidmarsh. She and Lytton share a bed, and have non-penetrative sex when Carrington masturbates him. Soon after Carrington unpleasantly gives in to Gertler's demand for penetration. When Gertler later finds out that Carrington and Lytton are moving in together, he causes a scene at a party and after Carrington and Lytton leave, Gertler assaults Lytton in the street.
3. Partridge 1918–1921: Carrington meets Ralph Partridge, who has come back from the war. Her relationship with Lytton has taken on a sadomasochistic cast, and she introduces Ralph in the hopes that Lytton will be attracted to him. Ralph expresses his contempt for conscientious objectors and bemusement at the successful publication of Eminent Victorians; nevertheless the rugged man has great appeal to Lytton and the three of them embark on a relationship. Lytton goes on vacation to Italy. Ralph has made clear his intent of either marrying Carrington or emigrating to Bolivia to run a sheep farm. Ralph bullies Carrington into believing that, if Ralph is no longer with him, Lytton will move out of Mill House. Carrington marries Ralph and writes Lytton a poignant letter reifying their devotion to each other, to which Lytton responds in kind. On their honeymoon, Carrington and Ralph meet with Lytton in Venice, who seems pleased with how things have shaken out.
4. Brenan 1921–1923: Despite her marriage, Carrington continues to spend most of her time at Mill House while Ralph remains largely in London. Carrington presumes Ralph has managed to pursue affairs in the city. Ralph introduces his friend Gerald Brenan to Lytton and Carrington. Brenan is planning to leave for Spain for the sake of economy and takes a liking to Carrington, which is mutual. He demands she leave Lytton to be with him. She refuses but they continue the relationship until they get caught by Ralph. Lytton manages to persuade Ralph not to leave Carrington and secretly Carrington and Brenan continue the affair.
5. Ham Spray House 1924–1931: Lytton and Ralph jointly buy Ham Spray House. Lytton moves in with Carrington while Ralph, Brenan and others are frequent guests. In 1924 Henrietta Bingham leaves Carrington. Subsequently, Carrington stops having sex with Brenan in 1925 and in 1926 Ralph begins an affair with Frances Marshall in London. By 1929, Lytton is in a sadomasochistic relationship with Roger Stenhouse whilst Carrington, following a series of largely unrequited lesbian affairs, is seeing Beacus Penrose, a strapping seaman with little to say who tries to change her to fit his fantasies. She becomes pregnant by Beacus but has an abortion. Lytton takes an apartment in London where he intends to live with Roger, but it becomes clear that the relationship will not last.
6. Lytton 1931–1932: Roger and Lytton break up, Beacus loses interest in Carrington. During a tea party Lytton becomes ill; Carrington is initially optimistic but it becomes evident that his illness is terminal. Carrington tries to commit suicide by locking herself in the garage with the car motor running but is rescued by Ralph. When Lytton finally dies, attended by Ralph, Carrington and Gerald, he states "If this is dying, I don't think much of it." Carrington is devastated and buys a rifle but also makes plans to travel in the near future. Once all the guests have finally left, Carrington burns Lytton's personal possessions. Eventually, after another botched attempt, Carrington resolves and goes through with shooting herself. The wound ends up being fatal. Ralph and Frances go on to be conscientious objectors in The Second World War.

== Cast ==
- Emma Thompson as Dora Carrington
- Jonathan Pryce as Lytton Strachey
- Steven Waddington as Ralph Partridge
- Samuel West as Gerald Brenan
- Rufus Sewell as Mark Gertler
- Penelope Wilton as Lady Ottoline Morrell
- Janet McTeer as Vanessa Bell
- Peter Blythe as Phillip Morrell
- Jeremy Northam as Beacus Penrose
- Alex Kingston as Frances Partridge
- Sebastian Harcombe as Roger Senhouse
- Richard Clifford as Clive Bell
- David Ryall as Mayor
- Stephen Boxer as Military Rep
- Annabel Mullion as Mary Hutchinson

== Music ==
Carrington

Soundtrack album by Michael Nyman
- Released: 1 September 1995 (UK); 3 October 1995 (US)
- Recorded: 10–11 November 1994, Abbey Road Studios, London
- Genres: Soundtrack, Contemporary classical, Minimalist music
- Length: 67:15
- Label: Argo
- Producer: Michael Nyman

Michael Nyman chronology
Noises, Sounds & Sweet Airs (1995)	Carrington (1995)	The Diary of Anne Frank (1995)

The score of the film was composed by Michael Nyman. It was primarily based upon his String Quartet No.3, with which Hampton created a temp track, and wanted as a leitmotif for Lytton Strachey. The score is also based on Schubert's String Quintet in C, D. 956, whose Adagio is played during a scene in the film. However, there is also newly composed material for the film, including "Virgin on the roof," which was incorporated into the String Quartet No. 4, and the theme for Mark Gertler, which is derived from 3 Quartets, which was composed at roughly the same time.

1. "Outside Looking In" - 9:14
2. "Opening Titles" - 1:21
3. "Fly Drive" - 1:40
4. "Cliffs of Fall" - 2:00
5. "Every Curl of your Beard" - 2:24
6. "Virgin on the Roof" - 1:40
7. "Gertler" - 3:15
8. "Leaving Gertler" - 1:27
9. "Painting the Garden of Eden" - 1:59
10. "Partridge" - 1:54
11. "Floating the Honeymoon" - 2:45
12. "Brenan" - 6:53
13. "Beacus" - 2:58
14. "Leaving Brenan" - 1:59
15. "Ham Spray House" - 1:39
16. "The Infinite Complexities of Christmas" - 4:18
17. "Something Rather Impulsive" - 1:48
18. "If This is Dying" - 1:46
19. Franz Schubert: String Quintet in C: Adagio – Amadeus Quartet/Robert Cohen (1987 recording-Polydor/Deutsche Grammophon) - 15:11

== Reception ==
=== Critical reception ===
Review aggregator website Rotten Tomatoes retroactively gave the film an approval rating of 58% based on 31 reviews, and an average rating of 6.3/10.

In 2008, British film critic David Thomson opined that Carrington is "the best film about this moment and group [the Bloomsbury Group], in great part because it has the sense to concentrate on a fringe figure". Moreover, in his opinion, it is "Emma Thompson's finest acting in film" and "the best thing Jonathan Pryce has ever done". Six years later Thomson reinforced this by observing that "[Pryce's] superb Lytton Strachey in the little-seen Carrington ... is unmistakably the work of a great actor."

A 2010 review of the film in The Guardian summarised the film; "Drawing extensively on its subjects' diaries and letters, Carrington is certainly an accurate historical movie – but not a particularly revealing one." The review graded the movie as A− in historicity and C as entertainment.

In the United Kingdom it opened 22 October 1995 on 50 screens and grossed £95,093 in its opening weekend. It went on to gross £684,898 in the UK. Worldwide it grossed $17 million.

=== Awards ===
1995 Cannes Film Festival

- Special Jury Prize
- Best Actor for Jonathan Pryce

1995 National Board of Review

- Best Actress - Emma Thompson (with Sense and Sensibility)

1996 Evening Standard British Film Awards

- Best Actor - Jonathan Pryce
