= The Piano (soundtrack) =

- art by Dave McKean

Soundtrack album by Michael Nyman
- Released: 19 October 1993
- Genre: Soundtrack
- Length: 56:47 (USA); 60:40 (UK, USA remastered edition)
- Label: Virgin
- Producer: Michael Nyman

Michael Nyman chronology
Time Will Pronounce (1993)	The Piano (1993)	Michael Nyman for Yohji Yamamoto (1993)

Singles from The Piano
- 1. "The Heart Asks Pleasure First/The Promise" Released: 1993

The Piano is the original soundtrack, on the Virgin Records label, of the 1993 Academy Award-winning film The Piano. The original score was composed by Michael Nyman and is his twentieth album release. Despite being called a "soundtrack", this is a partial score re-recording, as Nyman himself also performs the piano on the album (whereas the film version is performed by lead actress Holly Hunter). The music is performed by the Munich Philharmonic Orchestra, conducted by Nyman, with Michael Nyman Band members John Harle, David Roach and Andrew Findon performing the prominent saxophone work.

The album was nominated for the Golden Globe Award for Best Original Score (but lost to the score of Heaven & Earth) and the BAFTA Award for Best Score (lost to the score of Schindler's List).

The album design and illustration are by Dave McKean.

Nyman said the most famous theme "The Heart Asks Pleasure First" is based on a popular Scottish song titled "Gloomy Winter's Noo Awa", which is set to the traditional tune "Lord Balgownie’s Favourite". The closing edit is similar to the Scottish song used in Beethoven's Sunset.

Two additional solo piano pieces, "The Attraction of the Pedalling Ankle", which is based on Frédéric Chopin's Mazurka Op. 7/i, and "Deep Sleep Playing" are featured in the film, the former in scenes 51, 57, and 88, and the latter in scene 100. While not on the album, they are included in the published sheet music.

== Critical reception ==
Professional ratings
Review scores
Source	Rating
AllMusic	3/5 stars
Entertainment Weekly	C+

In a review for AllMusic, Michael Gallucci described the soundtrack as "subtle, pretty, and just a little bit bland.", going on to opine that "Nyman keeps the theatrics to a minimum, crafting an evocative work that manages to be both personal and universal. He also lets the music run its course, never pushing or cutting off a piece until it says what it needs to."

Ty Burr, writing for Entertainment Weekly, wrote that compared with Nyman's previous soundtrack score The Cook, the Thief, His Wife & Her Lover (1989), which has "the power to lift viewers into a gorgeously chilly stratosphere", The Piano soundtrack's "emphasis on solo piano leaves [Nyman] sounding like a Windham Hill wannabe.", also stating that "The score actually works better on screen than on disc".

== Track listing ==
All music composed by Michael Nyman.

No.	Title	Length
1.	"To the Edge of the Earth"	4:06
2.	"Big My Secret"	2:51
3.	"A Wild and Distant Shore"	5:50
4.	"The Heart Asks Pleasure First"	1:33
5.	"Here to There"	1:02
6.	"The Promise"	4:14
7.	"A Bed of Ferns"	0:46
8.	"The Fling"	1:28
9.	"The Scent of Love"	4:16
10.	"Deep into the Forest"	2:58
11.	"The Mood That Passes Through You"	1:13
12.	"Lost and Found"	2:24
13.	"The Embrace"	2:36
14.	"Little Impulse"	2:11
15.	"The Sacrifice"	2:46
16.	"I Clipped Your Wing"	4:34
17.	"The Wounded"	2:26
18.	"All Imperfect Things"	4:03
19.	"Dreams of a Journey"	5:30
20.	"The Heart Asks Pleasure First/The Promise" (Edit)	3:11

Note: Track 20 ("The Heart Asks Pleasure First/The Promise") was not included on the American release until the remastered version in 2004, but included on the British version in the initial release.

== Personnel ==
Musicians

- The Munich Philharmonic – symphony orchestra
- Michael Nyman – piano, arranger, conductor
- John Harle – soprano & alto saxophone
- David Roach– soprano & alto saxophone
- Andrew Findon – tenor & baritone saxophone, flute, alto flute

Technical

- Produced by Michael Nyman
- Engineer: Michael J. Dutton
- Executive engineer: Malcolm Luker
- Assistant engineer: Jamie Luker
- Recorded at Arco Studios, Munich
- Mixed and edited at Kitsch Studios, Brussels
- Post-production at Abbey Road, London
- Design and illustration by Dave McKean
- Photography by Grant Matthews and Polly Walker
- Artist representative for Michael Nyman: Nigel Barr

== Charts ==
=== Weekly charts ===
Weekly chart performance for The Piano
Chart (1993–94)	Peak position
Australian Albums (ARIA)	11
Dutch Albums (Album Top 100)	59
European Albums (European Top 100 Albums)	18
New Zealand Albums (RMNZ)	3
Spanish Albums (AFYVE)	1
Swedish Albums (Sverigetopplistan)	29
UK Albums (OCC)	31

=== Year-end charts ===
1994 year-end chart performance for The Piano
Chart (1994)	Position
Australian Albums (ARIA)	67
European Albums (European Top 100 Albums)	73
New Zealand Albums (RMNZ)	31

== Certifications ==
Certifications and sales for The Piano
Region	Certification	Certified units/sales
Canada (Music Canada)	Gold	50,000^{^}
New Zealand (RMNZ)	Platinum	15,000^{^}
Poland (ZPAV)	Platinum	100,000^{*}
Spain (Promusicae)	Platinum	100,000^{^}
Switzerland (IFPI Switzerland)	Gold	25,000^{^}
United Kingdom (BPI)	Gold	100,000^{^}
United States (RIAA)	Gold	500,000^{^}
^{*} Sales figures based on certification alone.^{^} Shipments figures based on certification alone.

== Use in other media ==
Several of the pieces from The Piano soundtrack were used in Alexander McQueen's Autumn/Winter 2006 fashion show.

Japanese figure skater Kaori Sakamoto used music from The Piano in her free program for the 2018/19 season. With the program, she placed first in the 2018 Japan Figure Skating Championships.

== Re-recordings and cover versions ==
The music from The Piano has been re-recorded numerous times by different artists, and became the basis of Nyman's 1994 composition, The Piano Concerto which debuted in 1994. Perhaps the most unusual re-recording is by conductor Bill Broughton and the Orchestra of the Americas—an orchestral version without piano. "Here to There", a saxophone solo, has become something of a staple for contemporary classical saxophonists.

The Finnish symphonic metal band Nightwish made a cover of "The Heart Asks Pleasure First" intended for their 2007 album Dark Passion Play that includes lyrics written by Nightwish composer and keyboardist, Tuomas Holopainen, but the band did not receive permission to release it in time for the album's release. However, the song was still played live via playback as the outro to the final concert of the Dark Passion Play World Tour held in Helsinki, Finland on 19 September 2009. On 15 December 2009, Jarmo Lautamäki, a Nightwish crew member, confirmed on his Facebook page that Nyman finally gave permission to release the cover. It was released on 2 March 2012 as a B-side on the single "The Crow, the Owl and the Dove".

In December 2010 Italian rock noir band Belladonna released "Let There Be Light", a single written in collaboration with Nyman and based on "The Heart Asks Pleasure First". Nyman himself plays piano on the track.
