= The Actors =

- Directed by: Conor McPherson
- Written by: Conor McPherson
- Produced by: Neil Jordan; Redmond Morris
- Starring: Michael Caine; Dylan Moran; Lena Headey; Michael Gambon; Miranda Richardson; Michael McElhatton; Abigail Iversen; Aisling O'Sullivan; Ben Miller; Simon Delaney; Alvaro Lucchesi
- Cinematography: Seamus McGarvey
- Edited by: Emer Reynolds
- Music by: Michael Nyman
- Production companies: FilmFour; Miramax Films; Senator Film; Bord Scannán na hÉireann/Irish Film Board; Four Provinces Films; Company of Wolves
- Distributed by: Momentum Pictures
- Release date: 17 April 2003
- Running time: 91 minutes
- Country: Ireland
- Language: English

The Actors is a 2003 Irish film written and directed by Conor McPherson and starring Dylan Moran and Michael Caine. In supporting roles are Michael Gambon, Miranda Richardson and Lena Headey.

== Plot ==
The Actors is a contemporary comedy set in Dublin. It follows the exploits of two mediocre stage actors as they devise a plan to con a retired gangster out of £50,000. The gangster owes the money to a third party, whom he has never met.

The actors take advantage of this fact by impersonating this 'unidentified' third party, and claiming the debt as their own. To pull it off they enlist Moran's eerily intelligent nine-year-old niece, who restructures the plan each time something goes wrong.

The two protagonists are acting in a version of Shakespeare's Richard III in which everyone dresses in Nazi uniform, a nod to Ian McKellen's production.

The film is centred on the Olympia Theatre, and it is noteworthy for featuring the famous glass awning over the entrance which has since been destroyed in a traffic accident. The glass awning has since been rebuilt to its full former glory.

== Cast ==
- Michael Caine as Anthony O'Malley
- Dylan Moran as Tom Quirk
- Lena Headey as Dolores
- Abigail Iversen as Mary
- Aisling O'Sullivan as Rita
- Ben Miller as Clive
- Michael Gambon as Barreller
- Simon Delaney as Ronnie
- Alvaro Lucchesi as Lesley
- Michael McElhatton as Jock
- Miranda Richardson as Mrs. Magnani
- Alison Doody as herself
- Marty Whelan as himself
- Deirdre O'Kane as Stage Manager

== Reception ==
Empire gives the film 2/5, describing it as "Based on an idea by Neil Jordan, The Actors had the potential to be gut-achingly funny. But instead it ends up raising a few paltry smiles."

== Soundtrack ==
The Actors

Soundtrack album by Michael Nyman, Conor McPherson, Fionnula Flanagan
- Released: 19 May 2003
- Genres: Soundtrack, contemporary classical, minimalism
- Language: English
- Label: EMI Records

Michael Nyman chronology
Sangam: Michael Nyman Meets Indian Masters (2003)	The Actors (2003)	Man and Boy: Dada (2004)

1. Act One - The Michael Nyman Band and Moss Hall Junior Choir
2. Star Of The Sea - Laura Cullinan, Bebhinn Ni Chiosain, Cliona Ni Chiosain & Niamh H Reynolds
3. Zinc Bar Walk - The Michael Nyman Band
4. A Certain Party - The Michael Nyman Band
5. House On Fire - The Michael Nyman Band
6. Act Two - The Michael Nyman Band
7. Could This Be Love? - Lena Headey & Dylan Moran
8. Mary Directs Tom - The Michael Nyman Band
9. Una's Waltz - Una Ni Chiosain/Conor McPherson
10. Rope Trick - The Michael Nyman Band
11. Dolores On The Beach - The Michael Nyman Band
12. Return To The Scene Of The Crime - The Michael Nyman Band
13. Seems So Long - Cathy Davey
14. Wheelchair Chase - The Michael Nyman Band
15. Tubbetstown Elegy - The Michael Nyman Band
16. Lovely Morning - Cathy Davey
17. Mrs O'Growny Appears - The Michael Nyman Band
18. Zinc Piano - The Michael Nyman Band
19. Final Act - The Michael Nyman Band
