= The Falls (1980 film) =

- Directed by: Peter Greenaway
- Written by: Peter Greenaway
- Music by: Michael Nyman
- Release date: 1980
- Running time: 185 min
- Country: United Kingdom
- Language: English

The Falls is a 1980 film directed by Peter Greenaway. It was Greenaway's first feature-length film after many years making shorts. It does not have a traditional dramatic narrative; it takes the form of a mock documentary in 92 short parts.

== Plot ==
The world has been struck by a mysterious incident called the "Violent Unknown Event" or VUE, which has killed many people and left a great many survivors suffering from a common set of symptoms: mysterious ailments (some appearing to be mutations of evolving into a bird-like form), dreaming of water (categorised by form, such as Category 1, Flight, or Category 3, Waves) and becoming obsessed with birds and flight. Many of the survivors have been gifted with new languages. They have also stopped ageing, making them immortal (barring disease or injury).

A directory of these survivors has been compiled, and The Falls is presented as a film version of an excerpt from that directory, corresponding to the 92 entries for persons whose surnames begin with the letters FALL-. Not all of the 92 entries correspond to a person – some correspond to deleted entries, cross references and other oddities of the administrative process that has produced the directory. One biography concerns two people – the twin brothers Ipson and Pulat Fallari, who are played (in still photographs) by the Brothers Quay.

The Falls includes clips of a number of Greenaway's early shorts. It also anticipates some of his later films: the subject of biography 27, Propine Fallax, is a pseudonym for Cissie Colpitts, the central figure of Drowning by Numbers (1988), while the car accident in biography 28 prefigures that in A Zed and Two Noughts (1985).

The largely formal and deadpan manner of the narration contrasts with the absurdity of the content.

== Soundtrack ==
The soundtrack is mainly by Michael Nyman and is partly based, like his later music for Drowning by Numbers, on the slow movement of Mozart's Sinfonia Concertante for Violin, Viola and Orchestra K. 364. It also includes numerous clips from various songs popular among the avant-garde of the time, including pieces by Brian Eno (in particular "Golden Hours" from Another Green World) and snippets of "Jugband Blues", the last song Syd Barrett recorded with Pink Floyd.

== Reception ==
The Falls has an 80% approval rating on Rotten Tomatoes, with Nathan Lee of The Village Voice calling it "the most playful and engaging of Greenaway's compositions".

Vincent Canby writing in the New York Times gave The Falls a mostly positive review, saying 'though The Falls is much too long for its own good, its rewards are real'.
