= Temp track =

Existing piece of audio used in editing film

A temp track is an existing piece of music or audio which is used during the editing phase of television and film production, serving as a guideline for the tempo, mood or atmosphere the director is looking for in a scene. It is also referred to as scratch music, temp score or temp music.

The track is usually replaced before release by an original soundtrack composed specifically for the film. While some feel that having to follow a temp track can be limiting for a composer, it can be a useful tool in finding the right style of music for a particular scene and can be a time-saver for both the composer and director.
