= Michael Nyman =

English composer and pianist (born 1944)

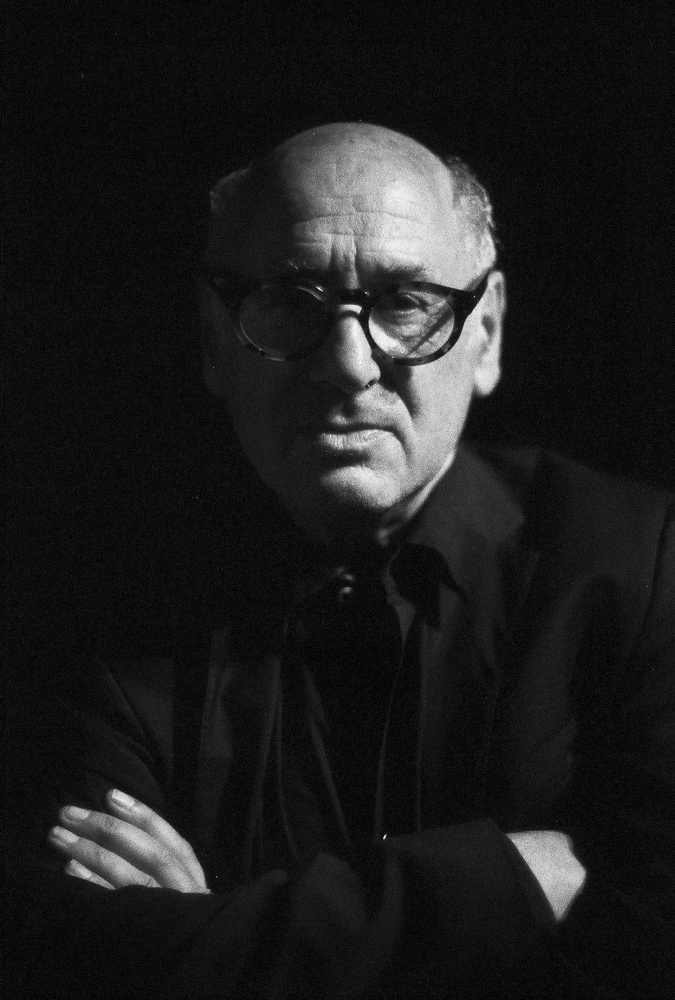
- Nyman in 2015

Background information
- Born: March 23, 1944 (age 82); Stratford, London, UK
- Genres: Minimalism; avant-garde; experimental music
- Website: www.michaelnyman.com

Michael Laurence Nyman, CBE (born 23 March 1944) is an English composer, pianist, librettist, musicologist, and filmmaker. He is known for numerous film scores (many written during his lengthy collaboration with the filmmaker Peter Greenaway), and his multi-platinum soundtrack album to Jane Campion's The Piano. He has written a number of operas, including The Man Who Mistook His Wife for a Hat; Letters, Riddles and Writs; Noises, Sounds & Sweet Airs; Facing Goya; Man and Boy: Dada; Love Counts; and Sparkie: Cage and Beyond. He has written six concerti, five string quartets, and many other chamber works, many for his Michael Nyman Band. He is also a performing pianist. Nyman prefers to write opera over other forms of music.

== Early life and education ==
Nyman was born in Stratford, London, to a family of secular Jewish furriers who immigrated from Poland.

Nyman was educated at the Sir George Monoux Grammar School, Walthamstow. He studied from 1961 until 1967 at King's College London, and at the Royal Academy of Music until 1967 with Alan Bush and Thurston Dart, focusing on piano and seventeenth-century baroque music. He won the Howard Carr Memorial Prize for composition in July 1964. In 1965–66 Nyman secured a residency in Romania to study folk-song, supported by a British Council bursary.

== Career ==
=== Work as music critic, 1968–1976 ===
Nyman says he discovered his aesthetic by playing the aria "Madamina, il catalogo è questo" from Mozart's Don Giovanni on his piano in the style of Jerry Lee Lewis, which "dictated the dynamic, articulation and texture of everything I've subsequently done." It subsequently became the base for his 1977 piece In Re Don Giovanni.

In 1969, Nyman provided the libretto of Harrison Birtwistle's opera Down by the Greenwood Side and directed the short film Love Love Love (based on the Beatles' "All You Need Is Love"). He then settled into music criticism, where he is generally acknowledged to have been the first to define the term "minimalism" as it applied to music, in a 1968 article in The Spectator magazine about the English composer Cornelius Cardew. He used the term 'minimal-music' which he defined as 'simple idea, straightforward structure, intellectual control, theatrical presence and intensity in presentation.'

He also wrote introductions for George Frideric Handel's Concerti grossi, Op. 6, and interviewed George Brecht in 1976. His 1976 album Decay Music was produced by Brian Eno. In 1974 Nyman published an influential book called Experimental Music: Cage and Beyond, which explored the influence of John Cage on classical composers.

=== Founding of Campiello Band and collaboration with Peter Greenaway, 1976–1990 ===
In the 1970s, Nyman was a member of the Portsmouth Sinfonia – the self-described World's Worst Orchestra. He was the featured pianist on the orchestra's recording of "Bridge Over Troubled Water" on the 1979 Martin Lewis-produced 20 Classic Rock Classics album, on which the Sinfonia gave their unique interpretations of the pop and rock repertoire of the 1950s–1970s.

In 1976, he formed the Campiello Band, which became the Michael Nyman Band, for a production of Carlo Goldoni's Il Campiello. Originally made up of old instruments such as rebecs and shawms alongside more modern instruments like the saxophone to produce as loud a sound as possible without amplification, the band later switched to a fully amplified line-up of string quartet, three saxophones, trumpet, horn, bass trombone, bass guitar and piano. Many of Nyman's works are written for his ensemble, with the lineup variously altered and augmented.

One of his earliest film scores was the 1976 British sex comedy Keep It Up Downstairs, followed by numerous films, many of them European art films, including eleven directed by Peter Greenaway. Nyman drew frequently on early music sources in his scores for Greenaway's films: Henry Purcell in The Draughtsman's Contract (1982) and The Cook, the Thief, His Wife & Her Lover (1989) (which included Memorial and Miserere Paraphrase), Heinrich Ignaz Franz Biber in A Zed & Two Noughts (1985), Wolfgang Amadeus Mozart in Drowning by Numbers (1988), and John Dowland in Prospero's Books (1991), largely at the request of the director. He wrote settings to various texts by Mozart for Letters, Riddles and Writs, part of Not Mozart.

In 1987 Nyman composed the opera Noises, Sounds & Sweet Airs, for soprano, alto, tenor and instrumental ensemble (based on Nyman's score for the ballet La Princesse de Milan); the opera The Man Who Mistook His Wife for a Hat (1986), based on a case-study by Oliver Sacks; and five string quartets. He also recorded pop music with the Flying Lizards; a version of his Bird List from the soundtrack to Peter Greenaway's The Falls (1980) appears on their album Fourth Wall as "Hands 2 Take".

=== 1990s ===
In 1990 he composed Ariel Songs for soprano and band; in 1993 MGV (Musique à Grande Vitesse) for band and orchestra; concertos for saxophone, piano (based on the score for The Piano), violin, harpsichord, trombone, and saxophone & cello recorded by John Harle and Julian Lloyd Webber;

In 1991 Nyman composed The Michael Nyman Songbook based on poetry by Paul Celan, Arthur Rimbaud, Wolfgang Amadeus Mozart and William Shakespeare. His Six Celan Songs off this collection were composed for Ute Lemper, with whom he recorded the album. Ute Lemper also performed in the 1992 concert film of the same name, directed by Volker Schlöndorff.

In 1993, Nyman's popularity increased after he wrote the score to Jane Campion's award-winning 1993 film The Piano. The album became a classical music best-seller, selling over three million copies. His soundtrack won an Ivor Novello Award, a Golden Globe, a BAFTA and an American Film Institute award, and nominated for a British Academy Award and a Golden Globe. He produced a soundtrack for the silent film Man with a Movie Camera, which largely reworked material he wrote for the soundtrack of the 1996 video game Enemy Zero.

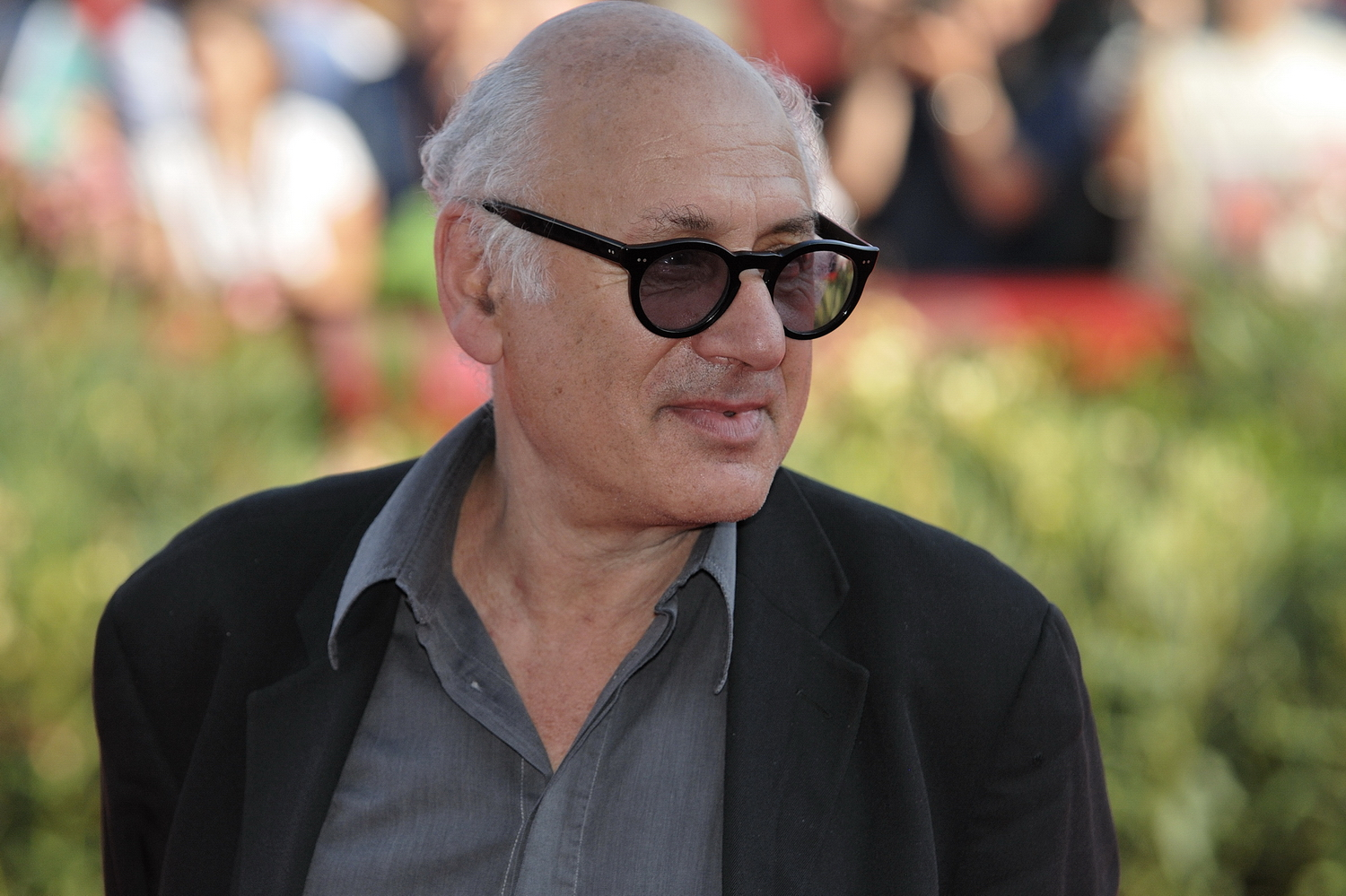
Nyman at the 2009 Venice Film Festival

His forays into Hollywood were Gattaca (1997), Ravenous (1999) (with musician Damon Albarn), and The End of the Affair (1999). Gattaca was nominated for a Saturn Award for Best Music.

In 1999, Nyman created a group called Foster's Social Orchestra, which specialised in the work of Stephen Foster. One of their pieces appeared in the film Ravenous and an additional work, not used in the film, appeared on the soundtrack album.

=== 21st century ===
In 2000, he produced an opera on the subject of cloning on a libretto by Victoria Hardie titled Facing Goya, an expansion of their one-act opera Vital Statistics. The lead, a widowed art banker, is written for contralto and the role was created by Hilary Summers. His newest operas are Man and Boy: Dada (2003) and Love Counts (2005), both on libretti by Michael Hastings.

From 2002 to 2005 he was a composer-in-residence at the Badisches Staatstheater Karlsruhe, Germany.

He composed the music for the children's television series Titch which is based on the books written and illustrated by Pat Hutchins.

On 7 July 2007, Nyman performed at Live Earth in Japan. Nyman began a long-term artistic collaboration with the filmmaker Max Pugh which resulted in many short art films, three experimental feature documentaries and a number of video installations. In 2008 Nyman realised, in collaboration with the cultural association Volumina, Sublime, an artist's book that unified his music with his passion for photography.

In October 2009, Nyman released The Glare, a collaborative collection of songs with David McAlmont. The album – recorded with the Michael Nyman Band – finds McAlmont putting lyrics based on contemporary news stories to 11 pieces of Nyman music drawn from different phases of his career.

In 2012, he made a soundtrack for film, Everyday. Keith H. Yoo in 2012 commissioned Nyman to write a 26-minute piano quintet in four movements titled Through the Only Window. It premiered at the gala dinner for his father Yoo Byung-eun's photographic exhibition "Through My Window" in the Tuileries Garden of The Louvre in Paris on 25 June 2012. The work has been recorded by Nyman Quintet in the Abbey Road Studios, and has been released on Nyman's record label. In 2013 Nyman was again commissioned to compose a piece for Yoo Byung-eun's exhibition in the Orangerie Hall of the Palace of Versailles, and wrote the 32-minute-long symphony in four movements, Symphony No. 6 "AHAE", representing the four seasons in nature as depicted by Ahae, a pseudonym for Yoo Byung-eun. The London Symphony Orchestra premiered both pieces at L'Opéra of the Palace of Versailles in Paris on 8 September 2013 under the baton of the composer. They were also recorded. In 2015 he performed in Dziga Vertov's Man with a Movie Camera at the Potemkin Stairs. The show was part of the 6th Odesa International Film Festival and gathered approximately 15,000 spectators.

== Personal life ==
Nyman was married to Aet Nyman (née Toome), with whom he has two daughters, Molly and Martha, but they are now divorced. His first string quartet quotes "Unchained Melody" in homage to Aet, who appears in Greenaway's The Falls, for which he also composed music. Molly is also a composer and in collaboration with Harry Escott has written several film scores, including for The Road to Guantanamo by her father's frequent collaborator Michael Winterbottom. Martha is a development researcher for the BBC.

In 2005, Nyman reported that he had been a supporter of Queens Park Rangers F.C. for 33 years.

Nyman has been misidentified as having signed a pro-Israel open letter during the 2014 Gaza War. The cited article states the following: "CORRECTION: An earlier version of this story said that composer Michael Nyman was a signatory to the letter, when in fact it was PMK•BNC chairman and CEO Michael Nyman."

He lives in North London.

== Honours ==
Nyman was appointed Commander of the Order of the British Empire (CBE) in the 2008 Birthday Honours.

Nyman was awarded an honorary doctorate (DLitt) from the University of Warwick on 30 January 2007. At the degree ceremony, the University of Warwick Brass Society and Chamber Choir, conducted by Paul McGrath, premiered a specially composed procession and recession fanfare by Nyman.

In 2015, he was awarded the Golden Duke for Lifetime Achievement, the special award of the 6th Odesa International Film Festival.

In 2025, he received a Lifetime Achievement from the World Soundtrack Academy.

== Works ==
Besides his compositions Nyman is also a filmmaker, having made over 80 films, his first shot in 1968.

- 1963 – Introduction and Allegro Concertato for Wind Quartet (lost)
- 1963 – Divertimento for Flute, Oboe and Clarinet
- 1965 – Canzona for Flute
- 1974 – Bell Set No. 1 (multiple metal percussion)
- 1976 – Keep It Up Downstairs (film music)
- 1976 – 1–100 (4–6 pianos)
- 1976 – (First) Waltz in D (variable)
- 1976 – (Second) Waltz in F (variable)
- 1977 – In Re Don Giovanni (for the Michael Nyman Band) – arranged for string quartet (1991), string quintet (1997), and orchestra (2010)
- 1977 – A Walk Through H (film music)
- 1978 – The Otherwise Very Beautiful Blue Danube Waltz (multiple pianos)
- 1978 – Vertical Features Remake (film music)
- 1979 – 'The Masterwork' Award Winning Fish-Knife (for the Michael Nyman Band)
- 1979 – Four Ostinatos (bass clarinet)
- 1979 – Masterwork Samples (for the Michael Nyman Band)
- 1980 – A Neat Slice of Time (choir)
- 1980 – A Neat Slice of Saraband (clarinet, trombone, piano and cello)
- 1985 – The Falls (film music for the Michael Nyman Band)
- 1980 – Act of God (film music)
- 1981 – Think Slow, Act Fast (for Hoketus) – reworked into soundtrack for A Sixth Part of the World in 2010
- 1981 – Five Orchestral Pieces for Opus Tree (band) (based on Anton Webern's Five Pieces for Orchestra, Op. 10)
- 1981 – M-Work (for the Michael Nyman Band)
- 1981 – Two Violins (two amplified violins)
- 1982 – Four Saxes (Real Slow Drag) (saxophone quartet)
- 1982 – A Handsom, Smooth, Sweet, Smart, Clear Stroke: Or Else Play Not At All (orchestra)
- 1982 – The Draughtsman's Contract (film music for the Michael Nyman Band)
- 1983 – Ballet Mécanique (ensemble)
- 1983 – Time's Up (Gamelan ensemble)
- 1983 – I'll Stake My Cremona to a Jew's Trump (electric violin and viola, both players also simultaneously singing)
- 1983 – Love is Certainly, at Least Alphabetically Speaking (soprano and ensemble)
- 1983 – Ballet Mécanique (film music for ensemble)
- 1983 – Nelly's Version (film music)
- 1983 – Frozen Music (for the Michael Nyman Band)
- 1984 – The Abbess of Andouillets (choir and percussion)
- 1984 – Bird Work (for the Michael Nyman Band)
- 1984 – The Cold Room (film music for chamber orchestra)
- 1985 – Nose-List Song (soprano and orchestra) [this and the above three works are from an unfinished opera setting of Laurence Sterne's The Life and Opinions of Tristram Shandy, Gentleman, which Nyman has repeatedly cited as his all-time favourite book]
- 1985 – Childs Play (2 violins and harpsichord or ensemble)
- 1985 – String Quartet No. 1
- 1985 – A Zed and Two Noughts (film music for ensemble)
- 1985 – Memorial (orchestra)
- 1985 – Zoo Caprices (violin)
- 1986 – Basic Black (ballet for orchestra, reduced for piano duet as Taking a Line for a Second Walk in 1994)
- 1986 – The Man Who Mistook His Wife for a Hat (opera; libretto by Christopher Rawlence; adapted from the Oliver Sacks case study by Nyman, Rawlence, and Michael Morris)
- 1986 – And Do They Do (for the Michael Nyman Band)
- 1986 – The Disputation (film music)
- 1987 – Touch the Earth (two sopranos, violin, and viola)
- 1987 – Vital Statistics (opera; libretto by Victoria Hardie) – withdrawn and revised into Facing Goya in 2000
- 1988 – Orpheus' Daughter (opera; libretto by Gerrit Timmers) – withdrawn
- 1988 – String Quartet No. 2
- 1988 – Drowning by Numbers (film music for the Michael Nyman Band)
- 1989 – Out of the Ruins (choir)
- 1989 – La Traversée de Paris (for the Michael Nyman Band, soprano, and choir)
- 1989 – The Fall of Icarus (for the Michael Nyman Band) – reworked into The Commissar Vanishes in 1999
- 1989 – L'Orgie Parisienne (soprano or mezzo-soprano and ensemble) – originally part of La Traversée de Paris
- 1989 – La Sept (for the Michael Nyman Band)
- 1989 – Death in the Seine (film music)
- 1989 – The Cook, the Thief, His Wife & Her Lover (film music for the Michael Nyman Band)
- 1990 – Shaping the Curve (soprano saxophone, string quartet or piano)
- 1990 – Six Celan Songs (contralto and orchestra)
- 1990 – Polish Love Song (soprano and piano or two clarinets, viola, cello and bass)
- 1990 – String Quartet No. 3
- 1990 – Men of Steel (TV episode music)
- 1991 – Where the Bee Dances (soprano saxophone and orchestra)
- 1991 – Fluegelhorn and Piano
- 1991 – Prospero's Books (film music for the Michael Nyman Band), Concert Suite for chamber orchestra arranged in 1994
- 1991 – Letters, Riddles and Writs (3 voices and the Michael Nyman Band)
- 1991 – Masque Arias (brass quintet)
- 1991 – The Final Score (film music for the Michael Nyman Band)
- 1991 – I am an Unusual Thing (contralto and the Michael Nyman Band or piano)
- 1992 – Time Will Pronounce (violin, cello, and piano)
- 1992 – For John Cage (brass ensemble)
- 1992 – Self-Laudatory Hymn of Inanna and Her Omnipotence (alto and string orchestra or countertenor and viol consort)
- 1992 – The Convertibility of Lute Strings (solo harpsichord)
- 1992 – Anne de Lucy Songs (soprano and piano)
- 1992 – Le Mari de la Coiffeuse (film music)
- 1992 – The Upside-Down Violin (orchestra/ensemble)
- 1992 – Mozart on Mortality (soprano and 6 players)
- 1992 – The Piano (film music for orchestra), arranged for concert suites in 2003 and 2005
- 1992 – Ariel Songs (soprano and piano, also for voice and string quartet, or saxophone and piano)
- 1993 – MGV: Musique à grande vitesse (band and orchestra)
- 1993 – The Piano Concerto (piano and orchestra)
- 1993 – Noises, Sounds & Sweet Airs (1993; opera-ballet setting William Shakespeare's The Tempest)
- 1993 – Yamamoto Perpetuo (violin solo)
- 1993 – Songs for Tony (saxophone quartet)
- 1993 – On the Fiddle (violin or cello, and piano or strings)
- 1994 – To Morrow (soprano or soprano saxophone, organ)
- 1994 – 3 Quartets (ensemble)
- 1994 – Concerto for Trombone (trombone, orchestra, and steel filing cabinets)
- 1994 – A La Folie (film music for the Michael Nyman Band)
- 1994 – Carrington (for the Michael Nyman Band)
- 1994 – Three Quartets (for the Michael Nyman Band)
- 1995 – String Quartet No. 4
- 1995 – Tango for Tim (In memoriam Tim Suster) (harpsichord)
- 1995 – The Waltz Song (unison voices)
- 1995 – Viola and Piano
- 1995 – Grounded (mezzo-soprano, saxophones, violin, piano)
- 1995 – HRT [High Rise Terminal] (chamber ensemble)
- 1995 – Concerto for Harpsichord and Strings
- 1995 – Double Concerto for Saxophone and Cello (saxophone, cello, and orchestra)
- 1995 – The Diary of Anne Frank (film music for the Michael Nyman Band, also orchestral suite)
- 1996 – After Extra Time (ensemble)
- 1996 – Enemy Zero (game music for soprano and orchestra)
- 1996 – The Ogre (film music for the Michael Nyman Band)
- 1996 – Elisabeth Gets Her Way (harpsichord)
- 1996 – Knights at School (brass ensemble)
- 1997 – Enemy Zero – Original Soundtrack
- 1997 – Strong on Oaks, Strong on the Causes of Oaks (orchestra)
- 1997 – Gattaca, orchestral suite in 2001/2003
- 1997 – Titch (worked on the main opening/closing piano theme).
- 1998 – Cycle of Disquietude (Coisas, Vozes, Lettras) (soprano, mezzo-soprano, and band)
- 1998 – Orfeu (band)
- 1998 – De Granada A La Luna (band)
- 1999 – The End of the Affair (film music, also orchestral suite)
- 1999 – Wonderland (film music for the Michael Nyman Band)
- 1999 – Balancing the Books (choir)
- 1999 – Strange Attractors (piano quintet) -->
- 2000 – Facing Goya (opera; libretto by Victoria Hardie)
- 2000 – Act Without Words (film music)
- 2000 – The Claim (film music for the Michael Nyman Band)
- 2001 – a dance he little thinks of (orchestra)
- 2001 – Fourths, Mostly (organ)
- 2001 – Free for All (brass ensemble)
- 2001 – Mosè (choir and string quartet)
- 2001 – Ballad of Kastriot Rexhepi (soprano and string quartet or string orchestra)
- 2002 – 24 heures de la vie d'une femme (film music for orchestra)
- 2002 – Beckham Crosses, Nyman Scores (string quartet and tape), derive Exit, No Exit for bass clarinet and string quartet in 2005
- 2002 – Dance of the Engines (orchestra)
- 2002 – Mapping (video art music for string quartet)
- 2002 – Sangam: The Meeting Point (mandolin and the Michael Nyman Band)
- 2002 – The Actors (film music for the Michael Nyman Band)
- 2002 – Yellow Beach (piano trio)
- 2002 – Zeit und Ziel 1814–2002 (for the Michael Nyman Band)
- 2003 – Violin Concerto (violin and orchestra)
- 2003 – Man and Boy: Dada (opera; libretto by Michael Hastings)
- 2003 – A Child's View of Colour (choir and strings)
- 2003 – Manhatta (for the Michael Nyman Band or bass clarinet or soprano and bass clarinet)
- 2004 – 24 Hour Sax Quartet
- 2004 - 9 Songs (songs; Nadia and Debbie)
- 2004 – Flicker (electronic guitar and electronics)
- 2004 – The Libertine (film music for orchestra)
- 2004 – Photography of Chance (piano trio)
- 2005 – Love Counts (opera; libretto by Michael Hastings)
- 2005 – Melody Waves (Chinese orchestra)
- 2005 – Revisiting the Don (Chinese flute and the Michael Nyman Band)
- 2006 – gdm for Marimba and Orchestra (concerto)
- 2006 – Acts of Beauty (song cycle for soprano and 6 players)
- 2006 – For Kiyan Prince (choir)
- 2006 – I was a Total Virgin (orchestra)
- 2006 – That's the Lover (voice and 5 players)
- 2007 – A Handshake in the Dark (choral piece with orchestra; text by Jamal Jumá [world premiere 8 March 2007, Barbican, London, performed by the BBC Symphony Chorus and Orchestra, John Storgards conducting])
- 2007 – Interlude in C (expansion of a theme from The Libertine for Accent07 touring ensemble)
- 2007 – Warwick Fanfare (Parts 1 & 2) (procession and recession fanfares used for graduation ceremonies at the University of Warwick)
- 2007 – 50,000 pairs of feet can't be wrong. (for the Michael Nyman Band)
- 2007 – A New Pavan For These Sad, Distracted Times (cello concerto)
- 2007 – I Sonetti Lussuriosi (soprano and ensemble or orchestra)
- 2007 – Piano Concerto No. 2
- 2007 – Violin Concerto No. 2
- 2007 – Taking it as Read (violin and piano)
- 2008 – Yamamoto Perpetuo for Solo Flute (arranged by Andy Findon)
- 2008 – Something Connected with Energy (ensemble) – reworked into soundtrack for The Eleventh Year in 2010
- 2008 – For Ennio (cello and strings)
- 2009 – Sparkie: Cage and Beyond (opera with Carsten Nicolai)
- 2009 – The Musicologist Scores (for the Michael Nyman Band)
- 2009 – Banjo & Matilda (for the Michael Nyman Band)
- 2009 – Kino (3 accordions and the Michael Nyman Band)
- 2009 – Ombra mai fu (countertenor and orchestra)
- 2009 – Secrets, Accusations and Charges (for the Michael Nyman Band)
- 2009 – Underneath the Hessian Bags (for the Michael Nyman Band)
- 2010 – 2Graves
- 2010 – Body Parts Songs (song cycle)
- 2010 – Concerto for Flute and Strings
- 2010 – Milton Songs (voice and the Michael Nyman Band)
- 2010 – Poczatek (piano trio)fPolish Love Son
- 2011 – Prologue to Dido and Aeneas by Henry Purcell (opera, libretto by Vera Pavlova)
- 2011 – Battleship Potemkin (film music for the Michael Nyman Band)
- 2011 – Doing the Rounds (orchestra and choir)
- 2011 – On Languard Point (soprano and the Michael Nyman Band)
- 2011 – Let's not make a song and dance out of it (String Quartet No. 5)
- 2012 – Through the Only Window (piano quintet)
- 2012 – Devoción (orchestra)
- 2013 – Trumpet & String Quartet
- 2013 – Goldberg Shuffle (piano)
- 2013 – Symphony No. 2
- 2013 – Symphony No. 5
- 2013 – Symphony No. 6
- 2013 – Water Dances (Symphony No. 8)
- 2014 – Symphony of sexual songs (Symphony No. 3)
- 2014 – War Work: Eight Songs with Film (song cycle commissioned to commemorate the 100th anniversary of the First World War)
- 2014 – Hillsborough Memorial (Symphony No. 11)
- 2014 – Symphony No. 12
- 2014 – Two Sonnets for Sor Juana Inés de la Cruz (choir or voice)
- 2015 – Chromattic (saxophone, accordion, marimba and double bass)
- 2015 – Empresa Cines Merida (piano quintet)
- 2015 – Symphony No. 4
- 2016 – As You Watch The Athletes Score (for the Michael Nyman Band)
- 2016 – No Time In Eternity (countertenor and viol consort)
- 2019 – Flute Concerto No. 2 (flute and strings)
- 2019 – Neat Slice of Tango (piano)
- 2019 – When Ingrid Met Capa (string quartet)

== Collaborations ==
In addition to his composing and filmmaking activities, Nyman has a full international touring schedule with the Michael Nyman Band as well as a series of unique one-off performances with a variety of collaborators. They include musicians from outside the western/classical/experimental traditions such as the Orquesta Andalusí de Tetuan, Rajan and Sajan Misra, U. Shrinivas, Estrella Morente, Seijin Noborakawa, Ute Lemper, Evan Parker, Peter Brotzmann, Paolo Fresu, Mike Giles, The Flying Lizards, Dagmar Krause, Sting, Damon Albarn, David McAlmont and Alva Noto.

== Select discography ==
=== Studio albums ===
- Decay Music (Obscure, 1976)
- Michael Nyman (Piano, 1981)
- The Draughtsman's Contract (Charisma, 1982)
- The Kiss and Other Movements (Editions EG, 1985)
- A Zed & Two Noughts (That's Entertainment, 1985)
- The Man Who Mistook His Wife for a Hat (CBS, 1987)
- Drowning by Numbers (Venture, 1988)
- La Traversée de Paris (Criterion, 1989)
- The Cook, the Thief, His Wife & Her Lover (Venture, 1989)
- String Quartets 1–3 (Argo, 1991)
- Prospero's Books (Decca, 1991)
- The Michael Nyman Songbook (Decca, 1992)
- Time Will Pronounce (Argo, 1993)
- The Piano (Venture, 1993)
- The Piano Concerto/MGV (Argo, 1994)
- Noises, Sounds & Sweet Airs (Argo, 1995)
- After Extra Time (Venture, 1996)
- Concertos (EMI, 1997)
- The Suit and the Photograph (EMI, 1998)
- Wonderland (Virgin Venture, 1999)
- Facing Goya (Warner, 2002)
- Sangam: Michael Nyman Meets Indian Masters (Warner, 2003)
- Man and Boy: Dada (MN, 2005)
- Acts of Beauty/Exit no Exit (MN, 2006)
- Love Counts (MN, 2007)
- 8 Lust Songs: I Sonetti Lussuriosi (MN, 2008)

== See also ==
- List of ambient music artists
