= A Zed & Two Noughts =

1985 film by Peter Greenaway

- Theatrical release poster
- Directed by: Peter Greenaway
- Written by: Peter Greenaway
- Produced by: Kees Kasander; Peter Sainsbury
- Starring: Andréa Ferréol; Brian Deacon; Eric Deacon; Frances Barber; Joss Ackland
- Cinematography: Sacha Vierny
- Music by: Michael Nyman
- Production company: Channel Four Films
- Distributed by: Artificial Eye
- Release date: 4 October 1985
- Running time: 115 minutes
- Countries: United Kingdom; Netherlands
- Language: English
- Budget: £635,000

A Zed & Two Noughts is a 1985 film written and directed by Peter Greenaway. This film was Greenaway's first collaboration with cinematographer Sacha Vierny, who went on to shoot virtually all of Greenaway's work in the 1980s and 1990s, until Vierny's death. Greenaway referred to Vierny as his "most important collaborator". The film deals with twin zoologists who, after losing both their wives in a car accident, develop an obsession with animal decomposition.

== Plot ==
Twin zoologists, Oswald and Oliver Deuce (Brian Deacon and Eric Deacon), are at work studying the behaviour of animals at a zoo when both their wives are killed in a car crash involving a large swan which crashes through the car windscreen. The woman who was driving the car, Alba Bewick (Andréa Ferréol), is not killed, but has a leg amputated.

Venus de Milo (Frances Barber), a prostitute and storyteller who plies her trade at the zoo, attempts to forge a relationship with the twins, ostensibly to help them recover from their loss. Meanwhile, Oswald and Oliver gradually become obsessed with images of growth and decay, watching videos on the origins of life and creating time-lapse video of decomposing life forms. They begin this latter task with a green apple, bitten into and rotting before their camera lens.

The twins' descent sees them become romantically involved with Alba, and increasingly attached to one another. Venus de Milo remains involved with them enough to observe their obsessions grow: they take to video-taping the decomposition of prawns, and they take a personal interest in Alba's childhood, going so far as to ask her to show them a field seen in a photograph on her bedside table. They become obsessed with snails, and they take advantage of their contacts at the zoo to create decomposition videos of more and more complex animals, moving gradually up the food chain. Excerpts from Sir David Attenborough's TV series Life on Earth, including his narration, are featured in the film.

Alba becomes a subject for the experiments of her surgeon, who eventually amputates her other leg, claiming it is putting stress on her spine. His true motive is to fashion Alba into a subject of his recreations of Johannes Vermeer paintings; Venus de Milo participates in this process, as well.

Ultimately, the Deuce brothers' obsession with decay leads them to the top of the food chain, and to a complex life-and-death negotiation with Alba herself. The brothers' project seems the only possible emotional investment for either of them, so Alba offers herself as the final specimen to be photographed in its decay. However her family intervenes before the brothers can claim her, so they are forced to find another way to create their final time-lapse video. They do so by returning to the field of Alba's childhood and setting up the necessary equipment to facilitate and capture their own decomposition. A huge infestation of snails covers the equipment and bodies, however, and finally shorts out the electrical system, halting their grand project.

== Cast ==
- Andrea Ferreol as Alba Bewick
- Brian Deacon as Oswald Deuce
- Eric Deacon as Oliver Deuce
- Frances Barber as Venus de Milo
- Joss Ackland as Van Hoyten
- Jim Davidson as Joshua Plate
- Agnes Brulet as Beta Bewick
- Guusje Van Tilborgh as Caterina Bolnes
- Gerard Thoolen as Van Meegeren
- Ken Campbell as Stephen Pipe
- Wolf Kahler as Felipe Arc-en-Ciel
- Geoffrey Palmer as Fallast
- David Attenborough as Narrator (archive footage)

== Reception ==
The film received generally positive reviews, holding a 75% on aggregator Rotten Tomatoes from 20 reviews. Philip French of The Observer wrote, "The energy is immense, the appearance of the film consistently sleek and visually exciting." Jonathan Rosenbaum considers it to be "the boldest and arguably the best of Peter Greenaway's fiction features". Not all reviews were positive, however. Vincent Canby of The New York Times called it "pretentious, humorless and, worst of all, more boring than a retrospective devoted to television weather forecasts delivered over a 30-year period at 11 P.M., Eastern standard time."

Philip Hoffman's 1986 documentary film ?O, Zoo!: The Making of a Fiction Film was based in part around the making of A Zed & Two Noughts.

== Soundtrack ==
A Zed & Two Noughts
- Original UK cover

Soundtrack album by Michael Nyman
- Released: 1985
- Genres: Contemporary classical music, film scores, minimalism
- Length: 41:25
- Labels: TER (UK); Virgin Venture, Caroline (US)
- Producer: David Cunningham

Michael Nyman chronology
The Kiss and Other Movements (1985)	A Zed & Two Noughts (1985)	And Do They Do/Zoo Caprices (1986)

A Zed And Two Noughts

Elements of Michael Nyman's score invoke the "Dies Irae" section from Heinrich Ignaz Franz Biber's Requiem ex F con terza minore. The "Angelfish Decay"/"Swan Rot"/"L'Escargot" theme was originally written for Childs Play, a dance work commissioned by Lucinda Childs. Performance of the soundtrack is credited to Nyman, Alexander Balanescu, Elisabeth Perry, Sarah Leonard and "The Zoo Orchestra". While the score is in the Michael Nyman Band's repertoire, particularly "Time Lapse" and "Prawn Watching", they do not perform on the soundtrack. Musicians credited on the film's closing credits are (in alphabetical order) Arno Bons, Gerard Bouwhuis, Bas Dekker, Pieter Gouderjaan, Rob Hageman, John Helstone, Jan Jansen, Sofia Kiss, Henk Leether, Beverly Lund, Gerrit Oloeman, Jelle Schouten, Jorn Shroeder, Peter Stan, Win Steinman, Leo Van Oostron, Marien Van Staalen, Adri Van Velson, Peter Veenhuizen, Lene Te Voortwis, Frans Vreugdenhil, and Gerbrand Westveen.

=== Track listing ===
1. "Angelfish Decay"
2. "Car Crash"
3. "Time Lapse"
4. "Prawn Watching"
5. "Bisocosis Populi"
6. "Swan Rot"
7. "Delft Waltz"
8. "Up for Crabs"
9. "Vermeer's Wife"
10. "Venus de Milo"
11. "Lady in the Red Hat"
12. "L'Escargot"
- Produced by David Cunningham
- Recorded at VARA Studio, Berry Street Studio and Olympic Studios
- Mixed at Olympic Studios
- Digital editing at Finesplice
- Mastered by Tim Young and Michael J. Dutton

The album was issued on compact disc in the United States on 4 June 1991, with a new cover featuring Ferreol in-between the Deacons in bed, and the title spelled A Zed And Two Noughts. The original LP cover showed a zebra in a cage, as does the UK CD. A digitally remastered edition was released in the United States with the 1991 cover on 29 March 2004.
