= The Composer's Cut Series Vol. II: Nyman/Greenaway Revisited =

- photograph by Michael Nyman design by Russell Mills and Michael Webster

Studio album by Michael Nyman
- Released: April 17, 2006 (UK); September 29, 2008 (United States)
- Recorded: April 2005, Abbey Road Studios; 1992, Abbey Road Studios (Track 10)
- Genre: Contemporary classical music, Minimalist music, Film score
- Length: 61:31
- Label: MN Records
- Producer: Michael Nyman

Michael Nyman chronology
The Composer's Cut Series Vol. I: The Draughtsman's Contract (2006)	The Composer's Cut Series Vol. II: Nyman/Greenaway Revisited (2006)	The Composer's Cut Series Vol. III: The Piano (2006)

The Composer's Cut Series Vol. II: Nyman/Greenaway Revisited is the second in a series of albums, all released on the same day, by Michael Nyman to feature concert versions of film scores, in this case, films of Peter Greenaway, and his 52nd release overall. The album is similar to The Essential Michael Nyman Band, although a number of tracks are on only one album or the other. In spite of being recorded in 1992, with the same lineup, Memorial is not the same performance as the one that appears on The Essential Michael Nyman Band or After Extra Time, which was recorded in Tokyo. This performance was recorded in London and is slightly less aggressively performed.

== Track listing ==
1. An eye for optical theory (The Draughtsman's Contract)
2. Queen of the night (The Draughtsman's Contract)
3. Chasing sheep is best left to shepherds (The Draughtsman's Contract)
4. Car crash (A Zed And Two Noughts)
5. Time lapse (A Zed And Two Noughts)
6. Vermeer's Wife (A Zed And Two Noughts)
7. Trysting fields/Sheep 'n' tides (Drowning by Numbers)
8. Wheelbarrow walk (Drowning by Numbers)
9. Fish beach (Drowning by Numbers)
10. Memorial (The Cook, The Thief, His Wife and Her Lover)
11. Come unto these yellow sands (Prospero's Books)
12. Prospero's curse (Prospero's Books)
13. Miranda (Prospero's Books)

== Personnel ==
The Michael Nyman Band

- Michael Nyman, piano
- Gabrielle Lester, 1st violin
- Cathy Thompson, 2nd violin
- Catherine Musker, viola
- Anthony Hinnigan, cello
- David Roach, soprano and alto saxophone
- Simon Haram, soprano and alto saxophone
- Andy Findon, baritone saxophone, flute, piccolo
- Martin Elliott, bass guitar
- Dave Lee, horn
- Steve Sidwell, trumpet
- Nigel Gomme, trumpet
- Nigel Barr, bass trombone, tuba
- Ian Humphries, violin
- Beverley Davison, violin

Memorial

- Sarah Leonard, soprano
- Alexander Balanescu, violin
- Clare Conners, violin
- Catherine Musker, viola
- Anthony Hinnigan, cello
- Martin Elliott, bass guitar
- John Harle, alto saxophone
- David Roach, alto saxophone
- Andy Findon, baritone saxophone
- Steve Sidwell, trumpet
- Marjorie Dunn, horn
- Nigel Barr, bass trombone
- Music composed, conducted and produced by Michael Nyman
- Recorded at Abbey Road Studios, April 2005, by Austing Ince
- except track 10 recorded at Abbey Road Studios, 1992 by Michael Dutton
- All tracks edited and mixed at Olympic Studios, August 2005, by Austin Ince
- Mastered by Peter Mew at Abbey Road Studios, August 2005
- Published by Chester Music Ltd./Michael Nyman Ltd.
- Design by Russell Mills (shed)
- Co-design by Michael Webster (storm)
- Photography by Michael Nyman
