= The Piano Concerto/MGV =

- Art: Russell Warren-Fischer from a photograph courtesy of French Railways

Studio album by Michael Nyman
- Released: March 28, 1994 (UK); April 12, 1994 (United States)
- Recorded: January 6–7, 1994, Philharmonic Hall, Liverpool (The Piano Concerto); December 8 & 10, 1993, Air Lyndhurst and Henry Wood Hall (MGV)
- Genre: Contemporary classical, minimal
- Length: 59:03
- Label: Argo
- Producer: Andrew Cornall

Michael Nyman chronology
Michael Nyman for Yohji Yamamoto (1993)	The Piano Concerto/MGV (1994)	À la folie (1994)

2008 Reissue Cover
- Art by Michael Nyman, Russell Mills, Michael Storm-Webster

Professional ratings
Review scores
Source	Rating
The Buffalo News	3.5/4 stars
The Flying Inkpot	favorable

The Piano Concerto/MGV is the 23rd album by Michael Nyman, released in 1994. It contains two compositions, The Piano Concerto and MGV. The first is performed by Kathryn Stott and the Royal Liverpool Philharmonic Orchestra conducted by Michael Nyman, and the second is performed by the Michael Nyman Band and Orchestra with Michael Nyman at the piano.

The album was released on Argo Records, and went out of print when the label folded. The original recording was reissued with new cover artwork by MN Records, Nyman's own label, on December 1, 2008

== The Piano Concerto ==
The Piano Concerto is a piano concerto based on the music Nyman wrote for The Piano organized into four phases (one movement). The saxophone is omitted ("Here to There" is given to the piano soloist) and the piano is accompanied by a traditional orchestra. The work is Nyman's second concerto, having previously written a saxophone concerto, Where the Bee Dances, for John Harle.

The Piano Concerto was first premiered 26 September 1993 at the Festival de Lille, which was also the debut of MGV. In his liner notes. Nyman cites the definite article as significant, and states the order of composition of the work: Autumn 1991, piano music for Holly Hunter to play in the film; Summer 1992, orchestral score for the completed film; concerto commissioned by Festival de Lille in Spring 1993. Jean-Claude Casadesus conducted the premiere of both works. Stott was the premiere soloist.

Nyman states that the principal goals of this "reconsideration" threefold: "to create a more coherent structure" for the musical material, elaborates upon the texture for full orchestra (the original was for saxophone and string orchestra), and to make the piano part more virtuoso.

The first phase, in A minor, is derived from the Scottish folk song, "Bonny Winter's noo awa"; the second phase is original and chromatic; the third is in G/D major and based on "Flowers of the Forest" (much faster and cut apart) and "Bonnie Jean" "massively slowed down" on cellos, trumpet, and divisi violins, and a harmonic phrase derived from material in the first phase, followed by reprises of "Bonny Winter's noo awa" and "Flowers of the Forest."

This recording of The Piano Concerto runs 32:28.

The Piano Concerto has been rerecorded, first in 1996 by Peter Lawson with the Royal Philharmonic Orchestra conducted by Jonathan Carney, former violinist and violist of the Michael Nyman Band, and again in 1997, by John Lenehan (who had performed on The Essential Michael Nyman Band in 1992) with the Ulster Orchestra conducted by Takuo Yuasa, and released on Naxos Records with Where the Bee Dances performed by Simon Haram, a relative Michael Nyman Band newcomer at the time who is, as of 2008, still a regular member. This latter version is slightly faster and clocks in two minutes shorter, and features a very strong and precise brass section.

== MGV: Musique à Grand Vitesse ==
This recording of MGV runs 26:30. It is the only commercial recording to date. "5th Region" appears on the promotional compilation Michael Nyman.

== Track listing ==
1. The Beach 11:48
2. The Woods 6:25
3. The Hut 9:06
4. The Release 5:09
5. 1st Region 4:56
6. 2nd Region 4:06
7. 3rd Region 8:18
8. 4th Region 3:48
9. 5th Region 5:22

== Personnel ==
=== Musicians ===
==== The Piano Concerto ====
- Kathryn Stott, solo piano
- Royal Liverpool Philharmonic Orchestra
- Michael Nyman, conductor

==== MGV ====
The Michael Nyman Band & Orchestra

Michael Nyman Band

- Michael Nyman, piano
- Alexander Balanescu, violin
- Clare Connors, violin
- Anthony Hinnigan, cello
- John Harle, soprano saxophone
- David Roach, soprano/alto saxophone
- Andrew Findon, baritone saxophone/piccolo
- Nigel Barr, bass trombone
- Martin Elliott, bass guitar
- Michael Nyman, conductor

=== Crew ===
- Producer: Andrew Cornall
- Engineer (The Piano Concerto): Neil Hutchinson
- Engineer (MGV): Michael J. Dutton
- Tape editor: Tim Bull
- MGV mixed at Kitsch Studios, Brussels
- Publisher: Michael Nyman Ltd/Chester Music Ltd
- Design: Russell Warren-Fischer
- Art direction: David Smart
- Michael Nyman photograph: Nigel Parry
- Kathryn Stott photograph: Hanya Chlala
- Liner notes: Michael Nyman

This album is the earliest reference to a Michael Nyman Orchestra, though unlike the band, its members are not credited.

== Short Cuts: Breaking the Sound Barrier ==
The album has been issued as a double album with Short Cuts: Breaking the Sound Barrier, a sampler compilation of music from other Argo Records albums by Graham Fitkin (2 tracks), Gavin Bryars, Michael Torke, Chris Fitkin, Michael Nyman (2 tracks), Henryk Górecki, Aaron Jay Kernis, Kevin Volans, Stanley Myers, David Byrne, Michael Gordon, Robert Moran, Mark Anthony Turnage, Richard Harris, and Paul Schoenfield. The booklet is double sized rather than having a separate booklet, and the track listing is on the inner liner tray. The album is easier to find in the single version. Short Cuts is produced by Andrew Cornall, with art direction by David Smart and design by Russell Warren-Fischer, consisting of 1/4 page grey squares behind the work descriptions. Several sales sites have listed Short Cuts sampler separately, but none have yet shown a separate album cover.
