= La Sept (album) =

Soundtrack album by Michael Nyman
- Released: December 1989
- Genre: Contemporary classical, minimalism
- Length: 21:31

Michael Nyman chronology
Out of the Ruins (1989)	La Sept (1989)	String Quartets 1-3 (1991)

La Sept is a 1989 promotional album of music for the French TV network La Sept written by Michael Nyman and performed by the Michael Nyman Band. It is Nyman's fourteenth release. Gabrielle Lester makes her debut with the band on this album. After a 13-year hiatus (at least from recording) with the band, she would replace the departing Alexander Balanescu as concertmaster for The Michael Nyman Band during the recording of Facing Goya, and, as of 2008, remains in that position. Musical passages created for La Sept were later re-used for the piece The Final Score which is featured in the album After Extra Time.

== Track listing ==
1. Ouverture (1:04)
2. L'Après-Midi (0:47)
3. Le Soir (0:48)
4. La Nuit (0:48)
  La Sept, Suite
5. Untitled (1:24)
6. Untitled (0:54)
7. Untitled (1:21)
8. Untitled (2:48)
9. Untitled (1:29)
10. Untitled (1:25)
11. Untitled (1:30)
12. Untitled (2:14)
13. Untitled (1:31)
14. Untitled (0:21)
15. Untitled (2:55)

== Personnel ==
- Michael Nyman, composer, piano, conductor
- Elisabeth Perry, Fenella Barton, Gabrielle Lester, Iris Juda, Jackie Shave, Jonathan Rees, Lyn Fletcher, Mayumi Seiler, Mike McMeneny*, Richard Ehrlich, violin
- Kate Musker, Roger Tapping, viola
- Jane Salmen, Tim Hugh, Tony Hinnigan, cello
- Lynda Herighten, double bass
- Martin Elliott, bass guitar
- David Rix, clarinet
- John Harle, soprano saxophone
- David Roach, alto saxophone
- Andrew Findon, Tenor, baritone saxophone
- David Stuart, trombone
- Richard Watkins, horn
- Sylvie Caspar – voice
- Producer – David Cunningham, Philippe Truffaut
- Engineer – Michael Dutton*
- Mixed by, edited by – Jean-Philippe Goude
