= 8 Lust Songs: I Sonetti Lussuriosi =

- art by Giulio Romano design by Russell Mills and Michael Webster

Studio album by Michael Nyman
- Released: 29 July 2008
- Recorded: 10 & 11 December 2007, Olympic Studio 1, London
- Genre: art song, contemporary classical, minimalism
- Length: 45:29
- Language: Italian
- Label: MN Records
- Producer: Michael Nyman

Michael Nyman chronology
Mozart 252 (2008)	8 Lust Songs: I Sonetti Lussuriosi (2008)	The Glare (2009)

Professional ratings
Review scores
Source	Rating
AllMusic	5/5 stars
BBC	4/5 stars
The Buffalo News	2.5/5 stars
The Independent	favorable

8 Lust Songs: I Sonetti Lussuriosi is a setting by Michael Nyman of 8 pieces of a collection of erotic poetry from Pietro Aretino's I Sonetti Lussuriosi. The songs depict a man and woman's sexual desires for one another in varying contexts. Marie Angel premiered the piece, voicing both the male and female characters, including a voyeuristic old woman, with the Orchestra di Santa Cecilia, conducted by the composer, on 4 October 2007 at the Arsenale in Venice, Italy, on a commission from Venice Biennale. A studio recording with the Michael Nyman Band was released on compact disc 29 July 2008. It is Nyman's 59th album, and the twelfth on his own label.

In a concert on 8 May 2008, the printed programs for a performance of the work at Cadogan Hall were withdrawn on the grounds that they contained obscene content. The U.S. release of the album has a very large Parental Advisory Explicit Content sticker directly on the jewel case, an extreme rarity in classical music (shared with John Moran's The Manson Family, which was quickly withdrawn and became a collectible).

== Track listing ==
1. Questo cazzo voglio io
2. Fottiamoci anima mia
3. Io 'l voglio in cul tu mi perdonerai
4. Tu pur a gambe in collo in cul me l'hai
5. Dammi la lingua
6. E saria pur una coglioneria
7. Mettimi un dito in cul caro vecchione
8. Apri le coscie, accio ch'io veggia bene

== Personnel ==
- Gabrielle Lester, violin
- Catherine Thompson, violin
- Kate Musker, viola
- Tony Hinnigan, cello
- Martin Elliott, bass guitar
- David Roach, saxophone
- Simon Haram, saxophone
- Andrew Findon, saxophone
- Steve Sidwell, trumpet
- David Lee, horn
- Nigel Barr, bass trombone
- Michael Nyman, piano
- Marie Angel, soprano
