= After Extra Time (album) =

- art by Dave McKean photo by The Douglas Brothers

Studio album by Michael Nyman
- Released: May 20, 1996
- Recorded: 1996, Jet Recording Studio, Brussels (After Extra Time); 1991, Windmill Lane Recording Studio, Dublin (The Final Score); 1992, JVC Victor Studios, Tokyo (Memorial)
- Genre: Contemporary classical music, minimalist music, film music
- Length: 64:05
- Label: Virgin/Caroline
- Director: Michael Nyman
- Producer: Michael Nyman; Martin Elliott; David Roach

Michael Nyman chronology
The Diary of Anne Frank (1995)	After Extra Time (1996)	The Ogre (1996)

After Extra Time is a 1996 album by Michael Nyman with the Michael Nyman Band containing three tributes to Nyman's fandom of Association football: After Extra Time, the soundtrack to The Final Score, and Memorial. The latter is described as a remix, but is simply the 1992 recording from The Essential Michael Nyman Band. It was included in order to put it together with his two other football-inspired works (he has since written another: see Acts of Beauty • Exit no Exit). The album lists only three tracks, which has caused it to be erroneously reported that Memorial is track 3 and the others are all hidden tracks, but Memorial is track 26. Therefore, a track listing, as the individual portions of the pieces are not named, is not useful. The three pieces were recorded at separate times and thus have separate personnel lists.

== After Extra Time ==
Tracks 1–16 29:29
The title of the album is inspired by the way Nyman's wife's rare first name, Aet, often appears in football scores, signifying "after extra time". The piece was written in two layers, one in 1995, and one in 1996, which could be said to represent two teams. The piece is also the basis for another work, "HRT [High Rise Terminal]", which was included by Relâche on their album, Pick It Up in 1997.

=== Team A ===
- Andrew Findon, flute (doubling piccolo and baritone sax)
- John Harle, soprano (doubling alto) sax
- David Roach, alto (doubling tenor) sax
- Catherine Musker, viola
- Tony Hinnigan, cello

=== Team B ===
- Steve Sidwell, trumpet
- David Lee, horn
- Nigel Barr, bass trombone
- William Hawkes, violin
- Ann Morfee, violin

Michael Nyman at the piano and Martin Elliott on bass guitar play for both teams, while the violins sometimes carry contradictory harmonies.

Published by Northlight Ltd. c/o Associated Music Publishers / (BMI)

- producer: Michael Nyman, with Martin Elliott and David Roach
- engineer: Michael J. Dutton
- recorded, mixed and edited at Jet Recording Studio, Brussels

== The Final Score ==
Tracks 17–25 23:19
The Final Score is a 1991 film by Matthew Whiteman from 1991. This is the original soundtrack, part of which previously appeared on the collection Ai Confini/Interzone. The documentary is about Nyman's favorite team, Queens Park Rangers in the 1970s, when they were led by Stan Bowles. Tracks 17 and 25 are the main and end titles, and all of the music is built on variations of a four-note bass line.

=== Personnel ===
- Michael Nyman, piano/director
- Alexander Balanescu, violin
- Clare Connors, violin
- Ann Morfee, violin
- Catherine Musker, viola
- Tony Hinnigan, cello
- Justin Pearson, cello
- Martin Elliott, bass guitar
- John Harle, soprano & alto saxophone
- David Roach, soprano & alto saxophone
- Andrew Findon, baritone saxophone, flute & piccolo
- Steve Sidwell, trumpet
- Marjorie Dunn, horn
- Nigel Barr, bass trombone
- Published by Northlight Ltd. c/o Associated Music Publishers (BMI)
- producer: Michael Nyman
- engineer: Michael J. Dutton
- recorded, mixed and edited at Windmill Lane Recording Studio, Dublin

== Memorial (Remix) ==
Track 26 11:21
Nyman was in the process of composing Memorial when the Heysel Stadium disaster occurred in 1985, and the dirge-like work became to him immediately specifically about the 39 people killed in the accident. The album booklet contains a review of the original performance written by Waldemar Janusczak, which Nyman says "suggests the way in which the piece attempted in a small way to heal a wound Europe saw as a consequence of the harshness of rampant Thatcherism."

=== Personnel ===
- Michael Nyman, piano/director
- Sarah Leonard, soprano
- Alexander Balanescu, violin
- Clare Connors, violin
- Catherine Musker, viola
- Tony Hinnigan, cello
- Martin Elliott, bass guitar
- John Harle, alto saxophone
- David Roach, alto saxophone
- Andrew Findon, baritone saxophone
- Steve Sidwell, trumpet
- Marjorie Dunn, horn
- Nigel Barr, bass trombone, euphonium
- Published by Northlight Ltd c/o Associated Music Publishers (BMI)
- Courtesy of Decca Records Limited
- Michael Nyman, producer
- Michael J. Dutton, engineer
- Recorded at JVC Victor Studios, Tokyo
- Mixed and edited at Kitsch Studio, Brussels

== Album Personnel ==
- Design and illustration by Dave McKean
- Photographs of Michael Nyman by The Douglas Brothers
