= The Michael Nyman Songbook =

Songbook Songs to Texts by Celan, Shakespeare, Mozart, Rimbaud

Studio album by Michael Nyman and Ute Lemper
- Released: 10 March 1992
- Recorded: 1991
- Genre: Art song
- Length: 53:48
- Label: London, Argo
- Producer: David Cunningham

Michael Nyman chronology
Prospero's Books (1991)	Songbook; Songs to Texts by Celan, Shakespeare, Mozart, Rimbaud (1992)	The Hairdresser's Husband (1992)

Ute Lemper chronology
Ute Lemper Sings Kurt Weill (1990)	The Michael Nyman Songbook (1992)	Illusions (1993)

The Michael Nyman Songbook is a collection of art songs by Michael Nyman based on texts by Paul Celan, Wolfgang Amadeus Mozart, William Shakespeare and Arthur Rimbaud. It was recorded as an album with Ute Lemper in 1991, and again as a concert film in 1992, under the direction of Volker Schlöndorff, again with Ute Lemper, though many of the musicians had changed. The songs have been recorded by others and as instrumentals, and are published by Chester Music. The album has been issued by both London Records and Argo Records, though the covers are the same except for the logo.

== The Texts ==
The texts are the poetry of Paul Celan in German, from the collections, Mohn und Gedächtnis (1952), Von Schwelle zu Schwelle (1955), and Sprachgitter (1959), two letters and a 1787 Carnival riddle by Mozart in English for the segment by Jeremy Newsom of Artifax/BBC's Not Mozart titled Letters, Riddles and Writs, Ariel songs from The Tempest composed for Prospero's Books, and L'Orgie Parisienne, ou Paris se Repeuple by Rimbaud. All save the Mozart are performed in their original language.

== The Music ==
The songs are officially written for "low female voice". For Six Celan Songs, Nyman specifically wrote the pieces for Lemper. "Corona" and "Blume" "introduce an eight-bar chord sequence derived from Chopin's Mazurka in A minor, op. 17 no. 4 (the introduction to which was used by Gorecki in his Symphony No. 3)." It was composed between May and July 1990. Nyman's mother passed on 7 June, while he was writing "Blume", and he dedicated the cycle to her memory. "I Am an Unusual Thing" "is based entirely on extracts from two of Haydn quartets" and is from the opera, Letters, Riddles and Writs. L'Orgie parisienne is an extract from La Traversée de Paris.

== The album ==
Performed by Michael Nyman, Ute Lemper, and the Michael Nyman Band.

=== Track listing ===
Six Celan Songs (Paul Celan)

- 1. Chanson einer Dame in Schatten – 6.18
- 2. Es war Erde in ihnen – 4.12
- 3. Psalm – 3.35
- 4. Corona – 6.08
- 5. Nächtlich geschürzt – 6.27
- 6. Blume – 5.44

Ariel Songs (Shakespeare)

- 7. Come and go – 3.15
- 8. While you here do snoring lie – 1.06
- 9. Full fathom five – 4.18

10. I am an unusual thing (Mozart) – 5.18

L'Orgie Parisienne (Rimbaud)

- 11. Allez! on préviendra les reflux d'incendie – 3.18
- 12. Quand tes pieds ont dansé – 3.24

=== Credits ===
- Ute Lemper, vocals
- Alexander Bălănescu, violin
- Elisabeth Perry, violin
- Clare Connors, violin
- Michael McMenemy, violin
- Kate Musker, viola
- Tony Hinnigan, cello
- Ruth Phillips, cello
- Tim Amherst, double bass
- Martin Elliott, bass guitar
- David Rix, clarinet, bass clarinet
- John Harle, soprano, alto saxophone
- David Roach, soprano, alto, tenor saxophone
- Andrew Findon, baritone saxophone, flute
- Graham Ashton trumpet, flugelhorn
- Marjorie Dunn, horn
- Nigel Barr, bass trombone, euphonium
- Michael Nyman, piano
- David Cunnigham, producer
- Michael J. Dutton, engineer
- Chris Brown, assistant engineer
- Philippe Garcia, assistant engineer
- Ann Bradbeer, art director
- David Smart, art director
- Don Mousseau, executive producer; artist representative for Michael Nyman
- Recorded at Abbey Road Studios, London
- Mixed at Kitsch Studios, Brussels
- Mastering and editing at Transfermation and at Abbey Road

The album contains only one letter by Mozart, which is musically contiguous with the riddle after the song.

== The Film ==
The Michael Nyman Songbook
- Directed by: Volker Schlöndorff
- Produced by: Eberhard Junkersdorf
- Starring: Ute Lemper; Michael Nyman; John Harle; Nigel Barr
- Cinematography: Igor Luther
- Edited by: Gisela Grischow
- Music by: Michael Nyman
- Distributed by: London Records
- Release date: 30 May 1992
- Running time: 55 minutes
- Country: Germany
- Languages: German; English; French

The film was shot at the Musikhalle, Hamburg, 4 February 1992, before a live audience nearly filling the room to capacity. It includes scenes from such films as Alain Resnais's Night and Fog and Alexander Dovzhenko's Earth.

- Ute Lemper
- Michael Nyman conductor, piano
- Beverley Davidson, violin
- Madeleine Mitchell, violin
- Ann Morfee, violin
- Catherine Musker, viola
- Tony Hinnigan, cello
- Justin Pearson, cello
- Martin Elliott, bass guitar
- David Rix, clarinet and bass clarinet
- John Harle, soprano and alto saxophone
- David Roach, soprano and alto saxophone
- Andrew Findon tenor and baritone saxophone, flute, piccolo
- Steve Sidwell, trumpet
- Marjory Dunn, horn
- Nigel Barr, bass trombone and euphonium

The film does not contain the "Ariel Songs", but includes an instrumental prelude, which is "Miranda" from Prospero's Books. It also includes a letter from Letters, Riddles and Writs.

The only cast credits on the film itself are to Ute Lemper and the Michael Nyman Band. The band members are credited (with Marjorie Dunn and Beverley Davison's names misspelled as above) in the order above in a booklet packaged with the videocassette and DVD. The DVD edition is coupled with Ute Lemper Chante Kurt Weill.

== See also ==
- Six Celan Songs • The Ballad of Kastriot Rexhepi
