= Six Celan Songs; The Ballad of Kastriot Rexhepi =

Six Celan Songs • The Ballad of Kastriot Rexhepi
- photograph by Michael Nyman design by Russell Mills and Michael Webster

Studio album by Michael Nyman
- Released: July 31, 2006 (UK); June 24, 2008 (United States)
- Recorded: 28 and 29 November November 2005, Angel Recording Studios (Six Celan Songs); 20 January 2006, Angel Recording Studios (The Ballad of Kastriot Rexhepi)
- Genre: Art song, contemporary classical, minimalist music
- Length: 53:57
- Language: German (Six Celan Songs); English (The Ballad of Kastriot Rexhepi)
- Label: MN Records
- Producer: Michael Nyman

Michael Nyman chronology
The Composer's Cut Series Vol. III: The Piano (2006)	Six Celan Songs • The Ballad of Kastriot Rexhepi (2006)	Acts of Beauty • Exit no Exit (2006)

Professional ratings
Review scores
Source	Rating
The Guardian	4/5 stars

Six Celan Songs • The Ballad of Kastriot Rexhepi is the 54th album released by Michael Nyman, who composed and conducted both the works on the album. The first, a setting of poetry by Paul Celan, was originally recorded by Ute Lemper and the Michael Nyman Band on The Michael Nyman Songbook in 1991, and here the band is joined by Hilary Summers. The Ballad of Kastriot Rexhepi is a new work created with the artist Mary Kelly. This is performed by the soprano Sarah Leonard with The Nyman Quartet: Gabrielle Lester, Catherine Thompson, Kate Musker and Tony Hinnigan.

== Track listing ==
1. Chanson einer Dame im Schatten – 7.11
2. Es war Erde in ihnen – 4.57
3. Psalm – 3.42
4. Corona – 7.09
5. Nächtlich geschürzt – 6.47
6. Blume – 6.08
7. The Ballad of Kastriot Rexhepi - 17:43

== Personnel ==
- Michael Nyman, conductor
- Gabrielle Lester, violin
- Catherine Thompson, violin
- Kate Musker, viola
- Tony Hinnigan, cello
- Nick Cooper, cello
- Chris Laurence, double bass
- Martin Elliott, bass guitar
- David Roach, soprano and alto saxophones
- Simon Haram, soprano and alto saxophones
- Robert Buckland, soprano and alto saxophones
- Andrew Findo[n], baritone saxophone, flute, piccolo
- Andrew Sparling, bass clarinet
- Steve Sidwell, trumpet
- Nigel Barr, bass trombone, euphonium
- David Arch, piano
- Hilary Summers, contralto
- Sarah Leonard, soprano
- Produced by Michael Nyman
- Recorded, mixed and edited by Austin Ince
- Assistant engineer (Six Celan Songs): James Stone
- Assistant engineer (The Ballad of Kastriot Rexhepi): Matthew Bartram
- Mixed at Abbey Road Studios 26 and 27 March 2006
- Assistant engineer: Robert Houston
- Mastered by Peter Mew at Abbey Road Studios
- Published by Chester Music Ltd 1991/2001
- Thanks to Ute Lamper, Volker Schlöndorff, Declan Colgan, Elsa Longhauser, Mary Kelly, The Photographers, Colette Barber at Abbey Road Studios, Viviana D'Ambrosio, Nigel Barr, Jane Carter
- Design by Russell Mills (shed)
- Co-design by Michael Webster (storm)
- Cover photography by Michael Nyman
- Liner notes: Michael Nyman, Michael Hamburger, Mary Kelly, Elsa Longhauser
- Celan translations: Michael Hamburger
