= The Composer's Cut Series Vol. I: The Draughtsman's Contract =

The Composer's Cut Series Vol. I The Draughtsman's Contract
- photo by Eli Lissitsky, 1924 additional photography by Michael Nyman design by Russell Mills and Michael Webster

Studio album based on The Draughtsman's Contract by Michael Nyman
- Released: April 17, 2006 (UK); July 29, 2008 (United States)
- Recorded: April 2005
- Genres: Contemporary classical music, minimalism, film score
- Length: 45:54
- Label: MN Records
- Producer: Michael Nyman

Michael Nyman chronology
The Libertine (2005)	The Composer's Cut Series Vol. I The Draughtsman's Contract (2006)	The Composer's Cut Series Vol. II: Nyman/Greenaway Revisited (2006)

Professional ratings
Review scores
Source	Rating
Music from the Movies	3/4 stars

The Composer's Cut Series Vol. I: The Draughtsman's Contract is the 51st album by Michael Nyman, recorded in 2005 with the Michael Nyman Band and released in 2006. It is the first in a series in which Nyman began rerecording some of his film music independently of the needs of film production, and the culmination and refinement of 23 years of performances of the work since the recording of the original 1982 recording of The Draughtsman's Contract.

Nyman lamented that he had failed to have a sticker placed on the album noting that it contained all-new recordings, resulting in slow sales.

== Track listing ==
The tracks are in a different order than they are on the soundtrack album.

1. Chasing sheep is best left to shepherds
2. The garden is becoming a robe room
3. An eye for optical theory
4. A watery death
5. The disposition of the linen
6. Queen of the night
7. Bravura in the face of grief

== Personnel ==
The Michael Nyman Band:

- Michael Nyman, piano, harpsichord, and conductor
- Gabrielle Lester, violin
- Catherine Thompson, violin
- Kate Musker, viola
- David Roach, saxophones
- Simon Haram, saxophones
- Andrew Findon, saxophones
- Martin Elliott, bass guitar
- Dave Lee, horn
- Steve Sidwell, trumpet
- Nigel Barr, bass trombone
- Ian Humphries, Beverley Davison, Mia Cooper (violinist), Lizzie Bull, additional violins (track 2)

Note that of these players, only Nyman and Findon played on the original soundtrack recording.

- produced by Michael Nyman
- engineered and mixed by Austin Ince
