= Michael Nyman Orchestra =

The Michael Nyman Orchestra
- Origin: London, England
- Genres: contemporary classical music film scores
- Years active: 1993-present
- Labels: Piano; EMI/Virgin/Venture/Caroline; Editions EG; Jay; Argo; SLC; Warner Bros. MN Music

The Michael Nyman Orchestra is a group that expands on the Michael Nyman Band for specific album work, often for movie soundtracks.

== History ==
In 1993, the Michael Nyman Band joined an orchestra for the first time in their recording history with MGV: Musique à Grand Vitesse. The album credit is to "The Michael Nyman Band and Orchestra".

The Michael Nyman Orchestra has operated as a formal group since then. Such soundtrack albums as Practical Magic, Ravenous, The End of the Affair, The Claim, and The Libertine are credited to this Orchestra. While the former two titles lack detailed credits, the latter three albums show that most of the Orchestra has remained consistent.

== Personnel ==
From the 2000 soundtrack album The Claim.

=== Violin ===
- Alexander Balanescu (leader)
- Cathy Thompson
- Maciej Rokowski
- Patrick Kiernan
- Ann Morfee
- Mark Berrow
- Paul Willey
- Rachel Allen
- Tom Bowes
- Ian Humphries
- Boguslav Kosteci
- Dermot Crehan
- Philippa Ibbotson
- Jonathan Evans-Jones
- Julian Leaper
- Ed Coxon
- Peter Hanson
- Helen Paterson

=== Viola ===
- Kate Musker
- Steve Tees
- Vicci Wardman
- Bruce White
- Andy Parker
- Paul Martin

=== Cello ===
- Anthony Hinnigan
- Sophie Harris
- Nick Cooper
- William Schofield

=== Double Bass ===
- Mike Brittain
- Paul Sherman

=== Bass guitar ===
- Martin Elliott

=== Oboe/Cor Anglais ===
- Chris Hooker

=== Clarinet/Bass Clarinet ===
- Dave Fuest

=== Flute/Piccolo ===
- Jonathan Snowden

=== Soprano Sax/Alto Sax ===
- Dave Roach
- Simon Haram

=== Baritone Sax ===
- Andy Findon

=== Trumpet/Flugel/Piccolo Trumpet ===
- Steve Sidwell

=== French Horn ===
- Dave Lee
- Paul Gargham

=== Trombone/Tuba ===
- Nigel Barr

=== Percussion ===
- Greg Knowles
