= The Very Best of Michael Nyman: Film Music 1980–2001 =

The Very Best of Michael Nyman: Film Music 1980-2001

Compilation album by Michael Nyman
- Released: November 6, 2001
- Genre: Film score
- Label: Virgin Records

The Very Best of Michael Nyman: Film Music 1980–2001 is a compilation album film music by Michael Nyman. It was released on November 6, 2001, by Virgin Records. It including three previously unreleased tracks (from Nelly's Version and Monsieur Hire) and one from the limited release, La Traversée de Paris. Some tracks are from the original soundtracks, while others are from pre-existing rerecordings such as The Essential Michael Nyman Band and Live.

== Track listing ==
=== Disc 1 ===
1. Bird List (04:16) from The Falls/Live
2. Chasing Sheep Is Best Left to Shepherds (05:26) from The Draughtsman's Contract/The Essential Michael Nyman Band
3. An Eye for Optical Theory (05:09) from The Draughtsman's Contract/soundtrack
4. Homage to Maurice (02:16) from Nelly's Version (previously unreleased)
5. Angelfish Decay (02:49) from A Zed and Two Noughts/soundtrack
6. Time Lapse (03:58) from A Zed and Two Noughts/The Essential Michael Nyman Band
7. Trysting Fields (03:27) from Drowning by Numbers/soundtrack
8. Wheelbarrow Walk (02:12) from Drowning by Numbers/The Essential Michael Nyman Band
9. Knowing the Ropes (03:17) from Drowning by Numbers/The Essential Michael Nyman Band
10. Memorial (12:00) from The Cook, The Thief, His Wife & Her Lover/The Essential Michael Nyman Band
11. Skating (01:26) from Monsieur Hire (previously unreleased)
12. Peeking (02:43) from Monsieur Hire (previously unreleased)
13. Abandoning (03:30) from Le Mari de la Coiffeuse
14. Skirting (02:05) from Le Mari de la Coiffeuse
15. Miranda Previsited (06:48) from Prospero's Books/La Traversée de Paris
16. Here to There (01:00) from The Piano
17. The Heart Asks Pleasure First/The Promise (03:10) from The Piano
18. All Imperfect Things (04:02) from The Piano
19. Dreams of a Journey (05:03) from The Piano

=== Disc 2 ===
1. Escape (03:38) from À la folie
2. Fly Drive (01:32) from Carrington
3. The Infinite Complexities Of Christmas (04:12) from Carrington
4. If (04:25) from The Diary of Anne Frank
5. Abel Carries Ephraim (05:55) from The Ogre
6. Becoming Jerome/God's Hands (02:58) from Gattaca
7. The Morrow (03:11) from Gattaca
8. The Other Side (03:41) from Gattaca
9. The Departure (03:49) from Gattaca
10. Convening the Coven (04:05) from Practical Magic
11. Stranger at the Window (01:38) from Ravenous
12. Cannibal Fantasy (02:12) from Ravenous
13. Molly (02:51) from Wonderland
14. Eddie (03:56) from Wonderland
15. Dan (02:15) from Wonderland
16. Eileen (03:41) from Wonderland
17. Sarah Dies (02:58) from The End Of The Affair
18. The End of the Affair (02:56) from The End Of The Affair
19. The Shootout (05:06) from The Claim
20. The Burning (09:18) from The Claim
