= The Essential Michael Nyman Band =

- Cover design by Russell Warren-Fisher from a photo by Steve Pyke

Studio album by Michael Nyman
- Released: November 10, 1992 (UK); January 19, 1993 (United States)
- Recorded: 1992, JVC Victor Studios, Tokyo, Japan
- Genre: Contemporary classical music, minimalist music, film music
- Length: 67:18
- Language: English
- Label: Argo

Michael Nyman chronology
| The Hairdresser's Husband (1992) | The Essential Michael Nyman Band (1992) | Time Will Pronounce (1993) |

Professional ratings
Review scores
| Source | Rating |
|---|---|
| AllMusic | 4.5/5 stars |

The Essential Michael Nyman Band is a studio album featuring a collection of music by Michael Nyman written for the films of Peter Greenaway and newly performed by the Michael Nyman Band. It is the seventeenth album release by Nyman. The album features liner notes by Annette Morreau, who describes the album as "a summation and digest of ten years of progress in the performance of music by a composer -- a composer with whom, so evidently, a group of friends and expert musicians intimately identify their total commitment, virtuosity, and joyous enthusiasm."

As the works on the album were written as concert pieces before being transmuted into film music, some of the selections, particularly "Chasing Sheep Is Best Left to Shepherds" contain more material than their film versions, and some are very different in style, such as "An Eye for Optical Theory", with a tempo more than double from its original in The Draughtsman's Contract. The other films from which the music is derived are A Zed & Two Noughts (where it was originally not performed by the Michael Nyman Band), Drowning By Numbers, The Cook The Thief His Wife & Her Lover, Making a Splash, and Prospero's Books.

Nyman created a similar album in 2005 with The Composer's Cut Series Vol. II: Nyman/Greenaway Revisited. Fan reaction has generally been that The Essential Michael Nyman Band is the superior album.

== Track listing ==
1. Chasing sheep is best left to shepherds
2. An eye for optical theory
3. The garden is becoming a robe room
4. Prawn watching
5. Time lapse
6. Fish Beach
7. Wheelbarrow Walk
8. Knowing the Ropes
9. Miserere paraphrase
10. Memorial
11. Stroking
  Synchronizing
12. Miranda

Tracks 1–3 from The Draughtsman's Contract. Tracks 4–5 from A Zed and Two Noughts. Tracks 6–8 from Drowning by Numbers. Tracks 9–10 from The Cook, The Thief, His Wife and Her Lover. Track 11 from Making a Splash. Track 12 from Prospero's Books. "Stroking" is not the same piece that was known as "Stroking" on, The Kiss and Other Movements, but rather, "Gliding."

=== An Eye for Optical Theory ===
Track 2, An Eye for Optical Theory, is based on a four-bar harmonic frame likely originally composed by William Croft. Nyman employs the syncopated potential of the original by adding the two saxophones to layer textures consisting of individual ‘collections’ of melodies over a constantly-changing backing track in the remaining ensemble. This gives rise to a strident melodic line in the upper strings.

== Personnel ==
- Alexander Balanescu, Clare Connors, Ann Morphy, violin
- Kate Musker, viola
- Tony Hinnigan, Justin Pearson, cello
- Martin Elliott, bass guitar
- John Harle, David Roach, soprano & alto saxophone
- Andrew Findon, baritone saxophone, flute, piccolo
- Steve Sidwell, trumpet
- Marjorie Dunn, horn
- Nigel Barr, bass trombone, euphonium
- John Lenehan, piano
- Michael Nyman, piano (tracks 1, 2, 3, 11, 12)
- Sarah Leonard, soprano (tracks 9, 10, 12)
- Linda Hirst, mezzo-soprano (track 12)
- Photographs courtesy of the Tokyo Globe Theatre

This recording made at the JVC Victor Studios, Tokyo

- Engineer: Michael J. Dutton
- Mixed at Kitsch Studio, Brussels
- Edited by Michael J. Dutton at Abbey Road Studios, London
- Publishers: Chester Music Ltd/Kelly Music Ltd; EG Music Ltd (track 11)
- Art direction: David Smart
- Cover design by Russell Warren-Fisher from a photo by Steve Pyke
