= Noises, Sounds & Sweet Airs =

Noises, Sounds & Sweet Airs is a 1991 opera by Michael Nyman that began as an opera-ballet titled La Princesse de Milan choreographed by Karine Saporta. The libretto is William Shakespeare's The Tempest, as abridged by the composer. The title is derived from Caliban's line, "This isle is full of noises, sounds, and sweet airs, which give delight and hurt not." It premiered in June 1991 in Hérouville-Saint-Clair, Calvados, France, with the L'Ensemble de Basse-Normandie conducted by Dominique Debart. Three members of Saporta's dance company provided the singing.

The opera is scored for one soprano, one contralto, and one tenor, two saxophones, and orchestra. The three singers are not assigned roles on character lines. They are voices, "carriers of text", and two or three singers often sing the role of a single character at points in the opera, and no character is sung consistently by any one voice. As originally performed, the dancers portrayed the characters. Nyman's liner notes of the recording give no indication of how the opera could be staged dramatically without the dancers, even though which title is used is dependent upon whether dancers are utilized. The opera-only version, which premiered in 1993, also includes more of Shakespeare's text.

Nyman and Saporta collaborated on Prospero's Books, Peter Greenaway's film version of The Tempest, and were interested in working further with the play. Nyman did not base his score on that he wrote for Prospero's Books, but began a new score from scratch, occasionally interpolating music from the previous score as is his wont. He chose not to set Ariel's songs or the Masque, which he had already set, but he allows for them to be interpolated into the opera.

== Libretto ==
The libretto, an abridgement of Shakespeare's play (with some slight wording changes) is divided into seventeen sections:

1. If by your Art, my dearest father (Act I, Scene 2)
2. Alas, poor Milan! (Act I, Scene 2)
3. Be't to fly (Act I, Scene 2)
4. This damned witch Sycorax (Act I, Scene 2)
5. The fringed curtains of thine eye advance (Act I, Scene 2)
6. There's nothing ill can dwell in such a temple (Act I, Scene 2)
7. How lush and lusty the grass looks! (Act II, Scene 1)
8. Riches, poverty, and use of service, none (Act II, Scene 1)
9. Sometime like apes/The master, the gunner, the boatswain, and I (Act II, Scene 2)
10. Full many a lady I have eyed with best regard (Act III, Scene 1)
11. 'Tis a custom in the afternoon to sleep (Act III, Scenes 2 and 3)
12. I have made you mad (Act III, Scene 3, Act IV, Scene 1)
13. You do look, my son, in a moved sort (Act IV, Scene 1, Act V, Scene 1)
14. Ye elves (Act V, Scene 1)
15. Thy brother was a furtherer in the act. (Act V, Scene 1)
16. Sir, she is mortal (Act V, Scene 1)
17. My tricksy spirit! (Act V, Scene 1)

Nyman allows for "The Masque", written for Prospero's Books, to be inserted between Sections 12 and 13. If the Ariel songs were included (which Nyman says nothing about doing in the liner notes, and the music as recorded does not necessarily pause), "Come Unto These Yellow Sands" and "Full Fathom Five" would come between sections 4 and 5, "While You Here Do Snoring Lie" between sections 8 and 9, "Come and Go" immediately before "The Masque," and "Where the Bee Sucks" just before "Behold, sir King" as divided on the album, based on the order of the text in the play.

== Album ==
Noises, Sounds & Sweet Airs

Studio album by Michael Nyman
- Released: May 16, 1995
- Recorded: June 1991 (Caen); June 1993 (Abbey Road Studios)
- Genres: Opera, Contemporary classical music, minimalism
- Length: 72:35
- Language: English
- Label: Argo
- Producers: David Cunningham; Michael Nyman

Michael Nyman chronology
Live (1994)	Noises, Sounds & Sweet Airs (1995)	Carrington (1995)

The album, Nyman's 25th release, was released by Argo Records on May 16, 1995. It has a running time of 72:35. It was again performed by L'Ensemble de Basse-Normandie conducted by Dominque Debart. The saxophones are played by David Roach and Andrew Findon. It is the fourth release of Nyman's music that Nyman himself supervised, on which he provides liner notes and produced, but neither performs nor conducts. The album is the first of Nyman's many collaborations with Hilary Summers.

=== Personnel ===
==== Cast ====
- Catherine Bott, soprano
- Hilary Summers, contralto
- Ian Bostridge, tenor
- David Roach, saxophone
- Andrew Findon, saxophone
- Dominique Debart, conductor

==== Crew ====
- Instrumental recording produced by David Cunningham & Michael Nyman
- Vocal recording produced by Andrew Cornall & Michael Nyman
- Mixed by Michael J. Dutton & Michael Nyman
- Executive producer: Michael J. Dutton
- Engineer: Michael J. Dutton
- Assistant engineers: Chris Brown & Denis Wauthy
- Artist representative for Michael Nyman: Nigel Barr
- Art direction: David Smart
- Design: Jeremy Tilston

Recorded in Caen, June 1991, and Abbey Road Studios, London, June 1993.

Mixed at Kitsch Studio, Brussels

Edited at Transfermation and Abbey Road Studios, London

=== Track listing ===
The track listing differs slightly from the sections of the opera. Up through section 12, the tracks conform to the sections. Section 13, however, is spread over three tracks, "You do look, my son, in a moved sort", "At last I left them", and "At this hour lie at my mercy." Section 15 does not start at the beginning of a new track, but is appended at the end of track 16/Section 14, "Ye elves", and begins a new track with "Behold, sir King" (possibly done to facilitate the editing in of Ariel's songs from Prospero's Books, if desired). Finally, section 17, is divided into two tracks, "My tricksy spirit!" and "Coragio, bully-monster", for a total of twenty tracks from the seventeen sections.

1. If by your Art, my dearest father 4:02
2. Alas, poor Milan! 3:51
3. Be't to fly 3:40
4. This damned witch Sycorax 4:37
5. The fringed curtains of thine eye 4:35
6. There's nothing ill can dwell 2:46
7. How lush and lusty the grass 3:12
8. Riches, poverty, and use of service 2:21
9. Sometime like apes 2:49
10. Full many a lady I have eyed 4:35
11. 'Tis a custom in the afternoon to sleep 5:37
12. I have made you mad 4:15
13. You do look, my son, in a moved sort 3:40
14. At last I left them 1:30
15. At this hour lie at my mercy 1:48
16. Ye elves 6:56
17. Behold, sir King 2:05
18. Sir, she is mortal 1:42
19. My tricksy spirit! 3:03
20. Coragio, bully-monster 5:51

== See also ==
Caliban
