= À la folie =

- Directed by: Diane Kurys
- Written by: Diane Kurys; Antoine Lacomblez
- Produced by: Alexandre Arcady
- Starring: Anne Parillaud; Béatrice Dalle; Patrick Aurignac
- Cinematography: Fabio Conversi
- Edited by: Luc Barnier
- Music by: Michael Nyman
- Distributed by: Pan Européenne Distribution
- Release date: 28 September 1994
- Running time: 98 minutes
- Country: France
- Language: French
- Box office: $960.000

À la folie ("To Madness") (English: 6 Days, 6 Nights) is a 1994 French drama film by Diane Kurys with music by Michael Nyman. It entered the competition at the 51st Venice International Film Festival.

== Cast ==
- Anne Parillaud as Alice
- Béatrice Dalle as Elsa
- Patrick Aurignac as Franck
- Bernard Verley as Sanders
- Alain Chabat as Thomas
- Jean-Claude de Goros as Raymond
- Marie Guillard as Betty
- Michael Massee (uncredited)

== Plot ==
Two rival sisters, Alice and Elsa, have been apart for two years. Alice, a promising young artist, lives in an attic flat in Paris. Her lover Franck, a boxer, has just moved in with her. Problems for the happy couple ensue when Elsa, a bored housewife, suddenly appears unannounced at their door after leaving her cheating husband Thomas and their two children, and a menage-a-trois develops. Elsa immediately begins trying to dominate their lives. Alice wants the out-of-control Elsa, who disrupts their life by playing psychological games with them, to leave, but then suddenly changes her mind, unable to bring herself to throw Elsa out. To thank her, Elsa destroys her art studio, has sex with Franck, convinces him that Alice is unbalanced, and then ties Alice up in her apartment.

== Music ==
à la folie
- photography by Jean-Marie Leroy design by Dave McKean

Soundtrack album by Michael Nyman
- Released: 16 September 1994 (France); 20 March 1995 (UK); 21 March 1995 (United States)
- Recorded: 14 March 1994, May 1994, CTS Studios, London
- Genre: Soundtrack, Contemporary classical music, Minimalist music
- Length: 49:15
- Label: Virgin Venture
- Producer: Michael Nyman

Michael Nyman chronology
The Piano Concerto/MGV (1994)	à la folie (1994)	Live (1994)

6 Days 6 Nights
- UK/US cover (1995)

The music by Michael Nyman has been praised as one of his better works, and considered unusually buried in the sound mix of the film. The album is Nyman's 23rd release, and the fourteenth with the Michael Nyman Band. The American album became very difficult to come by; American Nyman fans attempting to special order the album only a few years later were often presented with copies of Randy Edelman's Six Days Seven Nights, derived from distributors' fuzzy searches. In France, however, the album was promoted as "Michael Nyman Nouvel Album."

The score features yet another of Michael Nyman's waltzes. "Waltzing the Bird" is based on Nyman's early "Waltz in F," which appeared on Michael Nyman, although it develops in a very different direction. "Love Theme" is a very loose reworking of material from the String Quartet No. 3 with material from other themes written for the score of the film.

The only liner notes on the French release of the album are an uncredited synopsis of the film in French.

=== Track listing ===
1. Solitude 1:36
2. Broken Glass 4:58
3. Sisters 1:42
4. The Intruder 2:40
5. Waltzing the Bird 3:16
6. A New Beginning 1:22
7. Stolen Memories 5:48
8. À la Folie... 5:48
9. The Streets of Paris 2:39
10. Love Forever 1:19
11. Love Theme 2:35
12. Point of No Return 2:55
13. Escape 3:37
14. Broken Dreams 4:19
15. Dark Fantasy 2:25
16. Six Days, Six Nights 5:51

=== Personnel ===
Musicians from the Michael Nyman Band

- Beverley Davison – violin
- Ann Morfee – violin
- Marshall Marcus – violin
- Katherine Shave – violin
- Kate Musker – viola
- Anthony Hinnigan – cello
- William Schofield – cello
- Christopher Laurence – bass
- Tim Amhurst – bass
- John Harle – soprano/alto saxophones
- David Roach – soprano/alto saxophones
- Andrew Findon – flute/piccolo/baritone saxophone
- Nigel Barr – Trombone/Tuba
- Steve Sidwell – trumpet/Flugelhorn/piccolo trumpet
- Marjorie Dunn – horn
- Martin Elliott – bass guitar
- Michael Nyman – piano
- music composed, arranged, conducted, and produced by Michael Nyman
- Published by Chester Music Ltd./Michael Nyman Ltd.
- Engineer: Michael J. Dutton
- Assistant Engineer: Dillon Gallagher
- Mixed at CTS Studios, London
- Edited at Transfermation and Abbey Road Studios, London
- Artist representative for Michael Nyman: Nigel Barr
- Design, illustration, and photography by Dave McKean @ Hourglass
- Photography from 6 Days 6 Nights by Jean-Marie Leroy
