= Michael Nyman Live =

Live
- art by Dave McKean

Live album by Michael Nyman
- Released: October 18, 1994
- Recorded: 14–15 May 1994
- Genre: Contemporary classical music
- Length: 73:58
- Label: Virgin/Venture
- Producer: Michael Nyman, Michael J. Dutton

Michael Nyman chronology
À la folie (1994)	Live (1994)	Noises, Sounds & Sweet Airs (1995)

Singles from Live
- 1. "In Re Don Giovanni" Released: 1994

Live is a 1994 album by Michael Nyman and the Michael Nyman Band. It is Nyman's 24th release and the fifteenth with the Band. It is the first commercial live album by the band, which had previously performed live on the magazine release, 'The Masterwork' Award Winning Fish-Knife. It is also known as "The Upside-Down Violin", the only new composition on the album, and the working title, Breaking the Rules, made it into many computer sales systems. The album's cover and booklet were designed by Dave McKean. Liner notes are by David Toop. Early printings of the album cover listed the first three tracks erroneously as "Queen of the Night", "An Eye for Optical Theory", and "Chasing Sheep Is Best Left to Shepherds"

== Track listing ==
1. "In Re Don Giovanni"
2. "Bird List"
3. "Queen of the Night"
4. "Dipping"
5. "Stroking"
6. "Slow"
7. "Faster"
8. "Faster Still"
9. "To the Edge of the Earth"
10. "The Promise/The Heart Asks Pleasure First"
11. "Here To There"
12. "Lost & Found"
13. "The Embrace"
14. "All Imperfect Things"
15. "Dreams of A Journey"
16. "Here To There (Encore)"

== Personnel ==
- Musicians from the Michael Nyman Band
  - Michael Nyman, piano
  - Jonathan Carney, violin
  - Bill Hawkes, violin
  - Catherine Musker, viola
  - Tony Hinnigan, cello
  - John Harle, soprano/alto saxophones
  - David Roach, soprano/alto saxophones
  - Andrew Findon, flute/piccolo/baritone saxophone
  - Nigel Barr, trombone/tuba/euphonium
  - Martin Elliott, bass guitar
- Extra musicians on tracks from The Piano
  - Guergui Stoianov Boiadjev (violin)
  - Nanko Mikov Dimitrov (violin)
  - Evelina Nedeva Arabadjieva (violin)
  - Kantcho Stefanov Kantchev (violin)
  - Nediltcho Suilianov Hristov (viola)
  - Stefan Todorov Jilkov (viola)
  - Marieta Mihaylova Ivanova (cello)
  - Emilia Hrostova Radilova (cello)
- Musicians from Orquesta Andaluzi de Tetouan on Upside-Down Violin
  - Abdessadeq Cheqara (violin)
  - Abdella Chekara (laud)
  - Jelloul Najidi (kanoun)
  - Ahmed Taoud (violin)
  - Driss Aaufi (saxophone)
  - Ahmet Mrabet (clarinet)
  - Abdesslam Beniisa (cello)
  - Mohamed Achaalh (banderita (tambourine))
  - Jalla Chekara (violin)
  - Nour-Din Aghbal (violin)
  - Abdelouahid El Bazi (derboliga (drum))
  - Mohammed Chkara (cello)
  - Manager of Orquesta Andaluzi de Tetouan: Mehdi Emrane
- conducted by Michael Nyman
- composed, arranged, and directed by Michael Nyman
- produced by Michael Nyman and Michael J. Dutton
- engineer: Michael J. Dutton
- assistant engineer: Will Shapland
- Recorded with The Manor Mobile at Paraninfo de la Universidad, Albacete on 14 May 1994 and Teatro Monumental, Madrid on 15 May 1994.
- Mixed at Kitsch Studios, Brussels
- Edited at Transfermation, London
- artist representative for Michael Nyman: Nigel Barr
- design, illustration, and photography by Dave McKean @ Hourglass
- Live and portrait photography by Lester Po Fun Lee
