= Michael Nyman Band =

The Michael Nyman Band
- Also known as: Campiello Band
- Origin: London, England
- Genres: Contemporary classical music Minimalist music Film scores
- Years active: 1976–present
- Labels: Piano; EMI/Virgin/Venture/Caroline; Editions EG; Jay; Argo; SLC; Warner Bros. MN Music
- Members: Michael Nyman; Andrew Findon; David Roach; Kate Musker; Tony Hinnigan; Simon Haram; Martin Elliott; Nigel Barr; Toby Coles; Paul Gardham; Ian Humphries; Gabrielle Lester
- Past members: Alexander Balanescu; John Harle; Elisabeth Perry; Steve Saunders; David Fuest; Jonathan Carney; Graham Ashton; Clare Connors; David Rix; Richard Clews; Marjorie Dunn; Ann Morfee; Bill Hawkes; Katherine Shave; Bruce White; Nigel Gomm; Georgina Born

The Michael Nyman Band, formerly known as the Campiello Band, is a group formed as a street band for a 1976 production of Carlo Goldoni's 1756 play, Il Campiello directed by Bill Bryden at the Old Vic. The band did not wish to break up after the production ended, so its director, Michael Nyman, began composing music for the group to perform, beginning with "In Re Don Giovanni", written in 1977. Originally made up of old instruments such as rebecs, sackbuts and shawms alongside more modern instruments like the banjo and saxophone to produce as loud a sound as possible without amplification, it later switched to a fully amplified line-up of string quartet, double bass, clarinet, three saxophones, horn, trumpet, bass trombone, bass guitar, and piano. This lineup has been variously altered and augmented for some works.

== History ==
The band's first recorded album on a professional label was Nyman's second, the self-titled Michael Nyman (1981), which mostly comprised pieces written for the early films of Peter Greenaway. This album was not released on compact disc until 2012. Another self-titled album (1995) has appeared as a promotional item compiling tracks from various other albums, and should not be confused with this one.

Along with soundtracks to Greenaway's The Draughtsman's Contract, Drowning by Numbers, and The Cook The Thief His Wife & Her Lover, their 1980s output included The Kiss and Other Movements (which includes the titular art song; a song from Nyman's projected Tristram Shandy opera; a tango; a movement from the same work as "Memorial" as used in Greenaway's 26 Bathrooms; and a performance of music (not the original soundtrack) from Greenaway's Making a Splash) and the modern dance work And Do They Do. They also made a limited edition recording of Nyman's La Traversée de Paris in 1989; many of its individual movements were soon to be dismantled, revised, or simply transplanted whole, to serve as the soundtrack for Greenaway's Prospero's Books (1991). Conversely, Nyman composed music for another adaptation of William Shakespeare's The Tempest, the ballet-opera Noises, Sounds & Sweet Airs, soon after Prospero's Books, some of which was derived from La Traversée de Paris.

Their 1992 album, The Essential Michael Nyman Band, may appear to be a greatest hits compilation, but is actually composed of the concert versions of various film pieces, having undergone years of revisions and refinement, are significantly different from their soundtrack counterparts, to a far more severe extent than typical differences between classical music performances. This album also contains two cuts from the film score to A Zed & Two Noughts, which was originally performed by an orchestra of musicians who were never members of the band, with solos by band members Nyman, Balanescu, Perry, and Leonard. Similarly, The Piano was performed by members of the Munich Philharmonic Orchestra with Harle, Roach, Findon, and Nyman, but is also part of the band's repertoire.

In 1993, the band joined with an orchestra for the first time in their recording history with MGV: Musique à Grand Vitesse, a piece commissioned for the opening of a TGV line, first performed on 26 September 1993, in which the band, according to Nyman's own liner notes, represents the tracks, "resisting the temptation of the concerto grosso". The album credit is to "The Michael Nyman Band and Orchestra".

== Associated acts ==
The group has largely been superseded by the Michael Nyman Orchestra. Such soundtrack albums as Practical Magic, Ravenous, The End of the Affair, The Claim, and The Libertine are credited to this group, first implied on that 1994 album. While the former two titles lack detailed credits, the latter three albums show that most of the band (not to say most of those credited as full members over its history) performs in the Orchestra. The band's existence is far from over, however, as Nyman orchestrated his 2002 opera, Facing Goya, specifically for the band. His previous two opera recordings include band members but are not formally credited to the band, and one, the aforementioned Noises, Sounds & Sweet Airs, uses a full-scale orchestra, without Nyman at the baton. Man and Boy: Dada (2004) and Love Counts (2005; recorded 2007), Nyman's newest operas, feature the band conducted by Paul McGrath.

In 1996, another offshoot group, The Nyman Quartet, consisting of Cathy Thompson, Gabrielle Lester, Kate Musker, and Tony Hinnigan, recorded The Ballad of Kastriot Rexhepi (with Sarah Leonard--the only singer ever credited as a band member) and Exit No Exit, and plan to record the third recording of Nyman's four string quartets.

They are produced by David Cunningham.

Many of the current and former band members, including John Harle, Alexander Balanescu, Dave Lee, Madeleine Mitchell, Andrew Findon, and Simon Haram, have released solo albums that include performances of Nyman's music.

== Lineup ==
The membership in the band is rather fluid, though it has had many core members. Often, whoever plays with the band on a given album is credited as a full member, though just as often, non-members are credited as guest artists. The following people have received credit as full-fledged members on at least one album, followed by a list of every instrument that they have been credited with playing at any time. The recordings prior to Michael Nyman (1981) did not credit individual band members.

(Listed chronologically)

- Michael Nyman (1976–), composer, conductor, piano, harpsichord, kurzweil
- Rory Allam (1981), clarinet
- Alexander Bălănescu (1981–1993, 1999–2002), violin
- Anne Barnard (1981), french horn
- Ben Grove (1981), bass guitar
- John Harle (1981–1999), soprano saxophone, alto saxophone, tenor saxophone
- Nick Hayley (1981), rebec, violin
- Ian Mitchell (1981–1982), clarinet, bass clarinet, alto saxophone
- Elisabeth Perry (1981–1991, 1998), violin, viola
- Steve Saunders (1981–1991), bass trombone, euphonium
- Roderick Skeaping (1981), rebec, violin
- Keith Thompson (1981–1982), flute, piccolo, recorder, tenor saxophone
- Doug Wootton (1981), banjo
- Malcolm Bennett (1982), bass guitar
- Andrew Findon (1980–), tenor saxophone, baritone saxophone, piccolo, flute, bass flute, alto flute
- Barry Guy (1982), double bass
- David Fuest (1985, 1986, 1989, 2007), clarinet, bass clarinet
- John Greaves (1985), bass guitar
- David Roach (1985–), soprano, alto and tenor saxophones
- Sarah Leonard (1985–1991), soprano
- Rupert Bawden (1986), viola
- Ruth Phillips (1986, 1991), cello
- Jonathan "John" Carney (1987–1991), violin, viola
- Catherine "Kate" Musker (1987–), viola
- Anthony "Tony" Hinnigan (1987–), cello
- Miranda Fulleylove, also spelled "Fullylove" (1988, 1999), violin
- Rosemary Furniss (1988), violin
- Briony Shaw (1988), violin
- Jackie Shave (1988, 1989, 1999), violin
- Joe Rappaport (1988), viola
- Andrew Shulman (1988), cello
- Robin McGee (1988–1989), double bass
- John Wilbraham (1988), trumpet, flugelhorn
- Michael Thompson (1988), french horn
- Christopher "Chris" Laurence also spelled "Lawrence" (1989, 1994, 1999, 2006–), double bass
- Graham Ashton (1989–1992), trumpet, flugelhorn
- David Stewart (also spelled "Stuart") (1989), trombone
- Clare Connors (1989–1994), violin
- Justin Pearson (1989–1992, 2005), cello
- Paul Morgan (1989, 1991, 1999, 2004), double bass
- David Rix (1989, 1991–1999, 2004), clarinet, bass clarinet
- Jamie Talbot (1989, 1991, 1995, 2005), soprano and alto saxophones
- Simon Haram (1989, 1996–), soprano and alto saxophones
- Richard Clews (1989, 1991, 1995–1996), french horn, Wagner tuba
- Huw Jenkins (1989), horn
- Fenella Barton (1989), violin
- Gabrielle "Gaby" Lester (1989, 2002–), violin
- Iris Juda (1989), violin
- Jonathan Rees (1989, 1999), violin
- Lyn Fletcher, violin
- Mayumi Seiler, violin
- Michael "Mike" McMenemy (1989, 1991, 1992, 1994), violin
- Richard Ehrlich, violin
- Roger Tapping, viola
- Jane Salmen, cello
- Tim Hugh, cello
- Lynda Herighten, double bass
- Martin Elliott (1989, 1991–1995, (live only 1996–1998) 1999–), bass guitar
- Richard Watkins (1989), horn
- Tim Amhurst also spelled "Amherst" (1991, 1994), double bass
- Lynda Houghton (1991), double bass
- Marjorie Dunn (1991–1994), horn
- Nigel Barr (1991–), bass trombone, euphonium, tuba
- Madeleine Mitchell (1992), violin
- Beverley "Bev" Davison (1992, 1994, 1995, 1999, 2005), violin official site
- Ann Morfee (also spelled Morphy) (1992–1994, 1999, 2002), violin
- Steven "Steve" Sidwell (1992–), trumpet, flugelhorn, piccolo trumpet
- Jonathan Lenahan (1992), piano
- Marshall Marcus (1994), violin
- Katherine "Kathy" Shave (1994, 1999–2002), violin
- William Schofield (1994, 2007), cello
- William "Bill" Hawkes (1994, 1996, 1999), violin
- Claire Thompson (1995), violin
- Nicholas Ward (1995), violin
- Boguslav Kosteci/Boguslow Kosteki (1995), violin
- Harriet Davies (1995), violin
- Bruce White (1995, 1999–), viola
- Philip D'Arcy (1995, 1999), viola
- Jim Sleigh (1995), viola
- Tony Lewis (1995), cello
- David Lee (1996–), french horn, Wagner tuba
- Nigel Gomm (1996, 1998, 2002, 2007–), trumpet, flugelhorn
- Nigel Black, (1996) french horn, Wagner tuba
- Paul Gargham, (1996) french horn, Wagner tuba
- Chris Davies (1996), french horn, Wagner tuba
- Gary Kettel (1996), drums
- Rachel Browne (1998), violin
- Prunella Pacey (1998), violin
- Melissa Phelps (1998), cello
- Andrew Fawbert (1998, 2002), bass trombone, tuba, euphonium
- Sophie Landon (1999), violin
- Fran Andrade (1999), violin
- Jonathan Evans-Jones (1999, 2007), violin
- Andrew Parker (1999), viola
- Sophie Harris (1999), cello
- Ian Humphries, violin (2002, 2005, 2007–)
- Elizabeth Burley (2002)
- Cathy Thompson (2002) violin
- Gillian Findlay (2002), violin
- Roger Linley (2002), double bass
- Stephen Williams (2002), double bass
- James Woodrow (2002), electric guitar
- Edward Coxon, violin (2003)
- Richard Cookson, viola (2003)
- Nicholas "Nick" Cooper, cello (2003, 2005)
- Mary Scully, double bass (2003, 2006)
- Rebecca Hirsch, violin (2004–2005)
- Melinda Maxwell, oboe (2004)
- Gareth Hulse, oboe (2004)
- Andrew Sparling, clarinet, bass clarinet (2004, 2005, 2007)
- Christopher Gunia, bassoon (2004)
- Richard Benjafield, percussion (2004)
- Dominic Saunders, piano (2004, 2006)
- Ian Humphries, violin (2005)
- Mia Cooper, violin (2005)
- Lizzie Bull, violin (2005)
- Morvent Bruce, violin (2005)
- James Boyd, viola (2005)
- John Metcalfe, viola (2005)
- Robert Max, cello (2005)
- Fiona McNaught, violin (2005, 2007)
- Robert Buckland, soprano and alto sax (2005)
- David Arch, piano (2005)
- Phillipa Ibbotson, violin (2006)
- Nicolette Kuo, violin (2006)
- Emlyn Singleton, violin (2006)
- Debbie Widdup, violin (2006)
- Harriet Davies, violin (2006)
- Fenella Barton, violin (2006)
- Nick Barr, viola (2006)
- Jonathan Barritt, viola (2006)
- Allen Walley, bass (2006)
- Walter Fabeck, keyboards (2006)
- Simon Chamberlain, piano (2006)

== Discography ==
- Not Necessarily English Music, a collection of experimental music from Great Britain, 1960–1977, curated by David Toop
  - Miserere by Giuseppe Verdi, arranged by M. Nyman
  - The Campiello Band: Michael Nyman, Rory Allam, Lucie Skeaping, Roddie Skeaping, Steve Saunders, Keith Thompson, Doug Wooton
  - Recorded in Clifton College, Nottingham, England, 3 March 1977. Recorded by Robert Worby.
- "The Masterwork" Award Winning Fish-Knife (1979)
  - no musician credits
- From Brussels with Love (1980) – "A Walk Through H, Part 1"
- Miniatures (1980) – "89–90–91–92"
- Michael Nyman (1981)
  - Allam, Balanescu, Barnard, Grove, Harle, Hayley, I. Mitchell, Nyman, Perry, S. Saunders, Skeaping, K. Thompson, Wootton, with Peter Brötzmann (bass clarinet, tenor saxophone), Evan Parker, (soprano saxophone), Lucy Skeaping (soprano)
- The Draughtsman's Contract (1982)
  - Nyman, Balanescu, Bennett, Findon, Guy, Harle, I. Mitchell, Perry, S. Saunders, K. Thompson
- The Kiss and Other Movements (1985)
  - Balanescu, Findon, Fuest, Greaves, Harle, Nyman, Perry, Roach, S. Saunders; with Dagmar Krause, Omar Ebrahim, Sarah Leonard (vocals), Mark Bennett (trumpet), Lowri Blake (cello), Martin Drower (trumpet), Rosemary Furniss (violin), David Purser (trombone), David Staff (trumpet), Crispian Steele-Perkins (trumpet), Theresa Ward (violin), Nigel Warren-Green (cello), Jonathan Williams (cello)
- And Do They Do (1986)
  - Balanescu, Bawden, Findon, Fuest, Nyman, Perry, Phillips, Roach
- Drowning by Numbers (1988)
  - Balanescu, Carney, Fulleylove, Furniss, Shaw, J. Shave, Musker, Carney, Rappaport, Hinningan, Shulman, McGee, Fuest, Harle, Roach, Findon, Wilbraham, M. Thompson, S. Saunders, Nyman
- La Traversée de Paris (1989)
  - Balanescu, Perry, Connors, Carney, Hinnigan, Pearson, Morgan, McGee, Rix, Fuest, Harle, Talbot, Haram, Findon, Ashton, Clews, Jenkins, S. Saunders, with Sarah Leonard, and London Voices directed by Terry Edwards
- The Cook The Thief His Wife & Her Lover (1989)
  - Balanescu, Perry, Carney, Hinnigan, Lawrence, Fuest, Harle, Roach, Findon, Ashton, Stewart, Nyman, Leonard, with London Voices directed by Terry Edwards (Paul Chapman (boy soprano), Elisabeth Harrison, Judith Rees, Sue Anderson, Sarah Leonard, Lesley Reid, Doreen Walker, Gareth Roberts, Terry Edwards, Simon Davies, Gordon Jones, Geoffrey Shaw)
- La Sept
  - Nyman, Perry, Barton, Lester, Juda, J. Shave, Rees, Fletcher, Seiler, McMeneny, Ehrlich, Musker, Tapping, Salmen, Hugh, Hinnigan, Herighten, Elliott, Rix, Harle, Roach, Findon, Stuart, Watkins, with Sylvie Caspar
- Le Mari de la Coiffeuse (The Hairdresser's Husband) (1990)
  - no musician credits
- Prospero's Books (1991)
  - Balanescu, Carney, Perry, Connors, Musker, Hinnigan, Pearson, Morgan, Amhurst, Houghton, Elliott, Rix, Harle, Roach, Talbot, Findon, Ashton, Clews, Dunn, Barr, S. Saunders, Nyman, with Sarah Leonard, Marie Angel, Ute Lemper, Deborah Conway
- The Michael Nyman Songbook sung by Ute Lemper (1991)
  - Balanescu, Perry, Connors, McMenemy, Musker, Hinnigan, Phillips, Amherst, Elliott, Rix, Harle, Roach, Findon, Ashton, Dunn, Barr, Nyman (note: The line-up in Volker Schlöndorff's concert film of the same title (1992) is different from the studio album: Nyman, Davison, M. Mitchell, Morfee, Musker, Hinnigan, Pearson, Elliott, Rix, Harle, Roach, Findon, Sidwell, Dunn, Barr)
- The Essential Michael Nyman Band (1992)
  - Balanescu, Connors, Morphy, Musker, Hinnigan, Pearson, Elliott, Harle, Roach, Findon, Sidwell, Dunn, Barr, Lenahan, Nyman, with Sarah Leonard (soprano), Linda Hirst (mezzo-soprano)
- Ai Confini: Interzone (1993) – The Final Score, Part I (complete recording released on After Extra Time in 1996)
  - Nyman, Balanescu, Connors, Morfee, Musker, Hinnigan, Pearson, Elliott, Harle, Roach, Findon, Sidwell
- MGV (Musique à Grande Vitesse) (1994)
  - Nyman, Balanescu, Connors, Hinnigan, Harle, Roach, Findon, Barr, Elliott, with Orchestra
- Anohito no Waltz (1994)
  - Nyman, Balanescu, Connors, Musker, Hinnigan, Harle, Roach, Findon, Barr, Elliott, with Hihiri Kuwano (violin), Tatsunobu Getoh (violin), Hiroshi Yamagishi (French horn), Akihiko Ikawa (trumpet)
- À la folie (Six Days, Six Nights) (1994)
  - Davison, Morfee, Marcus, K. Shave, Musker, Hinningan, Scofield, Laurence, Amhurst, Harle, Roach, Findon, Barr, Sidwell, Dunn, Elliott, Nyman
- Live (1994)
  - Nyman, Carney, Hawkes, Musker, Hinnigan, Harle, Roach, Findon, Barr, Elliott with Guergui Stoianov Boiadjev (violin), Nanko Mikov Dimitrov (violin), Evelina Nedeva Arabadjieva (violin), Kantcho Stefanov Kantchev (violin), Nediltcho Suilianov Hristov (viola), Stefan Todorov Jilkov (viola), Marieta Mihaylova Ivanova (cello), Emilia Hrostova Radilova (cello); musicians from Orquestra Andaluzi de Tetouan: Abdessadak Ckara (violin), Abdella Chekara (Laúd), Jelloul Najidi (kanoun), Ahmed Taoud (violin), Driss Aaufi (saxophone), Ahmet Mrabet (clarinet), Abdesslam Beniisa (cello), Mohamed Acgaalh (banderita (tambourine)), Jalla Chekara (violin), Nour-Din Aghbal (violin), Abdelouahid El Bazi (derboliga (drum)), Mohammed Chkara (cello)
- Carrington (1995)
  - Nyman, Davison, Morfee, Claire Thompson, Ward, Kosteki, H. Davies, Musker, White, D'Arcy, Sleigh, Hinnigan, Pearson, Lewis, Elliott, Roach, Talbot, Clews
- The Diary of Anne Frank (1995)
  - with Hilary Summers, contralto
- After Extra Time (1996)
  - Nyman, Hawkes, Morfee, Musker, Hinnigan, Harle, Roach, Findon, Barr, Sidwell, Lee, Elliott (b/w The Final Score (1993); and "Memorial" as recorded on The Essential Michael Nyman Band in 1992)
- The Ogre (1996)
  - Harle, Roach, Haram, Findon, Sidwell, Gomm, Lee, Black, Gargham, Clews, C. Davies, Barr, Kettel, Nyman, edited by Elliott
- The Suit and the Photograph (1998) – "3 Quartets"
  - Perry, Browne, Phelps, Harle, Roach, Haram, Findon, Gomm, Lee, Fawbert, Nyman
- Twentieth-Century Blues: The Songs of Noël Coward (1998)
  - "London Pride" arranged by Damon Albarn and Michael Nyman
  - No individual musician credits
- Wonderland (1999)
  - J. Shave, Davison, Rees, K. Shave, Landon, Andrade, Fullylove, Evans-Jones, Hawkes, Parker, Musker, Hinnigan, Harris, Morgan, Roach, Haram, Findon, Elliott, Lee, Sidwell, Barr, Nyman
- String Quartets 2, 3 & 4/If & Why (2002)
  - Haram, White, Humphries, Hinnigan, Morfee, Burley
- Facing Goya (2002)
  - Balanescu, Lester, Catherine Thompson, Findlay, K. Shave, Musker, White, Hinnigan, Linley, Williams, Elliott, Roach, Haram, Findon, Sidwell, Gomm, Lee, Barr, Fawbert, Woodrow, Nyman, with Winnie Böwe (soprano), Marie Angel (soprano), Hilary Summers (contralto), Harry Nicoll (tenor), Omar Ebrahim (baritone)
- Sangam: Michael Nyman Meets Indian Masters (2003)
  - Lester, Catherine Thompson, Coxon, Musker, Cookson, Hinnigan, N. Cooper, Scully, Elliott, Roach, Haram, Findon, Sidwell, Lee, Barr, Nyman, with U. Shrinivas (mandolin), Rajan Misra, Sajan Misra, Ritesh Misra, Rajnish Misra (vocals), Sanju Sahai (tabla)
- The Actors (2003)
- Man and Boy: Dada (2004)
  - Lester, Hirsch, Hinnigan, Morgan, Maxwell, Hulse, Sparling, Rix, Roach, Gunia, Benjafield, S. Saunders
- The Composer's Cut Series Vol. I: The Draughtsman's Contract (2006)
  - Nyman, Lester, Cathy Thompson, Musker, Hinnigan, Roach, Haram, Findon, Elliott, Lee, Sidwell, Barr, Humphries, Davison, M. Cooper, Bull
- The Composer's Cut Series Vol. II: Nyman/Greenaway Revisited (2006)
  - Nyman, Lester, Cathy Thompson, Musker, Hinnigan, Roach, Haram, Findon, Elliott, Lee, Sidwell, Gomm, Barr, Humphries, Davison
- The Composer's Cut Series Vol. III: The Piano (2006)
  - Nyman, Lester, Catherine Thompson, Humphries, Davison, M. Cooper, Hirsch, Bull, Bruce, Musker, Boyd, Metcalfe, Hinnigan, Max, Pearson, Elliott, Roach, Haram, Findon, Barr
- Six Celan Songs (2006)
  - Nyman, Lester, Catherine Thompson, McNaught, Musker, Hinnigan, N. Cooper, Laurence, Elliott, Roach, Haram, Buckland, Findo[n], Sparling, Sidwell, Barr, Arch, with Hilary Summers
- Love Counts (2007)
  - Humphries, Ibbotson, Kuo, Evans-Jones, Singleton, Widdup, Davies, Barton, Musker, Nick Barr, Barritt, Hinnigan, Schofield, Laurence, Scully, Walley, Elliott, D. Saunders, Fabeck, Fuest, Sparling, Findon, Lee, Sidwell, Gomm, conducted by Paul McGrath, with Helen Davies and Andrew Slater
- Mozart 252 (2008)
  - Nyman, Chamberlain, Humphries, Lester, McNaught, Catherine Thompson, Musker, Hinnigan, Elliott, Roach, Haram, Findon, Gomm, Sidwell, Lee, Barr, with Hilary Summers, Andrew Slater
- 8 Lust Songs: I Sonetti Lussuriosi (2008)
  - Lester, Cathy Thompson, Musker, Hinnigan, Elliott, Roach, Haram, Findon, Sidwell, Lee, Barr, Nyman, with Marie Angel
