= Acoustic Accordions =

Studio album by Michael Nyman
- Released: 26 June 2010 (UK); May 11, 2011 (USA)
- Recorded: 30 August – 2 September 2009
- Genre: Contemporary classical, minimalism, film music
- Length: 46:44
- Label: MN Records
- Producer: Michael Nyman; Janusz Wojtarowicz

Michael Nyman chronology
The Glare (2009)	Acoustic Accordions (2010)

Acoustic Accordions is a 2010 album by Michael Nyman and Motion Trio featuring Nigel Barr. It contains covers of popular Michael Nyman tracks from Letters, Riddles and Writs, Drowning by Numbers, Prospero's Books, The Diary of Anne Frank, The Draughtsman's Contract, and The Piano, as well as an original track by Janusz Wojtarowicz, leader of Motion Trio, who also arranged the works for accordion.

"The Heart Asks Pleasure First" is Michael Nyman soloing at the piano. Motion Trio performs on all the other tracks, some accompanied by Nyman on piano and/or Barr on trombone and euphonium. All music was performed acoustically with no electronic enhancement.

The album is an outgrowth of a collaboration of the 7th Kinoteka Polish Film Festival with the support of the Polish Institute in London and financed by Adam Mickiewicz Institute as part of Polska! Year.
