= Acts of Beauty/Exit no Exit =

Acts of Beauty • Exit no Exit
- photograph by Michael Nyman design by Russell Mills and Michael Webster

Studio album by Michael Nyman
- Released: July 21, 2006 (UK); May 27, 2008 (United States)
- Recorded: 4 November 2004 (Acts of Beauty); 24 and 25 April 2006 (Exit no Exit)
- Studios: Officine Meccaniche, Milan (Acts of Beauty); Angel Studios, London (Exit no Exit)
- Genres: art song, contemporary classical, chamber music, minimalism
- Languages: Italian; English
- Label: MN Records
- Producer: Michael Nyman

Michael Nyman chronology
Six Celan Songs • The Ballad of Kastriot Rexhepi (2006)	Acts of Beauty • Exit no Exit (2006)	Nyman Brass (2006)

Professional ratings
Review scores
Source	Rating
The Guardian	3/5 stars
The Independent	4/5 stars
Sequenza 21	(mixed)

Acts of Beauty • Exit no Exit is the 55th album by Michael Nyman, the eighth on his own label, and the third of these to consist entirely of previously unrecorded work. He does not perform on the album, but composed and produced it. Acts of Beauty is a song cycle with texts by various writers commenting on the nature of art and beauty. It is performed by Cristina Zavalloni and Sentieri Selvaggi, conducted by Carlo Boccadoro. Exit no Exit was originally a vocal work for John Motson called Beckham Crosses, Nyman Scores, in tribute to the English association football team. Here, the vocal part is rewritten for bass clarinet, and played by Andrew Sparling of the Michael Nyman Band with the Nyman Quartet: Gabrielle Lester, Catherine Thompson, Kate Musker, and Tony Hinnigan.

== Acts of Beauty ==
Acts of Beauty features settings of material by Vincenzo Cartari, Kurt Schwitters, subject of Nyman's opera, Man and Boy: Dada, and Dziga Vertov, director of Man with a Movie Camera, a film he scored at the behest of the British Film Institute. "Marulla's Hobby" is about measuring erections.

== Track listing ==
1. "Due figliuole di un contadino" – 8:42
2. "Halt, we are specialists" – 6:02
3. "We are at a film studio" – 6:24
4. "Life's chaos" – 3:21
5. "Marulla's hobby" – 1:41
6. "Exit No Exit 1" – 1:02
7. "Exit No Exit 2" – 1:10
8. "Exit No Exit 3" – 1:40
9. "Exit No Exit 4" – 1:34
10. "Exit No Exit 5" – 1:24
11. "Exit No Exit 6" – 2:07
12. "Exit No Exit 7" – 1:17
13. "Exit No Exit 8" – 1:28
14. "Exit No Exit 9" – 1:29
15. "Exit No Exit 10" – 10:35
16. "Exit No Exit 11" – 1:02
