= Prospero's Books =

1991 British film by Peter Greenaway

- US Theatrical release poster
- Directed by: Peter Greenaway
- Written by: Peter Greenaway
- Produced by: Masato Hara; Kees Kasander; Katsufumi Nakamura; Yoshinobu Namano; Denis Wigman; Roland Wigman
- Starring: John Gielgud; Michael Clark; Isabelle Pasco; Michel Blanc; Erland Josephson; Tom Bell; Kenneth Cranham; Mark Rylance; Jim VD Woude; Gerard Thoolen; Pierre Bokma
- Cinematography: Sacha Vierny
- Edited by: Marina Bodbijl
- Music by: Michael Nyman
- Distributed by: Palace Pictures
- Release dates: 30 August 1991 (United Kingdom); 15 November 1991 (United States; limited); 6 December 1991 (Australia)
- Running time: 126 minutes
- Countries: United Kingdom; Netherlands; France; Italy; Japan
- Language: English
- Budget: £1.5–2.4 million
- Box office: £1.6 million

Prospero's Books is a 1991 British avant-garde film adaptation of William Shakespeare's The Tempest, written and directed by Peter Greenaway. Sir John Gielgud plays Prospero, the protagonist who provides the off-screen narration and the voices to the other story characters. As noted by Peter Conrad in The New York Times on 17 November 1991, Greenaway intended the film “as an homage to the actor and to his 'mastery of illusion.' In the film, Prospero is Shakespeare, and having rehearsed the action inside his head, speaking the lines of all the other characters, he concludes the film by sitting down to write The Tempest.”

Stylistically, Prospero's Books is narratively and cinematically innovative in its techniques, combining mime, dance, opera, and animation. About a tenth of the movie was made on Japanese high definition television (HDTV). Edited in Japan, it makes extensive use of digital image manipulation (using Hi-Vision video inserts and the Quantel Paintbox system), often overlaying multiple moving and still pictures with animations. Michael Nyman composed the musical score and Karine Saporta choreographed the dance. The film is also notable for its extensive use of nudity, reminiscent of Renaissance paintings of mythological characters. The nude actors and extras represent a cross-section of male and female humanity.

== Plot ==
Prospero's Books is a complex tale based upon William Shakespeare's The Tempest. Miranda, the daughter of Prospero, an exiled magician, falls in love with Ferdinand, the son of his enemy; while the sorcerer's sprite, Ariel, convinces him to abandon revenge against the traitors from his earlier life. In the film, Prospero is Shakespeare himself, conceiving, designing, rehearsing, directing and performing the story's action as it unfolds and in the end, sitting down to write the completed work. Greenaway calls the film "basically a soliloquy of one man in an artificial world."

Ariel is played by four actors: three acrobats—a boy, an adolescent, and a youth—and a boy singer. Each represents a classical elemental.

== The Books ==
The books of Prospero number 24, according to the production design, which outlines each volume's content. The list is reminiscent of the lost books of Epicurus.

1. A Book of Water
2. A Book of Mirrors
3. A Book of Mythologies
4. A Primer of the Small Stars
5. An Atlas Belonging to Orpheus
6. A Harsh Book of Geometry
7. The Book of Colours
8. The Vesalius Anatomy of Birth
9. An Alphabetical Inventory of the Dead
10. A Book of Travellers' Tales
11. The Book of the Earth
12. A Book of Architecture and Other Music
13. The Ninety-Two Conceits of the Minotaur
14. The Book of Languages
15. End-plants
16. A Book of Love
17. A Bestiary of Past, Present and Future Animals
18. The Book of Utopias
19. The Book of Universal Cosmography
20. Lore of Ruins
21. The Autobiographies of Pasiphae and Semiramis
22. A Book of Motion
23. The Book of Games
24. Thirty-Six Plays

== Cast ==
- Sir John Gielgud as Prospero
- Michael Clark as Caliban
- Michel Blanc as Alonso
- Erland Josephson as Gonzalo
- Isabelle Pasco as Miranda
- Tom Bell as Antonio
- Kenneth Cranham as Sebastian
- Mark Rylance as Ferdinand
- Gerard Thoolen as Adrian
- Pierre Bokma as Francisco
- Jim van der Woude as Trinculo
- Michiel Romeyn as Stephano
- Paul Russell as Ariel
- James Thiérrée as Ariel
- Leonard Maguire as the Narrator

== Production and financing ==
Gielgud is quoted as saying that a film of The Tempest (with him as Prospero) was his life's ambition, as he had been in four stage productions in 1931, 1940, 1957, and 1974. He had approached Alain Resnais, Ingmar Bergman, Akira Kurosawa, and Orson Welles about directing him in it, with Benjamin Britten to compose its score, and Albert Finney as Caliban, before Greenaway agreed. The closest earlier attempts came to being made was in 1967, with Welles both directing and playing Caliban. But after the commercial failure of their film collaboration, Chimes at Midnight, financing for a cinematic Tempest collapsed.

"I don't know whether Greenaway ever saw me in it on stage, I didn't dare to ask him," Sir John told Conrad, who noted that the actor recalls his previous Prosperos in the book Shakespeare -- Hit or Miss?: “At the Old Vic in the 1930s he played the character as 'Dante without a beard'; in 1957 for Peter Brook he was 'an El Greco hermit', disheveled and decrepit; in 1974 for Peter Hall he was a bespectacled magus; now, for Mr. Greenaway, in a film that is a blitz of cultural icons, he is Renaissance man, exercising a universal power through the volumes in his library but confounded by his own sorry mortality.”

“I was glad I knew the part so well, because there was so much going on in the studio to distract me,” Sir John recalled, “I had to parade up and down wearing that cloak which needed four people to lift, and with papers flying in my face all the time. And it was terribly cold in the bath." Sir John spent four frigid days during the winter naked in a swimming pool, to choreograph the shipwreck with which the film begins.

Greenaway said “Keeping budgets low ... allows me to maintain control”. Prospero's Books had a reported budget of "roughly [US] $3 million." (Note: Roughly the same as stated in the infobox.) Greenaway praised one of the producers, Kees Kasander, saying he catered to Greenaway's unconventional requests and "never censor[ed]".

The film was screened out of competition at the 1991 Cannes Film Festival.

The film uses layered, detailed imagery. Here, a procession of gift-givers (walking right to left) present gifts to a couple in love. A close-up of each gift is inset and overlaid in the middle 80% of the frame. Actors are in varying amounts and styles of dress.

== Reception ==
Several critics noted the pervasive nudity of Prospero's Books.

Summary of Criticism

'Too much Greenaway, not enough Shakespeare.' Or that I’ve ‘MTVed’ Shakespeare. A lot of people complained that I did not pursue the nature vs. nurture themes of the play. Some thought I underplayed the themes of power and politics. I have demeaned the original by not following all those well-worn trenches of Shakespearean scholarship.

— Peter Greenaway

In his 17 November 1991 article for The New York Times, Peter Conrad observed “...the performance is also a revelation of Sir John himself: simultaneously noble and naughty, a high priest and a joker, contemplating at the end of a long life the value of the art he practices.”

Aggregator Rotten Tomatoes reports a 62% approval of Prospero's Books, with an average rating of 5.9/10 from 26 reviews and a critical consensus that reads: "There is no middle ground for viewers of Peter Greenaway's work, but for his fans, Prospero's Books is reliably daring." Roger Ebert gave the work three stars out of four and argued, "Most of the reviews of this film have missed the point; this is not a narrative, it need not make sense, and it is not 'too difficult' because it could not have been any less so. It is simply a work of original art, which Greenaway asks us to accept or reject on his own terms."

Douglas M. Lanier argues that nudity is used in service of making the human body a "medium" distinguishing Prospero's Books from the textuality of Shakespeare's work. Most of the nudity is embodied by the spirits that Prospero controls, implying thematic significance.

=== Box office ===
The film grossed £579,487 at the UK box office. In the United States and Canada, where it was distributed by Miramax Films, it grossed $1.75 million (£1 million).

== Soundtrack ==
This was the last of the collaborations between director Peter Greenaway and composer Michael Nyman. Most of the film's music cues, (excepting Ariel's songs and the Masque) are from an earlier concert, La Traversée de Paris and the score from A Zed & Two Noughts. The soundtrack album is Nyman's sixteenth release.

=== Track listing ===
1. Full fathom five* – 1:58
2. Prospero's curse – 2:38
3. While you here do snoring lie* – 1:06
4. Prospero's Magic – 5:11
5. Miranda – 3:54
6. Twelve years since – 2:45
7. Come unto these yellow sands* – 3:44
8. History of Sycorax – 3:25
9. Come and go* – 1:16
10. Cornfield – 6:26
11. Where the bee sucks* – 4:48
12. Caliban's pit – 2:56
13. Reconciliation – 2:31
14. THE MASQUE+ – 12:12

=== Performers ===
- Sarah Leonard, Ariel*
- Marie Angel, Iris+
- Ute Lemper, Ceres+
- Deborah Conway, Juno+

=== Michael Nyman Band ===
- Alexander Balanescu, violin
- Jonathan Carney, violin, viola
- Elisabeth Perry, violin
- Clare Connors, violin
- Kate Musker, viola
- Tony Hinnigan, cello
- Justin Pearson, cello
- Paul Morgan, double bass
- Tim Amhurst, double bass
- Lynda Houghton, double bass
- Martin Elliott, bass guitar
- David Rix, clarinet, bass clarinet
- John Harle, soprano & alto saxophone
- David Roach, soprano & alto saxophone
- Jamie Talbot, soprano & alto saxophone
- Andrew Findon, tenor & baritone saxophone, piccolo, flute
- Graham Ashton, trumpet
- Richard Clews, horn
- Marjorie Dunn, horn
- Nigel Barr, bass trombone
- Steve Saunders, bass trombone
- Michael Nyman, piano & musical direction

Prospero's Books
- Photos by Marc Guillaumont; Design: Creative Partnership

Soundtrack album by Michael Nyman
- Released: 12 November 1991
- Recorded: PRT Studios and Abbey Road Studios, London
- Genre: Soundtrack, Contemporary classical, art song, Minimalist music
- Length: 54:58
- Language: English
- Label: London; Argo
- Producer: David Cunningham

Michael Nyman chronology
String Quartets 1-3 (1991)	Prospero's Books (1991)	The Michael Nyman Songbook (1992)

Professional ratings
Review scores
Source	Rating
Allmusic	link

=== Technical ===
- Produced by David Cunningham
- Engineer: Michael J. Dutton
- Assistant engineer: Dillon Gallagher (PRT), Chris Brown (Abbey Road Studios)
- Mixed by Michael J. Dutton, Michael Nyman, and David Cunningham at PRT Studios and Abbey Road Studios
- Edited at Abbey Road Studios by Peter Mew
- Art Direction: Ann Bradbeer
- Photography: Marc Guillamot
- Design: Creative Partnership
- Artist representative: Don Mousseau
