= Memorial (Nyman) =

Memorial is an epic funeral march-like piece, composed by Michael Nyman around 1984–1985. The work premiered on 15 June 1985. It was written to commemorate the deaths of 39 fans, almost all Italian, at the 1985 European Cup final between Liverpool and Juventus at the Heysel Stadium (also known as the Heysel Stadium disaster). The whole piece was performed just once. In 1989, Nyman began "reassigning" elements of Memorial, as he often does with earlier work. The first appearance on a commercial recording was of the fifth movement, on the soundtrack of The Cook, the Thief, His Wife & Her Lover. The piece incorporates and builds on a musical sequence from "What Power Art Thou”, an aria from the opera King Arthur by Henry Purcell.

Michael Nyman also mentioned that Memorial was built upon a piece of his soundtrack for Peter Greenaway's film A Zed and Two Noughts titled Time Lapse.

== Releases ==
The fifth movement appeared in The Cook, the Thief, His Wife & Her Lover, and re-recorded versions appear on Michael Nyman Band's The Essential Michael Nyman Band and The Composer's Cut Series Vol. II: Nyman/Greenaway Revisited. After Extra Time and The Very Best of Michael Nyman: Film Music 1980-2001 are reissues of the Essential and soundtrack versions, respectively. The sixth movement has been released on compact disc under the title "Images Were Introduced" on the album The Kiss and Other Movements. The second and fourth appear on the limited edition album, La Traversée de Paris. The other movements remain unreleased, and Nyman has described the work as "dismantled."
