= Trio La Milpa =

American contemporary oboe trio

Trio La Milpa was an oboe trio formed by Katherine Needleman, Michael Lisicky, and Sandra Gerster. Trio La Milpa was formed in Richmond, Virginia in 2002, and was based in Baltimore, Maryland where Needleman and Lisicky are members of the Baltimore Symphony Orchestra. Trio La Milpa was widely regarded as the most well known current performer of the oboe trio repertoire in the World. This repertoire was popularized by Beethoven but numerous other works have also been transposed for oboe trio. In 2007 Trio La Milpa was the first American classical music group to tour Greenland where they played several performances to capacity crowds in the capital city of Nuuk as well as Sisimiut.
