= Katherine Needleman =

American musician (born 1978)

Katherine Needleman (born May 14, 1978) is the American principal oboist of the Baltimore Symphony Orchestra since 2003 and a professor of oboe at the Curtis Institute of Music since 2022.

== Career ==
She is a graduate of the Baltimore School for the Arts and later studied under Richard Woodhams at the Curtis Institute of Music in Philadelphia, graduating at the age of 20. She was the first prize winner of the Gillet-Fox International Oboe Competition of the International Double Reed Society in 2003. Needleman served on the oboe faculty of the Peabody Institute of Johns Hopkins University from 2005 to 2020. In addition to playing in the Baltimore Symphony, Needleman is one of the founding members of Mico Nonet as well as Trio La Milpa.

In 2019, she filed a harassment and discrimination complaint against concertmaster Jonathan Carney. The orchestra hired an independent investigator, and the investigation concluded there was no hostile work environment.

Needleman was appointed to the oboe faculty at the Curtis Institute of Music in 2022, succeeding her teacher Richard Woodhams.
