= Kathryn Stott =

English pianist

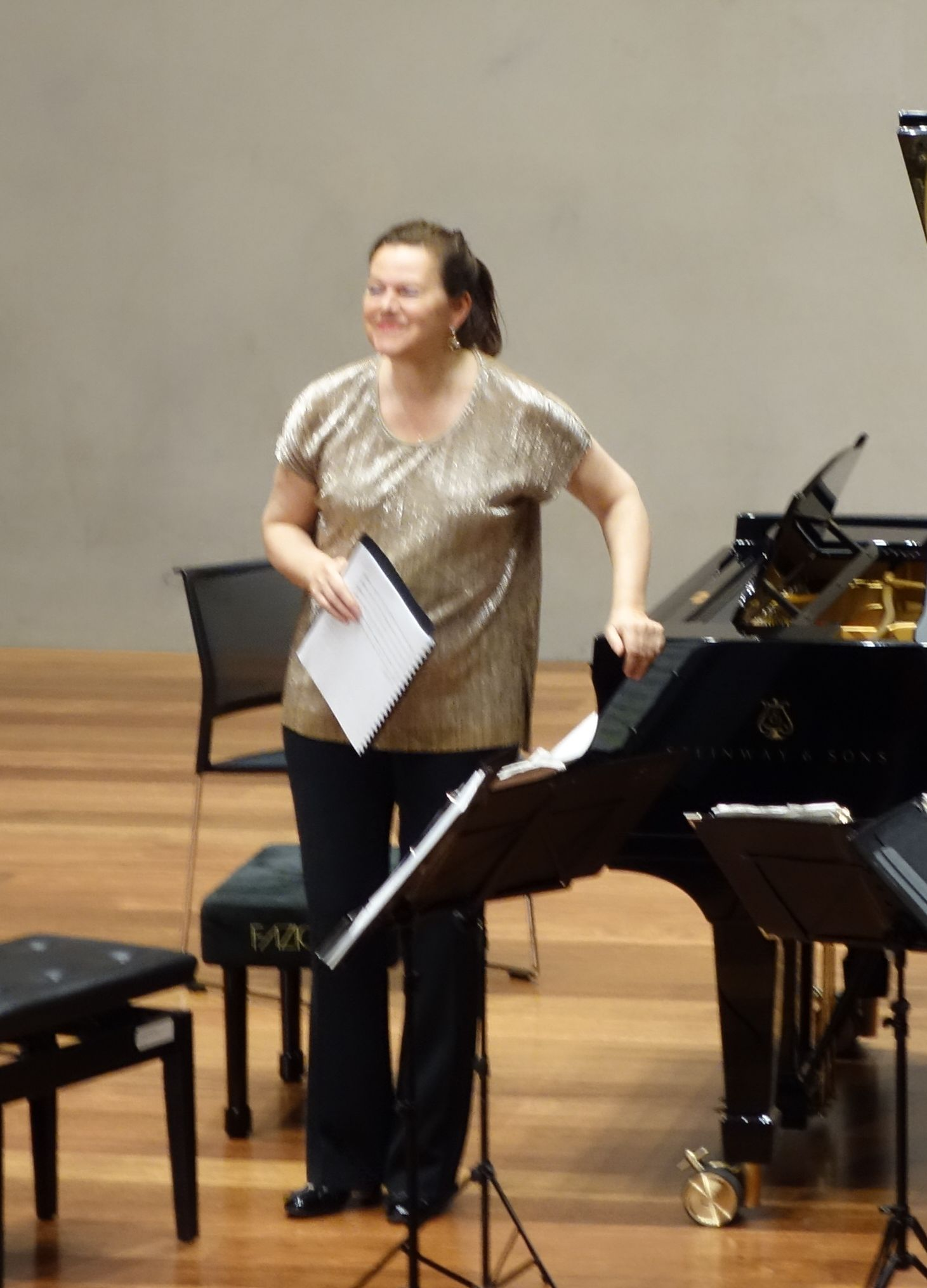
Image of Kathryn Stott

Kathryn Stott (born 10 December 1958) is an English classical pianist who performs as a concerto soloist, recitalist and chamber musician. Her specialities include the English and French classical repertoire, contemporary classical music and the tango. She is a professor at the Royal Northern College of Music, Manchester and has organised several music festivals and concert series.

Grove Music Online describes Stott's playing as "marked by a vivid sense of immediacy and personal communication." A review of her fiftieth birthday gala concert in The Times describes her as "one of the most versatile pianists on the circuit".

== Early life and education ==
Stott was born in Nelson, Lancashire. Her mother was a piano teacher and she began to learn the piano at the age of five. She attended the Yehudi Menuhin School, where her teachers included Nadia Boulanger, Marcel Ciampi, and Vlado Perlemuter. She then studied at the Royal College of Music with Kendall Taylor.

== Performance and recording career ==
Stott's career as a soloist was launched after she gained fifth place in the Leeds International Piano Competition in 1978. Her London début was at the Purcell Room the same year. She has since toured throughout Europe, Asia, America and Australia with a concert repertoire that encompasses concertos, solo piano music and chamber music. She is unusual in always performing from a score. Her output for the BBC over the years has been vast, performing not only in solo recital but also with all the BBC orchestras including 10 'Proms' at the Royal Albert Hall.

Stott has a particular affinity with English music and a keen interest in contemporary music with many works written especially for her. Her series of recordings of works by Frank Bridge, George Lloyd, John Ireland and William Walton is described as "distinguished" in Grove. She is also known for her love of French music, particularly the works of Gabriel Fauré, whose complete piano works she has recorded to critical acclaim. Contemporary classical music is another of Stott's specialities. She has given the first performances of many works, including a concerto by Sir Peter Maxwell Davies, Michael Nyman's The Piano Concerto and Graham Fitkin's Circuit (with Noriko Ogawa). Her close musical relationship with Fitkin has led to 8 World premieres. Since the mid-1990s, she has also been interested in tango and other Latin dance music, which she describes as "primitive music, hard to place, both abrasive and tender".

Stott first met her long-time collaborator, the noted American cellist Yo-Yo Ma, in 1978 when she "discovered a Chinese man playing the cello" in her flat after returning from holiday. (Ma had rented the flat from Stott's flat-mate, violinist Nigel Kennedy, without realising that it was shared.) Stott and Ma have worked together since 1985; the pair frequently tours together and has made several joint recordings, including Soul of the Tango and Obrigado Brazil, which received Grammy Awards in 1999 and 2004. In 2020, Stott curated their album Songs of Comfort and Hope as a musical response to the impact of the pandemic. She also has long-standing collaborations with cellist Christian Poltéra, trumpeter Tine Thing Helseth and pianist Noriko Ogawa.

== Artistic direction ==
Stott has been the artistic director of several major festivals and concert series. In 1995 she organised a Fauré festival in Manchester to mark the composer's 150th anniversary. According to the Independent, the event was "transformed by her enthusiasm and her own sumptuous performances of this neglected composer's works." The success of the festival led to her appointment as Chevalier dans l'Ordre des Arts et des Lettres by the French government.

She directed two major piano festivals at the Bridgewater Hall, Manchester in 2000 and 2003, establishing her reputation as an astute programmer. As Stott considers "It's very important at an event like this that we should let people play", both festivals featured Steinway grand pianos that the public were allowed to try, as well as a variety of novelty pianos including a red "Ferrari" Steinway, an "exploded" piano revealing the internal workings, a grove of woven pianos, and a concert grand fitted with a pool which played a variety of watery sounds.

In 1998, Stott directed a concert series "Out of the Shadows" with the Royal Liverpool Philharmonic, featuring two neglected female composers, Clara Schumann and Fanny Mendelssohn. She also directed the series "Chopin: The Music and the Legacy" at Leeds College of Music (2004–05) and "Paris" at the Sheffield Crucible (2006). She was appointed as musical director of the Manchester Chamber Concerts Society (2009–14) and was Guest Artistic Director of Incontri in Terra di Siena in 2010 and 2011. Kathryn curated two concert series for Leeds International Concerts and relished her role as Artistic Director of the Australian Festival of Chamber Music 2018-20. Her work here involved programming over 100 works each festival, instigating commissions and bringing together 45 musicians from Australia and the international community.

== Teaching ==
Kathryn Stott is professor at the Royal Northern College of Music in Manchester.

== Also ==
Kathryn Stott lives in Manchester, has a daughter, Lucy, and enjoys being in the countryside with her working cocker spaniel, Archie. www.kathrynstott.com

== Partial discography ==
Most recent recordings include:

2020 Songs of Comfort and Hope Various Yo-Yo Ma SONY Classical 19439822372

2020 Schumann and Brahms Christian Poltera BIS 2167

2015 Arc of Life Bach, Debussy, Sollima Yo-Yo Ma SONY 8875-10316-2

2015 Solitaires Ravel, Messiaen etc BIS 2148

2013 Tine Various Tine Thing-Helseth EMI 50999 416471 2

2013 Barber Cello Concerto Christian Poltera BIS 1827

2012 Korngold Piano Quintet Doric String Quartet CHAN 10707

Year	Title	Composer(s)	Other performers	Record company	Reference
SOLO PIANO	Favourite Nocturnes	Chopin		Regis	Regis RRC 1159
1987	A Debussy Collection	Debussy		Conifer Classics	CFC/CDCF 148
1993	A Liszt Collection	Liszt		Conifer Classics	CDCF 180
1994	The Complete Music for Piano	Fauré		Hyperion	Hyperion CDA 66911/4
1994	Complete Nocturnes	Chopin		Regis	Regis RCC 2034
1999	Essays in the Modes, Music-Pictures Groups VI, VII, Variazioni ed Improvvisati su un Tema Originale, English Tune with Burden, Egoistic (Mode V L), April – England	Foulds		BIS	BIS-CD-933
2001	Piano Moods	Debussy, Liszt, Chopin, Ravel, Rachmaninov, and others	Various	Conifer Classics	BMG7560551286-2
2002	Piano Works including the Pièces pittoresques	Chabrier	Elizabeth Burley (piano)	Regis	Regis RRC 1133
2003	Suite dansante en jazz, Piano Sonata No. 1, Cinq études de jazz, Second Suite for piano, 11 Inventions, Hot Music	Schulhoff		BIS	BIS-CD-1249
2003	Les Heures Persanes	Koechlin		Chandos	CHAN 9974
2007	Dreams, The Curious One, Concert Étude in C major, On the Sea Shore – a memory, Fantasia on Czech Folksongs, Czech Dances, Books 1,2	Smetana		Chandos	CHAN 10430
2008	Dance	Chopin, Villa-Lobos, Piazzolla, Satie, Tchaikovsky, Shostakovich, Ginastera, Bartók, Dvořák, Sibelius, Guarnieri, Lecuona		Chandos	CHAN 10493
Piano duos
2003	On Hearing the First Cuckoo in Spring, Summer Night on the River, In Summer Garden, A Song before Sunrise, North Country Sketches, Dance Rhapsody Nos 1,2	Delius arr. Warlock	Noriko Ogawa (piano)	BIS	BIS-CD-1347
2003	Sir Lennox Berkeley: A Centenary Tribute: Sonatina for Piano Duet, Palm Court Waltz, and others	Berkeley	Nash Ensemble	Helios	Helios CDH55135
Piano concertos
1989	Piano Concerto No. 4	Lloyd	London Symphony Orchestra, George Lloyd (conductor)	Albany	AR004
1990	Piano Concerto No. 3	Lloyd	BBC Philharmonic, George Lloyd (conductor)	Albany	TROY019
1991	The Rio Grande, Concerto for Piano and Nine Players, Horoscope	Lambert	Delia Jones, BBC Singers, BBC Concert Orchestra, Barry Wordsworth (conductor)	Decca	Decca 473 424–2
1994	The Piano Concerto	Nyman	Royal Liverpool Philharmonic, Michael Nyman (conductor)	Argo	Decca 443 382–2
1995	Orchestral Works: Ballade in F sharp, piano and orchestra, and others	Fauré	BBC Philharmonic, Yan Pascal Tortelier	Chandos	CHAN9416W
2002	Collected Works: Sinfonia Concertante	Walton	Royal Philharmonic Orchestra, Vernon Handley (conductor)	RCA Red Seal	BMG RCA 74321 92575 2
2003	Concertos for Piano and Orchestra Nos 2, 3, The Comedians	Kabalevsky	BBC Philharmonic, Vassily Sinaisky (conductor)	Chandos	CHAN 10052
2005	Concertos & Dances: Piano Concerto No 2 in C minor	Howells	Royal Liverpool Philharmonic, Vernon Handley (conductor)	Helios	CDH55205
2006	Concertos for Piano and Orchestra Nos. 1, 4, Symphony No. 2	Kabalevsky	BBC Philharmonic, Neeme Järvi (conductor)	Chandos	CHAN 10384
Chamber works
1997	Soul of the Tango	Piazzolla	Yo-Yo Ma (cello) and others	Sony BMG	Sony SK SK63122
1997	Sonata No.1 in E minor for Violin and Piano, Sonata No.2 in E minor for Violin and Piano, Bagatellen	Busoni	Per Enoksson (violin)	BIS	BIS-CD-784
2000	Sonatas for Violin and Piano Nos 1,2, Zwei lyrische Stücke, Poème pour violon et piano	Sjögren	Per Enoksson (violin)	BIS	BIS-CD-995
2002	Le Saxophone Lumineux: 15 Etudes for Saxophone and Piano, 7 Pieces for Saxophone and Piano	Koechlin	Federico Mondelci (saxophone)	Chandos	CHAN 9803
2003	Paris – La Belle Époque	Fauré, Franck, Massenet, Saint-Saëns	Yo-Yo Ma (cello)	Sony BMG	Sony SK 87287
2004	Obrigado Brazil	Guarnieri, Gismonti, Villa-Lobos and others	Yo-Yo Ma (cello) and others	Sony BMG	Sony SK 89935
2007	String Quintet in G major, Piano Quintet No. 2 in A major	Dvořák	Škampa Quartet	Supraphon	SU 3909-2 131
2007	Sonata for Cello and Piano, Sonatina for Cello and Piano, and others	Honegger	Christian Poltéra (cello)	BIS	BIS-CD-1617
2007	Nocturne	Chopin	Truls Mørk (cello)	Virgin	NRK P2
2008	Ballade for Cello and Piano, Preludes for Piano	Martin	Christian Poltéra (cello)	BIS	BIS-CD-1637
2008	Sonatas for Cello and Piano Nos 1,2, Nocturne No. 13, Trio for Piano, Violin and Cello	Fauré	Christian Poltéra (cello), Priya Mitchell (violin)	Chandos	CHAN 10447
2009	Sonatas for Cello and Piano Nos 1, 2, Prière op.158, Le Cygne, Romance op. 36	Saint-Saëns	Christian Poltéra (cello)	Chandos	CHAN 10552
2010	Milo	Bridge, Turnage	Guy Johnston	ORC	100010
2010	Circuit	Fitkin	Noriko Ogawa	BIS	1517
2012	Silent Woods	Dvorak	Christian Poltera	BIS	2167
