= The Tyburn Tree (Dark London) =

Studio album by Marc Almond and John Harle
- Released: 24 February 2014
- Recorded: Old Malthouse Studios, Yellowfish Studios
- Genre: Progressive rock, jazz, folk, classical
- Length: 53:50
- Label: Sospiro Noir
- Producer: John Harle

Marc Almond chronology
Feasting with Panthers (2011)	The Tyburn Tree (Dark London) (2014)	The Dancing Marquis (2014)

John Harle chronology
Art Music (2013)	The Tyburn Tree (Dark London) (2014)

The Tyburn Tree (Dark London) is the seventeenth solo studio album by the British singer/songwriter Marc Almond. The album is a collaboration with the composer John Harle and was released on Harle's Sospiro Noir label on 24 February 2014.

== Background ==
The Tyburn Tree (Dark London) is a song cycle about "the macabre, supernatural history of the loved and reviled city" of London and is named after the famous Tyburn Tree gallows where many criminals were hanged. Almond and Harle had worked together before on the latter's 2013 album Art Music, introducing Harle to what Record Collector calls "a simpatico and invaluable collaborator" in Almond. According to the Daily Express, the album was two years in the making and features a range of musical styles, "from electronic dance to ambient music and classical".

The album was released in a jewel case CD edition as well as a gatefold double vinyl edition with sleeve notes describing the backgrounds of the songs.

== Critical reception ==
Professional ratings
Review scores
Source	Rating
The Observer	3/5 stars
The Guardian	4/5 stars
The Arts Desk	4/5 stars
Financial Times	4/5 stars
Record Collector	4/5 stars
The Independent	3/5 stars

The album received positive reviews overall from critics. The union of Almond and Harle is called "a powerfully theatrical alliance" by The Independent who compare songs on the album to both King Crimson and Scott Walker. Record Collector calls the album a "high-minded undertaking", praising both "the emotional breadth of Almond's compelling, immersive performances" and Harle's "consistently expansive and imaginative" musical settings. Joe Muggs for The Arts Desk writes that The Tyburn Tree (Dark London) "should by rights be really hard work" due to the many styles of music used but concludes that "like everything else in Almond's career, it's quite uncanny and unlikely that he carries it off – but he does." The Observer calls the album "dark but dashing" and writes that "the echoing, crepuscular atmosphere is dominated by Almond's impressive neo-operatic singing". Jazz critic John Fordham writes in The Guardian that though "the music is often atmospherically layered and coloured" it is also "a shade self-important and overpacked". He concludes that "the composer's echoing soprano sax is always haunting, as is Sarah Leonard's eerie, soprano-meets-chorister voice, and the searing Almond is magnificent all through".

== Track listing ==
1. "The Tyburn Tree" (Marc Almond, John Harle) – 2:53
2. "Fortress" (lyrics by William Blake, adapted by Harle) – 4:19
  - adapted from the works of William Blake
3. "Spring Heeled Jack" (lyrics by Almond, Harle) – 4:29
4. "My Fair Lady" (lyrics by Tom Pickard, Harle) – 4:59
5. "Ratcliffe Highway" (lyrics trad., adapted by Almond, Harle) – 4:15
6. "The Labyrinth of Limehouse" (lyrics by Almond, Harle) – 4:12
7. "To the Crow the Spoils" (lyrics by Iain Sinclair, Harle) – 3:22
8. "Dark Angel" (lyrics by John Dee, Harle) – 4:45
  - adapted from the manuscript "A True and Faithful RELATION of what passed for many Yeers between Dr. John Dee and some spirits" by John Dee.
9. "The Vampire of Highgate" (lyrics by Almond, Harle) – 4:17
10. "Black Widow" (lyrics by Pickard, Harle) – 4:26
11. "Poor Henry" (lyrics by Almond, Harle) – 5:16
12. "Jerusalem" (lyrics by Blake, adapted by Harle) – 6:39
  - adapted from the works of William Blake

== Personnel ==
- Marc Almond – vocals
- John Harle – keyboards, saxophones, vocals
- Sarah Leonard – vocals
- Neill MacColl – acoustic guitar
- John Parricelli – electric guitar
- Mike Lovatt – trumpet
- Dudley Phillips – bass
- Martyn Barker – drums
- Iain Sinclair – voice (track 7)
- Daniel Eisner Harle – sound design
