= Letters, Riddles and Writs =

Letters, Riddles and Writs is a one act opera for television by Michael Nyman broadcast in 1991. The story is devised by Nyman, with a libretto by Jeremy Newson and Pat Gavin that incorporates Emily Anderson's English translations of correspondence and other texts by Wolfgang Amadeus Mozart, the subject of the opera.

The opera premiered on the BBC television miniseries, Not Mozart, directed by Newson and Gavin. Ute Lemper played the role of Mozart. Nyman appears as a court pianist instructed to play an "offending extract" of the String Quartet in E flat major, K. 428 when Joseph Haydn (Julian Glover) accuses Mozart of musical plagiarism in court, and Mozart complains that Nyman has slowed down his chords. This section of the opera is an opera buffa-style interlude. The majority of the opera is more serious. Extracts of the opera are featured on The Michael Nyman Songbook and Mozart 252.

The film also features David Thomas (bass-baritone) as Leopold Mozart and Tony Rohr as Ludwig van Beethoven.
