= MGV (composition) =

MGV, or Musique à Grande Vitesse is a 1993 musical composition by English composer Michael Nyman. Its title, which is French for "High-Speed Music", indicates its origin as a work commissioned by the Festival de Lille for the inauguration of the TGV LGV Nord line between Paris and Lille. It was first performed by the Michael Nyman Band and the Orchestre national de Lille under Jean-Claude Casadesus on 26 September 1993.

== Background ==
From the programme note by the composer: "MGV runs continuously but was conceived as an abstract, imaginary journey; or rather five inter-connected journeys, each ending with a slow, mainly stepwise melody which is only heard in its 'genuine' form when the piece reaches its destination. The thematic 'transformation' is a key to MGV as a whole, where musical ideas- rhythmic, melodic, harmonic, motivic, textural - constantly change their identity as they pass through different musical 'environments'. For instance the opening bars establish both a recurrent rhythmic principle - 9, 11, or 13-beat rhythmic cycles heard against a regular 8 - and a harmonic process - chord sequences (mainly over C and E) which have the note E in common. (Coincidentally, MGV begins in C and ends in E). A later scalic, syncopated figure (again first heard over C, E and A) begins the second section, featuring brass, in D flat. And so on: the topography of MGV should be experienced without reference to planning, description or timetables. Tempo changes, unpredictable slowings down, bear no logical relation to the high speed of the Paris-Lille journey, while the temptation to treat MGV as a concerto grosso, with the Michael Nyman band as the ripieno, was resisted: more suitably the Band (amplified in live performance) lays down the tracks on which MGV runs."

== Recording history and popular culture ==
MGV was presented on The Piano Concerto/MGV by Argo Records, released in 1994. This remains the only commercial recording.

A rearranged excerpt from the start of "1st Region" was featured in an influential Sony Wega television ad campaign in 1995. The same movement is featured in the soundtrack to The Last Black Man in San Francisco, the 2019 debut of director Joe Talbot.
