= Marie Angel (soprano) =

Australian opera singer

Marie Angel (b. Pinnaroo, South Australia, Australia, 3 June 1953) is an Australian opera singer. She sings both operas in the standard repertoire as well as contemporary operas by such composers as Mauricio Kagel, Bruno Maderna, Michael Tippett, Harrison Birtwistle, Philip Glass, Louis Andriessen, Michael Nyman, Bernd Alois Zimmermann, and John Cage.

She appeared in the Peter Greenaway film Prospero's Books, as well as in the recording of Michael Nyman's opera Facing Goya.
