= The Hairdresser's Husband =

- French theatrical release poster
- Directed by: Patrice Leconte
- Written by: Patrice Leconte; Claude Klotz
- Produced by: Thierry de Ganay
- Starring: Jean Rochefort; Anna Galiena
- Cinematography: Eduardo Serra
- Edited by: Joëlle Hache
- Music by: Michael Nyman
- Distributed by: AMLF
- Release date: 3 October 1990
- Running time: 82 minutes
- Country: France
- Language: French
- Box office: $2.71 million

The Hairdresser's Husband (French: Le Mari de la coiffeuse) is a 1990 French comedy-drama film written by Patrice Leconte and Claude Klotz, and directed by Leconte. Jean Rochefort stars as the title character.

The film received the Prix Louis Delluc. In 1991 it was nominated for "Best Foreign-Language Film" in the British Academy Film Awards.

== Synopsis ==
The film begins with a flashback from the titular character, Antoine. We are introduced to his fixation with female hairdressers which began at a young age. The film uses flashbacks throughout and there are frequent parallels drawn with the past. Though Antoine tells Mathilde that "the past is dead", his life is evidence that on some level the past repeats itself. As a young boy he fantasised about a hairdresser who died by suicide and as a man in his 50s he begins an affair with a hairdresser which ends after ten years in her suicide. However, there are differences: Mathilde dies by suicide because she is so happy she is afraid of the happiness she has found with Antoine ending.

As an adult, Antoine fulfils his childhood ambition of marrying a hairdresser, Mathilde and the two form an close and loving relationship. In the final scene Antoine, dances to Eastern music in her Salon, just as he has done since childhood. The film finish with Antoine saying that the hairdresser will return.

== Cast ==
- Jean Rochefort as Antoine
- Anna Galiena as Mathilde
- Roland Bertin as Antoine's father
- Maurice Chevit as Ambroise Dupré dit Isidore Agopian
- Jacques Mathou as Mr. Chardon
- Philippe Clévenot as Morvoisieux
- Anne-Marie Pisani as Madame Shaeffer
- Albert Delpy as Donecker
- Michèle Laroque as Adopted Child's Mother

== Reception ==
The film received the 1990 Prix Louis Delluc, which it shared with Le Petit Criminel by Jacques Doillon. American film critic Roger Ebert added this to his "Great Movies" list on January 27, 2010. The film was nominated for the Grand Prix of the Belgian Syndicate of Cinema Critics.

== Home media ==
The Hairdresser's Husband was released on DVD by Umbrella Entertainment in April 2011. The DVD is compatible region code 4.

== Soundtrack ==
The Hairdresser's Husband

Soundtrack album by Michael Nyman
- Released: September 21, 1992
- Genre: Middle Eastern
- Label: Soundtrack Listeners Communications

Michael Nyman chronology
The Michael Nyman Songbook (1992)	The Hairdresser's Husband (1992)	The Essential Michael Nyman Band (1992)

The soundtrack was composed by Michael Nyman and also contains a great deal of Middle Eastern popular music. It was first released as an album in Japan by Soundtrack Listeners Communications (SLC) September 21, 1992, and has subsequently been released elsewhere.

== Legacy ==
Spanish singer Pedro Guerra composed a song based on the film for his debut album, Golosinas (1995), which shares the film's title. Guerra and Bebe reinterpreted the song in 2009 to promote her album Y.
