= Mayumi Seiler =

Canadian-Austrian violinist (born 1963)

Mayumi Seiler (born November 14, 1963) is a Canadian-Austrian violinist of Japanese and German heritage, born in Osaka, Japan.

== Education and career ==
Having started to learn the violin from the age of three, Seiler studied music at the Mozarteum University Salzburg.

Seiler is the artistic director and founder of Via Salzburg Chamber Music, a Toronto-based chamber music organization. She teaches at The Glenn Gould School.

Seiler has performed with conductors including Neville Marriner, Christopher Hogwood, Peter Oundjian, and Sándor Végh, and has been a soloist with orchestras such as the City of London Sinfonia, the Royal Philharmonic Orchestra, the Berlin Symphony, the Moscow Symphony Orchestra, the Hong Kong Philharmonic Orchestra, the Australian Chamber Orchestra, Camerata Salzburg, and the Toronto Symphony Orchestra. She was invited by violinist Ruggiero Ricci to perform with him in his final concert in Washington DC. She performed as a soloist with the Verbier Festival Chamber Orchestra conducted by Maxim Vengerov at Toronto's Roy Thomson Hall, New York's Carnegie Hall, Amsterdam's Concertgebouw, Vienna's Musikverein, and London's Barbican Centre.

Seiler has recorded violin concertos and chamber repertoire for such labels as Virgin Classics, JVC Victor, Hyperion Records, and Capriccio.

== Recordings ==
- Boccherini: Sextets - Op. 23, Nos. 1, 3, 4, 6, with Silvia Walch, Diemut Poppen, Richard Lester, and Howard Penny. Capriccio (1992)
- Mendelssohn: Violin Concertos In E And D Minor, with the City of London Sinfonia. Black Box (2001)
- Beethoven, Mendelssohn, Haydn: Violin Concertos, with the City of London Sinfonia. Virgin Classics (2003)
