= Jonathan Carney =

American musician

Jonathan Carney is an American violinist and conductor. He is the concertmaster of the Baltimore Symphony Orchestra. The orchestra has announced his intention to retire at the end of its 2026-2027 season. Mr. Carney is the longest serving concertmaster in the history of the orchestra and in recognition of his outstanding service to the orchestra, he will be named the BSO’s first concertmaster laureate in its 109-year history in 2027.

== Career ==
Carney grew up in Tenafly, New Jersey and graduated from Tenafly High School. He studied at the Juilliard School with Christine Dethier and Ivan Galamian.

He moved to London on a Leverhulme Fellowship Award to study at the Royal College of Music with Trevor Williams.

In 1991 he became leader of the Royal Philharmonic Orchestra and appeared as soloist with them in the UK and beyond. In 1994 he was also appointed Concertmaster of the Bournemouth Symphony Orchestra, having been joint leader on its American tour; he recorded the Nielsen concerto with them in 1997 (on a Domenico Montagnana instrument). As a member of the Michael Nyman Band he played on the soundtrack of several Peter Greenaway films.

Carney is the concertmaster of the Baltimore Symphony Orchestra. The orchestra has announced his intention to retire at the end of its 2026-2027 season. In 2018, Katherine Needleman, principal oboist of the Baltimore Symphony, filed a harassment complaint against the orchestra with the U.S. Equal Employment Opportunity Commission (EEOC), accusing Carney of harassment and retaliation. The orchestra hired an independent investigator, and the investigation concluded there was no hostile work environment so Carney was not disciplined. Carney was later suspended after additional allegations of “inappropriate behavior” toward a musician with the Mid-Atlantic Symphony were reported.

Needleman closed out her EEOC complaint in 2023, saying it had been several years since she heard anything from the agency, and filed a Freedom of Information Act to obtain all the documentation from her filing. Carney remains with the orchestra.
