= Graham Ashton (trumpeter) =

Musician

Graham Ashton is a British-born naturalized American trumpeter and composer for brass. Ashton first formed his group, the Graham Ashton Brass Ensemble, in London in 1989, then reformed the ensemble with virtuoso brass players from New York City. In addition to his own compositions Ashton has sought new compositions for trumpet from other composers. He is Professor of Trumpet and Chair of Brass at Purchase College, State University of New York since 1999.

== Selected compositions ==
- "Birdsong"
- "Fantasia Upon a Ground after Purcell"
- "Fantasy on Catherine's Song"

== Discography ==
- The Graham Ashton Brass Ensemble plays the music of James Pugh and Daniel Schnyder Signum Records
- Scenes of Spirits, Signum Records
