= Hilary Summers =

Welsh lyric contralto

Hilary Summers is a Welsh lyric contralto. She was trained at Reading University, the Royal Academy of Music, and the National Opera Studio in London. She has performed on soundtracks such as The Lord of the Rings: The Two Towers, The Libertine, and The Hitchhiker's Guide to the Galaxy. She has created roles for composers Péter Eötvös and Elliott Carter, and is known to have a close working relationship with Michael Nyman. She created the leading role of the Art Banker in Nyman's opera Facing Goya. In 2000 she performed the role of Mars in the first modern revival of Giovanni Legrenzi's La divisione del mondo at the Schwetzingen Festival. Her discography includes, for Chandos, Handel's Partenope and Semele. She sang the Sorceress in Dido and Aeneas at the Opéra-Comique (2008, William Christie).
