= Beverley Davison =

British violin virtuoso

- Genres: Classical music
- Occupation: Musician
- Instrument: Violin
- Labels: Cameo Classics Records
- Website: www.classicalcabaret.com

Beverley Davison is a British violin virtuoso, currently fronting an act she founded called Classical Cabaret: Hot Strings (ensemble) or "Classical Cabaret Duo" (solo with piano).

== Biography ==
The daughter of conductor Arthur Davison, at the age of nine, she was selected for the Yehudi Menuhin School where she studied violin with Yehudi Menuhin himself. At 21, she was invited to guest-lead London Sinfonietta and Fires of London. She continued her studies at the Royal Academy and performed with the London Schools' Symphony Orchestra.

At the age of 21 she joined Sir Peter Maxwell Davies' Fires of London. Suffering from stage fright and eating disorders she stopped performing at the age of 25, and worked in various jobs including as a beauty therapist, a driving instructor, and in telesales. She returned to music when she took a teaching post at the Birmingham School of Music. She formed Hot Strings in 1990, after turning down an offer from Simon Rattle to be co-leader of the City of Birmingham Symphony Orchestra.

Davison collaborated with Rudolf Nureyev on a ballet based on Arnold Schoenberg's Pierrot Lunaire. On the Cameo Classics label, she has recorded Carl Nielsen's Violin concerto and Mozart's Violin Concerto in D Major. She has taught the violin at the University of Surrey in Guildford and has tutored at the summer orchestral course, ECSOC, In Guernsey, Channel Islands.

Davison has performed with Bolshoi Orchestra, Rambert Orchestra, Birmingham Royal Orchestra, English National Orchestra and Harlem Ballet Orchestras, the Michael Nyman Band and the Birmingham Contemporary Music Group.
