= Dave Lee (horn player) =

British horn player with extensive orchestral experience

- Genres: Classical
- Occupation: Musician
- Instrument: Horn
- Years active: 1996–present
- Labels: Quartz Music

David Lee (or Dave Lee) is currently solo horn with the Michael Nyman Band. He has held principal positions with the Royal Philharmonic Orchestra, London Philharmonic Orchestra and Royal Opera House Orchestra.

He has performed at the Wigmore Hall and the Purcell Room and has recorded widely, including film and television soundtracks such as Band of Brothers. He has released an album called Under the Influence.

Dave Lee has a prominent role in the memoir, I Found My Horn, by Jasper Rees.
