= Ann Morfee =

British musician

- Genres: Classical, Pop and Show music
- Occupation: Musician
- Instrument: Violin
- Years active: 1992-present

Ann Morfee, sometimes credited as "Anne Morphee", "Ann Morphy", or similar variants, is co-founder of Opus 20. She was a member of the Michael Nyman Band from 1992 to 2002.

== Life ==
She was educated at Chetham's School, Manchester, University of York and Guildhall School of Music and Drama.

She has worked with Richard Niles, Simon Hale, Audrey Riley, Cathy Giles, Colin Sheen, Graeme Perkins, Isobel Griffiths, John Wilson, Justin Pearson, London Metropolitan Orchestras Ltd, London Session Orchestra, London Telefilmonic Orchestra, Music Solutions Ltd, Roz Colls and Oasis.

She has performed in pit orchestras for the shows Chitty Chitty Bang Bang, Evita, Joseph, Love Never Dies, Dirty Rotten Scoundrels, Top Hat, Kinky Boots (musical), Shrek, Charlie and the Chocolate factory and The Producers.
