= Sarah Leonard (singer) =

English opera singer (1953–2024)

Sarah Leonard MBE
- Sarah Leonard, in c. 1992
- Born: 18 April 1953; Winchester, England
- Education: Guildhall School of Music and Drama
- Occupations: Classical soprano; Academic teacher
- Organizations: BBC Singers; Central School of Speech and Drama; Fitzwilliam College, Cambridge; University of Hull

Sarah Jane Leonard (10 April 1953 – 31 October 2024) was an English classical soprano, known for her performances of contemporary classical music by composers such as Helmut Lachenmann, Harrison Birtwistle, Pierre Boulez and Michael Nyman.

== Biography ==
The daughter of Kingsley Leonard and Marjorie ('Molly') Leonard (née Lait), Leonard was born in Winchester. She began violin studies aged 8 and piano studies at 9. Aged 11, she joined her father in the choir of St Cross Church, Winchester. She continued her music studies at the Guildhall School of Music and Drama, where her teachers included Benjamin Luxon and Noelle Barker.

Leonard subsequently was a member of the BBC Singers, the Endymion Ensemble, and London Sinfonietta Voices. Her experiences with the BBC Singers prepared her for her subsequent work with contemporary music. She made her debut at La Scala, Milan, in 1989 in the premiere of Dr Faustus by Giacomo Manzoni.

Leonard taught at the Central School of Speech and Drama and Fitzwilliam College, Cambridge. She was a member of the Association of Teachers of Singing, the British Voice Association and was Chairman of the Association of English Singers and Speakers. She sang the theme tune to Silent Witness, 'Silencium' by composer John Harle, and also sang on the 2014 album, The Tyburn Tree (Dark London), by John Harle and Marc Almond. Michael Nyman composed his work Memorial for Leonard.

Leonard also taught at the University of Hull. In January 2013, the University of Hull awarded Leonard an honorary Doctor of Music degree. In the 2024 Birthday Honours list, Leonard was appointed a Member of the Order of the British Empire for services to music.

Leonard was married twice. Her first marriage, in 1975, was to Michael Parkinson. The couple had a son, Edward, and a daughter, Helen. The marriage ended in divorce. Leonard's second marriage was to Peter Kelly, in 2011. Leonard died from a brain tumour on 31 October 2024, at the age of 71.
