= Gabrielle Lester =

British musician

- Also known as: Gaby Lester
- Genres: Classical; Soundtracks; Popular music
- Occupations: Musician; Orchestra leader
- Instrument: Violin
- Labels: Various

Gabrielle Lester (also known as Gaby Lester) is an English classical violinist and orchestra leader. She maintains an extensive discography of classical, popular and soundtrack recordings.

== Career ==
Gaby Lester was born in London, and is recognized for chamber music and as a leader of orchestras in the UK. Lester played principal second violin with the Scottish Chamber Orchestra and The Chamber Orchestra of Europe. She played principal second violin for five years with Sir Simon Rattle and the City of Birmingham Symphony Orchestra with whom she also played solo at the BBC Proms. Lester was the Associate Leader of the Royal Philharmonic Orchestra for five years. She led the Orchestra of the Age of Enlightenment in Das Rheingold at the Proms and has guest-led orchestras including the London Philharmonic Orchestra and the BBC Symphony Orchestra. Lester is a member of the Barbican Piano trio and coaches at the Royal College of Music. She has directed the Ambache Chamber Ensemble with whom she has recorded chamber music for Chandos Records and has recorded albums with the Michael Nyman Band. She plays regularly at the International Musicians Seminar at Prussia Cove. Her violin is a Francesco Ruggieri dating from 1670.

== Discography ==
A partial listing of Lester's recordings includes:

- La Sept, Suite 1989
- Pete Townshend Live: Sadler's Wells 2000
- The Draughtsman's Contract 2005
- To Love Again 2005
- Doctor Who – Original Television Soundtrack 2006
- Overloaded – The Singles Collection 2006
- Dark Passion Play 2007
- Doctor Who – Original Television Soundtrack 2007
- Music From The Motion Picture – The Assassination of Jesse James by the Coward Robert Ford 2007
- 8 Lust Songs: I Sonetti Lussuriosi 2008
- Torchwood (Original Television Soundtrack) 2008
- La Pasión 2009
