= John Harle =

English musician (born 1956)

John Harle OBE FRSA
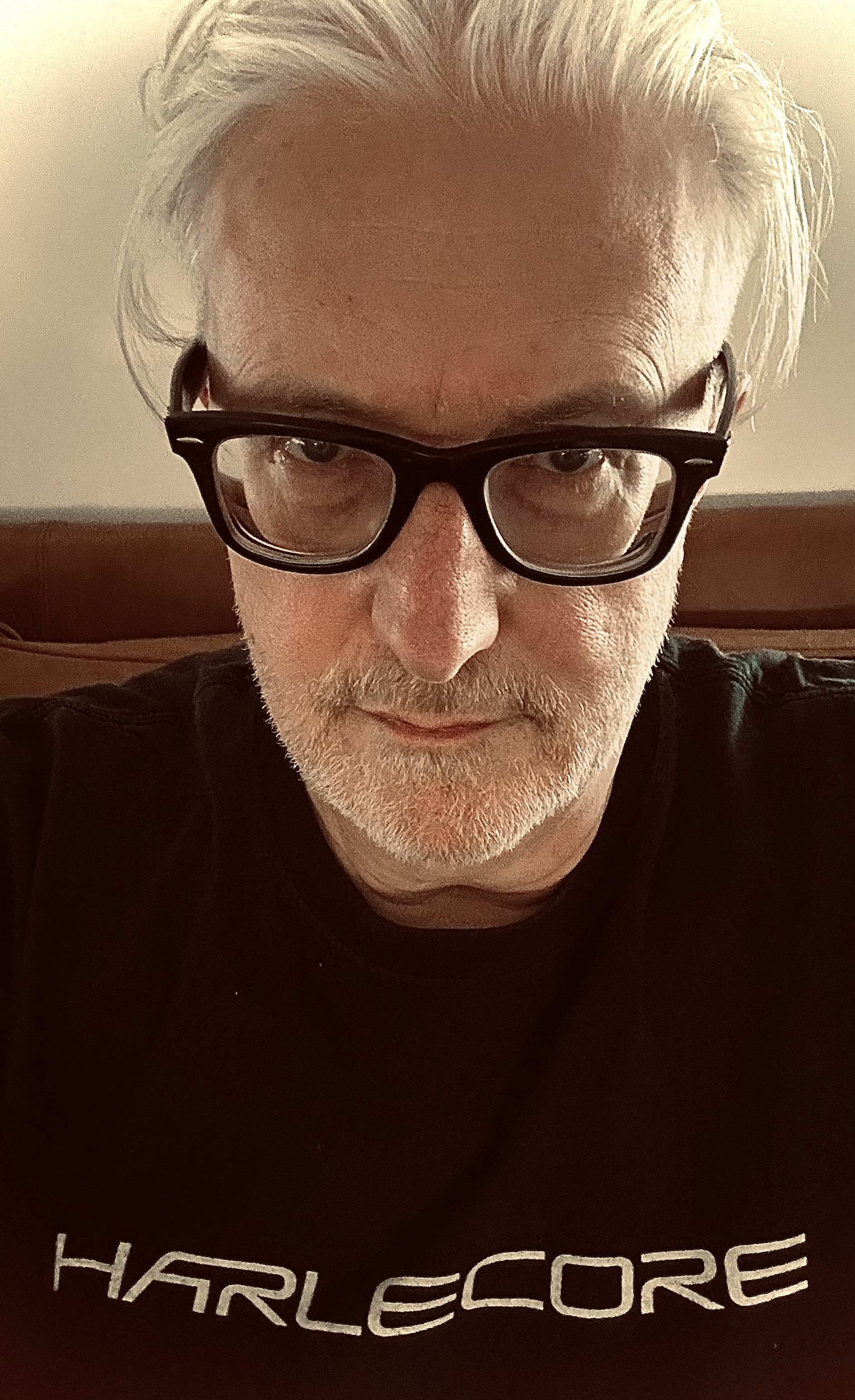
- John Harle in 2025

Background information
- Born: 20 September 1956 (age 70)
- Origin: Newcastle upon Tyne, England
- Genres: Progressive, Pop, Soundtrack, Hybrid, Classical
- Occupations: Composer and Musician
- Instrument: Saxophone
- Years active: 1973–present
- Labels: Universal, EMI Classics, Decca, Argo, Unicorn-Kanchana, Hannibal, Sospiro
- Website: www.johnharle.com

John Crofton Harle OBE FRSA FGS FCL (born 20 September 1956) is an English saxophonist, composer, record producer, conductor and educator. He is an Ivor Novello Award winner, has been the recipient of two Royal Television Society awards and has contributed directly and indirectly to a number of charting songs and albums.

Harle served as artistic advisor to Sir Paul McCartney for six years, and has also collaborated with Elvis Costello, Marc Almond, Herbie Hancock, Michael Nyman, Sir Harrison Birtwistle, Sir Richard Rodney Bennett, Stanley Myers and Elmer Bernstein. In May 1998, he was the castaway on BBC Radio 4's long- running Desert Island Discs programme. In October 2020, Harle released The John Harle Collection - a 20 Album retrospective of his career as composer and saxophonist. All proceeds from the collection were donated to the Help Musicians Coronavirus Appeal.

He is currently Director of The Guildhall Bauhaus and Professor of Music & Interdisciplinary Practice at The Guildhall School of Music and Drama, London. He was awarded the OBE in the King’s New Year Honours List in 2025 for services to music, and is an FRSA (Fellow of the Royal Society of Arts.)

== Biography ==
=== Early years ===
Harle was born in Newcastle upon Tyne in 1956, and from 1974 to 1977 was solo clarinettist in the band of the Coldstream Guards under the direction of Lt Col Trevor le Mere Sharpe OBE and Lt Col Richard Ridings OBE. At the Royal Military School of Music at Kneller Hall, he won the Cousins Memorial Medal for the best Army Instrumentalist in 1975.

He was awarded a Foundation Scholarship to enter the Royal College of Music in London to study the saxophone in 1977. He won the Dannreuter Concerto Competition in 1978, and in 1979 he was the first student in the history of the Royal College to graduate with a mark of 100%. Postgraduate studies were as a French Government Music Scholar in Paris with Daniel Deffayet, during which he won the 1984 AMCOM Award of The American Concert Artists Guild in New York.

Between 1978 and 1983 and he was a member of the National Theatre Music Department under the direction of Sir Harrison Birtwistle and Dominic Muldowney, performing in many productions as actor-musician including The Orestia (Sir Peter Hall/Harrison Birtwistle/Tony Harrison.) In 1989 he won the John Dankworth/Cleo Laine All-Music Musician of the Year at the Wavendon Music Awards. He was lead saxophonist with the band of composer Michael Nyman from 1979 to 2000, and Principal Saxophone of The London Sinfonietta from 1986 to 1995.

=== Performing Career: Saxophonist ===
Harle was the premier saxophone soloist in concert music from 1984 to the early 2000’s. Widely experienced, his work also included collaborations with major jazz artists such as Herbie Hancock, John Dankworth and Andy Sheppard.

As a solo performer he has worked in concert and in the recording studio with conductors such as Leonard Bernstein, Michael Tilson-Thomas, Riccardo Chailly, Sir Neville Marriner, Elmer Bernstein and Sir Andrew Davis, and has given performances throughout the UK, Europe, The US, Australasia and Japan.

Over 25 concerti have been written for him by composers including Mark Anthony Turnage, John Tavener, Michael Nyman, Gavin Bryars, Sally Beamish and Sir Harrison Birtwistle.

He has recorded over 50 albums. He premiered Birtwistle’s controversial saxophone concerto Panic at the Last Night of the Proms in 1995 and subsequent performances at the Proms have included his own concerto, The Little Death Machine, with The Orchestra of St John’s in 2002.

He was the lead saxophone in The Michael Nyman Band for 15 years, with Nyman describing his sound as "hard-edged romanticism". A BBC2 music-documentary was made about Harle, One Man and his Sax, produced and directed by Tony Stavacre.

Harle has written a reference book, The Saxophone: The Art and Science of Playing and Performing, published by Faber Music in 2017.

=== Composer ===
Harle has written around 50 concert works, including two operas (Angel Magick, for the BBC Proms in 1997, and The Ballad of Jamie Allan, for the Sage, Gateshead in 2004.) In 2014 he composed the progressive rock drama The Tyburn Tree with singer Marc Almond OBE. He performed his own saxophone concerto (The Little Death Machine) at the BBC Proms in 2002. His orchestral work Arcadia was produced as a full-scale Ballet by Birmingham Royal Ballet in 2017, and his oratorio Earthlight was performed by Vasily Petrenko and the Royal Liverpool Philharmonic Orchestra in 2009.

A jingle he wrote for Nissan in 1993 became a charting pop single that reached No 1 in the UK Dance Charts. His album Terror and Magnificence (1996) featured Elvis Costello, Sarah Leonard and Andy Sheppard. He also contributed to the charting album Standing Stone (1997) by Paul McCartney.

He has composed several works for the saxophonist Jess Gillam MBE, including two concertos (Briggflatts, and The Keys of Canterbury), both in 2019.

=== Film and Television Composer ===
From 1980, Harle worked as orchestrator and producer for film composer Stanley Myers, expanding from that into scoring for film and television. In the 1990s, he began a career as composer and saxophonist both artistically and commercially. In 1997, Harle composed the theme tune for the BBC TV series Silent Witness, and the theme has continued to run through a further 26 series, and in 2000 he composed the epic score for Simon Schama’s A History of Britain for the BBC. Harle’s prolific output as soundtrack composer amounts to over 100 film and television productions.

=== Producer ===
Harle is an accomplished producer in various genres, and has worked with EMI Classics, EMI Classics (Tokyo.) Decca Classics, Decca Argo, BMG Records, Hannibal Records, Sospiro Records. Artists include Paul McCartney, Elvis Costello, Marc Almond, Stanley Myers. Moondog, Michael Nyman, Lesley Garrett, Sir Willard White, Jess Gillam MBE, BBC Singers, BBC Symphony Orchestra and the BBC Concert Orchestra.

=== Conductor ===
Harle is a conductor across many musical genres. Examples include: London Symphony Orchestra (Berlin Nights 1998, Film Music conductor 2025) London Philharmonic Orchestra and Herbie Hancock, Royal Northern Sinfonia (Jamie Allen Opera 2005, Percy Grainger BBC Prom 2011) Bauhaus Band and singers (Angel Magick BBC Proms 1998) BBC Philharmonic Orchestra (Global Echoes, BBC Prom 2000, Gormenghast, 2000) BBC Concert Orchestra (A History of Britain 2000, Silent Witness 2021) Royal Liverpool Philharmonic Orchestra (Standing Stone, McCartney 1997, Polar, Song of the Arctic 2010) and BBC Singers (A History of Britain 2000, Silent Witness 1996).

=== Educator ===
Harle has been an educator, serving at the Guildhall School of Music and Drama in London where he started the saxophone faculty in 1984 with the support of trumpeter Philip Jones CBE and established it to be the most successful single instrument faculty in Guildhall with the highest proportion of 1st class honours degrees awarded. The GSMD’s own saxophone ensemble became a semi-professional body, forming into the London Saxophonic, working with Moondog, and Elvis Costello at his Meltdown Festival at the Southbank Centre in 1995. Students included Rob Buckland (Professor at RNCM), Christian Forshaw (Professor at Guildhall School), Gerard McChrystal (Professor at Trinity Laban), Simon Haram (Professor at RAM), Tim Garland (solo jazz artist and composer), and Will Gregory (composer and core member of Goldfrapp).

He was International Chair of Saxophone at The Royal Northern College of Music from 2006-2007.

He was a Senior Lecturer in Music and Performance at Canterbury Christ Church University from 2014 to 2016.

Returning to The Guildhall School in 2017, he was appointed Director of the Guildhall Bauhaus, Director of The Leadership Academy, Professor of Music and Interdisciplinary Practice, Professor of Electronic and Produced Music and Professor of Saxophone. He was awarded the Fellowship of the Guildhall School of Music and Drama in 1990, and in 2016 was conferred the title of Professor. In 2022 he was appointed a Visiting Fellow of Torch (The Oxford Research Centre for the Humanities) at The University of Oxford.

He has been mentor to both Jess Gillam MBE and Yolanda Brown OBE DL.

=== Awards and Media Appearances ===
In 2012, the Royal Television Society awarded Harle its "Music: Original Score" award for his composition for BBC 2's programme Lucian Freud: Painted Life, describing it as "An excellent, challenging and original score that perfectly complements Freud's powerful imagery". It also won the 2013 British Academy of Songwriters, Composers and Authors (BASCA) Ivor Novello Award for "Best Television Soundtrack".

In October 2013, on BBC Radio 3's In Tune programme, Harle talked about his recently released album Art Music, the composition of which was inspired by his favourite paintings.

Harle appeared with Marc Almond on BBC Radio 4's Front Row in February 2014 to discuss their collaborative work about Gothic London, The Tyburn Tree (Dark London). Harle was a guest on the same programme in November of that year, to mark the bicentenary of the birth of Adolphe Sax by assessing the contribution of Sax's invention, the saxophone.

== Awards ==
Ivor Novello Awards

Winner for Best Soundtrack 2013 - for 'Lucian Freud - Painted Life' (Blakeway Productions for BBC2).

=== The Royal Television Society ===
Winner for 'best original music for television' 2012 - for 'Lucian Freud - Painted Life' (Blakeway Productions for BBC2).

Winner for best original title music for television 1998 - Silent Witness (BBC1)

Nomination for best music for television 2009 - The Commander (LaPlante/ITV1)

Nomination for best music for television 2000 - Summer in the Suburbs (BBC2)

Nomination for best original title for television 2002 - Defence of the Realm (BBC1)

Grammy

Nomination 1999 - Terror and Magnificence

Billboard USA

Reached No.1 position on Crossover Album charts, 1999 - Terror and Magnificence

Mercury Music Awards

Nomination - 1999 - Terror and Magnificence

Cannes Film Festival

Best Artistic Achievement in a Feature Film - 1988 - Prick Up Your Ears - with Stanley Myers

== Personal life ==
John Harle has two sons: writer Matthew Harle, currently Curator of Artistic Programmes at the Warburg Institute, University of London, and composer/producer Danny L Harle (Caroline Polacheck, Dua Lipa, Chic, Carly Rae Jepsen, Harlecore, PC Music)
