= Nigel Barr =

British musician

- Origin: High Wycombe, England
- Genres: Classical music
- Occupation: Musician
- Instrument(s): Bass trombone, euphonium, tuba
- Years active: 1988-present
- Website: http://www.barrlines.co.uk/

Nigel Barr grew up as a member of the High Wycombe Salvation Army band. In 1980 he went to the Guildhall School of Music and studied trombone with Peter Gane and Denis Wick during that time he was also a member of International Staff Band (1980–82) playing bass trombone.

Since then Barr has had a varied freelance career and several business ventures, including setting up in 1982 which manufactured and distributed leather gig bags. Initially the gig bags were manufactured in Telford and later Hay-on-Wye but due to retirement of the key craftsman there has been a break in manufacture. Today the gig bags are manufactured in Grantham, Lincolnshire. In the early nineties he became a shareholder of Sterling Brass Instruments which are still manufactured today.

He has been a member of the Michael Nyman Band since 1988 and undertaken many tours with the ensemble all over the world, including Hong Kong, Japan, Korea, Taiwan, New Zealand, Australia, Spain, Europe, US, Mexico, Russia and Slovenia.

In 1992 Michael Nyman asked Barr to become his manager he became involved with the business of music publishing, film scores and recording contracts. This has led to further consultancy roles with many composers and film companies in the UK and US.

Nigel has been on the Global Mediation Panel as an accredited mediator since 2013 and from 2022 he has been an In-house mediator. Nigel is recognised as an accredited SEND Mediator and is also an ADR Group Accredited Civil and Commercial Mediator (2013) with dual qualification giving him accreditation of The International Academy of Dispute Resolution and the Civil Mediation Council.

Nigel has completed over 500 mediations.

== Selected filmography ==
- Prospero's Books (1991)
- The Michael Nyman Songbook (1992) (on-screen appearance)
- À la folie (1994)
- The Ogre (1996)
- Wonderland (1999)
- Dead Babies (2000) (music supervisor)
- The Claim (2000)
