= David Roach (saxophonist) =

British saxophonist (born 1955)

- Born: 1955
- Genres: Classical music
- Occupation: Musician
- Instrument: Saxophone
- Years active: 1985–2025

David Roach (born 1955 in Darlington, Co. Durham, England) was a British saxophonist who released a solo single, "Emotional Jungle" in 1984. His album I Love Sax reached No. 73 in the UK Albums Chart in April that year. As a Coda-Landscape recording artist in the 1980s, Roach made two albums Running with the River and The Talking City.

He has played soprano and alto saxophone for the Michael Nyman Band since 1985, making his debut on The Kiss and Other Movements and appearing on nearly every album since. Prior to that, he was musical director for Billy Ocean and a founding member of the Myrha Saxophone Quartet. Roach played oboe and saxophone for Frank Sinatra in his European tours of the early 1990s.

He was a member of the Apollo Saxophone Quartet and producer of the London Saxophonic. He also co-produced Nyman's albums After Extra Time (1996), The Suit and the Photograph and Sangam.

Roach's soprano and alto saxophone playing has featured in many film and television scores. He has played with most of the major London orchestras, including 25 years for the Philharmonia Orchestra, and he has been a visiting professor of chamber music at the Guildhall School of Music and Drama in London and the Royal Northern College of Music in Manchester.
