= Andrew Findon =

English musician

- Origin: London, England
- Genres: Classical, folk, pop, dance, big band, musicals,
- Occupations: Flautist, saxophonist, clarinettist
- Years active: 1974–present
- Labels: Nimbus Alliance, Quartz, MadeUpMusic, Inspired Music, KPM
- Website: www.andyfindon.com

Andrew (Andy) Findon is an English woodwind player, educated at Harrow County School and The Royal College of Music. Since 1980, he has been a baritone saxophone and flute player in the Michael Nyman Band and is also a member of Home Service and Acoustic Earth.

In addition to his ensemble work, Findon has been a session player, contributing to albums across various genres. He has composed and recorded for music libraries such as EMI's KPM, Made Up Music, and has been featured on solo panpipe CDs for labels including Virgin Records, Crimson, and EMI.

Findon's solo albums include Tracked, released on the Quartz label in 2005, and When The Boat Comes In in 2007. In 2008, he transcribed and recorded Michael Nyman's "Yamamoto Perpetuo" for solo flute, an eleven-movement, 37 minute piece. His CD Density 21.5, featuring unaccompanied flute music, was released by Nimbus Alliance in August 2011. In May 2013, Nimbus released The Dancing Flute, a collection of compositions for flutes and piano by pianist and composer Geoff Eales.

He played the penny whistle in the soundtrack for How to Train Your Dragon films.
