= A Life in Suitcases (album) =

2005 soundtrack album by Borut Kržišnik

Studio album by Borut Kržišnik
- Released: 2005, rerelease: September 2012
- Recorded: 2005
- Studio: P. N. studios, Ljubljana
- Genre: contemporary; avant-garde; eclecticism
- Length: 68:16
- Label: Claudio Records; First Name Soundtracks
- Producer: Borut Kržišnik

Borut Kržišnik chronology
Stories from Magatrea (1997)	A Life in Suitcases (2005)	Sacre du Temps (2007)

A Life in Suitcases is the fourth album by Slovenian composer Borut Kržišnik. It was originally released by First Name Soundtracks in 2005, and rereleased by Claudio Records (division Claudio Contemporary), in 2013. The album contains music composed for three feature films: The Moab Stories, Vaux to the Sea, and A Life in Suitcases, which are parts of The Tulse Luper Suitcases series. The films were written and directed by British filmmaker Peter Greenaway.

== Context ==
The films of The Tulse Luper Suitcases series, including the film A Life in Suitcases, narrate the life of Tulse Luper, a fictional writer, adventurer, and Greenaway's alter ego, whose story intertwines with key events of the turbulent twentieth century. Luper's life is defined by repeated imprisonment across multiple continents and decades, beginning at age ten in 1920s South Wales when locked in a coalhouse by his father. In 1938, his arrest in 1938 Moab, Utah, due to associations with a family exploiting the impending World War II, triggers a decade-long imprisonment across Europe under jailers fascinated by him and connected to uranium interests. During the Cold War, he is held in prisons in Moscow, Siberia, Hong Kong, and Kyoto with reported sightings in 1980s Beijing and Shanghai before apparently disappearing in a Manchurian desert. Luper spent his time in 16 different prisons creating art—including projects spanning literature, theatre, film, and painting, often writing directly on cell walls—and engaging with his jailers in all manner of plots, schemes and adventures. A central theme is the complex, often symbiotic relationship between jailer and prisoner, where both become captives of their roles, driving much of the narrative's drama.

== Recording ==
In an interview with The Guardian, Greenaway described his approach to film music: encouraging creative autonomy and avoiding illustrative music-making. He recalled telling the composer: "Go away and write the music you want," explaining that he felt confident, knowing the artist's work, to be able "to arrange, in editing, which bit went where." He required composers to work without visual references (such as rough cuts of the film) or scripts, preventing prescriptive instructions that might lead to literal illustration. "I’ve always refused to allow composers to read scripts" he said, "– I don’t want them to try to illustrate it." Kržišnik later affirmed this approach in his 2002 Dnevnik interview, recalling Greenaway telling him: "You don't need to adhere to anything, not even the script."

In a Delo interview, Kržišnik detailed Peter Greenaway's distinctive approach to film scoring, specifically his practice of editing film to pre-composed music rather than scoring to edited footage. Greenaway typically required composers to submit completed scores before filming commenced—reversing the standard post-production workflow where composers base their work on final (or near-final) cuts. This method allowed Greenaway to analyze the score's structure during pre-production, using it to plan the script, camera movements, action timings, and synchronize filming with the music's rhythm and development.

The approach stemmed from Greenaway's belief in music's structural integrity. He argued that unlike visuals or text, music develops, changes, and escalates as a complex whole and resists arbitrary editing. The image can be easily cut, but music imposes its own "tyrannical" temporality – it demands obedience to its internal clock.

By having composers work without visual references, Greenaway prevented illustrative scoring and encouraged creative autonomy. He avoided prescriptive instructions, advising Kržišnik: "You don’t need to adhere to anything, not even the script."

== Critical reception ==
Steven A. Kennedy from Film Score Monthly wrote, "The music shifts between clearly tonal moments and more astringent atonal passages. It’s almost as if the two styles must battle things out in a kind of musical war." "Surreal" and "avant-garde" is how John Bender characterized the music, calling it, "a portrait of chaos and hellishness — a Bosch landscape."

"Within the film’s radical concept, the "extremely eclectic, multilayered" nature of the music was very welcome", Dušan Jesih of RTV SLO argued.

In a featured critique essay for Delo, Mitja Reichenberg contextualized Borut Kržišnik's use of a virtual orchestra within historical avant-garde and electronic music traditions while questioning the autonomy of concert-stage performance. Reichenberg argued that the duality between real and virtual elements in Kržišnik's work is not a flaw but a platform for projecting ideas into reality, noting the composer is "fully aware of that." He observed that while Kržišnik does not entirely lose contact with real instruments, tonality, and real-world contextualization, he keeps breaking free from them into virtual abstractions —a continual negotiation defining his method. Reichenberg positioned the album as a manifesto for music's evolution into "virtual events," or "journeys without suitcases" as he put it—artificial yet historically resonant simulations liberating composition from physical stages.

Reichenberg highlighted Kržišnik's distinctive sound as a fundamental characteristic of his artistry. Citing John Cage—who recognized electronic music as sound "no longer bound to tradition but reflecting its time," thereby anticipating "the search for new sonic realities"—Reichenberg contended Kržišnik "does precisely that." He further contemplated how all soundscapes—whether from domestic spaces, industrial machinery, digital realms, or musical expression—resonate with the Zeitgeist, concluding: "Kržišnik’s music is part of today’s virtual world."

In a review for Mladina, Ičo Vidmar praised Borut Kržišnik's score as "singing, playful, and deliriously drunken counterpoint" that functions effectively both within A Life in Suitcases and as standalone music. He highlighted Kržišnik's intriguing handling of the virtual orchestra, noting his unique position as a composer who "becomes his own orchestra" through technology. This approach allows Kržišnik to realize his orchestral vision precisely—free from physical or financial-production constraints—while introducing his unorthodoxies. Vidmar identified subversive energy and technical mastery in the album and called it "the devil's own band".

Miha Zadnikar of Ekran highlighted Borut Kržišnik's use of a virtual orchestra, describing the score as "astonishingly layered" and "colorful". He noted its capacity to achieve dense, "sculpted masses" of sound impossible for live orchestras to sustain, and emphasized its effectiveness both within the film and as standalone music. He contextualized Kržišnik's computer-based composition method within debates about technology's legitimacy in music—observing past controversy in Slovenia, particularly among conservative classical circles. Zadnikar concluded that Kržišnik functioned as Greenaway's "musical counterpart" for this project, moving beyond minimalism to "dissect the soul" of the film.

== Track listing ==
No.	Title	Length
1.	"Trembling Web"	9:56
2.	"Love Song No.1"	5:05
3.	"Passion Festivo"	5:39
4.	"Sudden Spell"	3:52
5.	"March to Eternity"	10:16
6.	"Creeping"	3:41
7.	"Festa"	6:38
8.	"War Machine"	1:24
9.	"Funeral March"	6:05
10.	"Miracle on Magatrea"	11:15
11.	"Slaves"	4:27

== Personnel ==
Musicians:

- Borut Kržišnik – virtual orkestra
- Vuk Kraković - violin (#2 and #10)
- Mario Marolt - clarinet (#2)

Production:

- Composed and produced: Borut Kržišnik
- Artistic adviser: Aleksandra Rekar
- Recording engineer: Bac Kajuh
- Recording engineer assistant: Turob Tušek
- Recorded and mixed at P.N. Studios, Ljubljana, Slovenia, 2003–2004
- Mastering: Simon Heyworth at Super Audio Mastering
- Artwork: TBT design
- Stills from the film A Life in Suitcases, The Moab Story and The Vaux to the Sea courtesy of Kasander Films

Label:

- Claudio Records (div. Claudio Contemporary)

Publisher:

- Mute Song Ltd

== Reviews ==
- Kennedy, Steven (September 2006). "A Life in Suitcases". Film Score Monthly. Los Angeles: Film Score Monthly.
- Bender, John (September 2006). "A Life in Suitcases". Film Score Monthly. Los Angeles: Film Score Monthly.
- Russell, Mark; Sandall, Robert (3 March 2006). "Mixing It". Mixing It. Event occurs at 22:15-23:30. BBC, Radio 3.
- Southall, James (28 December 2006). "A Life in Suitcases". www.movie-wave.net. Movie Wave.
- McLennan, Michael (December 2006). "A Life in Suitcases". www.musicweb-international.com. Musicweb.
- Reichenberg, Mitja (17 December 2005). "Glasbeno potovanje brez kovčkov" [A Musical Journey without Suitcases]. Delo (in Slovenian). Ljubljana. Archived from the original on 9 May 2025.
- Zadnikar, Miha (August–September 2006). "Virtualni orkester za razbiranje duše" [A virtual Orchestra for Discerning the Soul]. Ekran (in Slovenian). No. 5. Ljubljana. p. 59.
- Smasek, Uroš (8 March 2006). "Borut Kržišnik: Življenje v kovčkih" [Borut Kržišnik: A Life in Suitcases] (PDF). Večer (in Slovenian). Maribor.
- Vidmar, Ičo (11 January 2006). "Borut Kržišnik: A Life in Suitcases". Mladina (in Slovenian). Ljubljana.
- Bauman, Gregor (11 January 2006). "Kovček življenja" [Suitcase of Life]. Finance (in Slovenian). Ljubljana.
- Jesih, Dušan (5 February 2006). "Borut Kržišnik: A Life in Suitcases" [Borut Kržišnik: A Life in Suitcases]. www.rtvslo.si (in Slovenian). MMC RTV SLO. Event occurs at 15:22.
- Kus, Peter (22 January 2006). "Idealna godba: Borut Kržišnik" [Ideal Music: Borut Kržišnik]. Radio Študent. Ideal Music (in Slovenian). Event occurs at 21:30 - 24:00.
- Batelič, Mario (12 February 2006). "Borut Kržišnik: A Life in Suitcases". Radio Študent. Tolpa bumov (in Slovenian). Event occurs at 19:00 – 20:00.

== Interviews ==
- "The Best Music in Film". Sight & Sound. London: British Film Institute. Archived from the original on 5 September 2006.
- Kus, Peter (August 2003). "Digitalne partiture virtualnih simfoničnih orkestrov" [Digital Scores of Virtual simphonic orchestras]. Muska (in Slovenian). Ljubljana: Društvo za raziskovanje popularne glasbe.
- Milek, Vesna (14 June 2003). "Zame je narava tudi kandelaber čez cesto" [Streetlight across the Street Is Also Part of Nature]. Delo (Sobotna priloga ed.). Ljubljana: Delo. Archived from the original on 28 April 2025.
- Bašin, Igor (3 January 2006). "Skladatelj med virtualnim in realnim" [Composer Between the Virtual and the Real]. Dnevnik (in Slovenian). Ljubljana: Dnevnik Mediji. Archived from the original on 28 February 2025.
- Butala, Gregor (25 March 2002). "Glasba kot podlaga za film" [Music as a basis for a film]. Dnevnik (in Slovenian). Ljubljana: Dnevnik Mediji. Archived from the original on 4 March 2025.
- Koprivica, Jelena (March 2006). "Muzika bez pritisaka" [Music without Limitations]. Politika (in Serbian). Belgrade.
