= Borut Kržišnik =

Slovenian composer (born 1961)

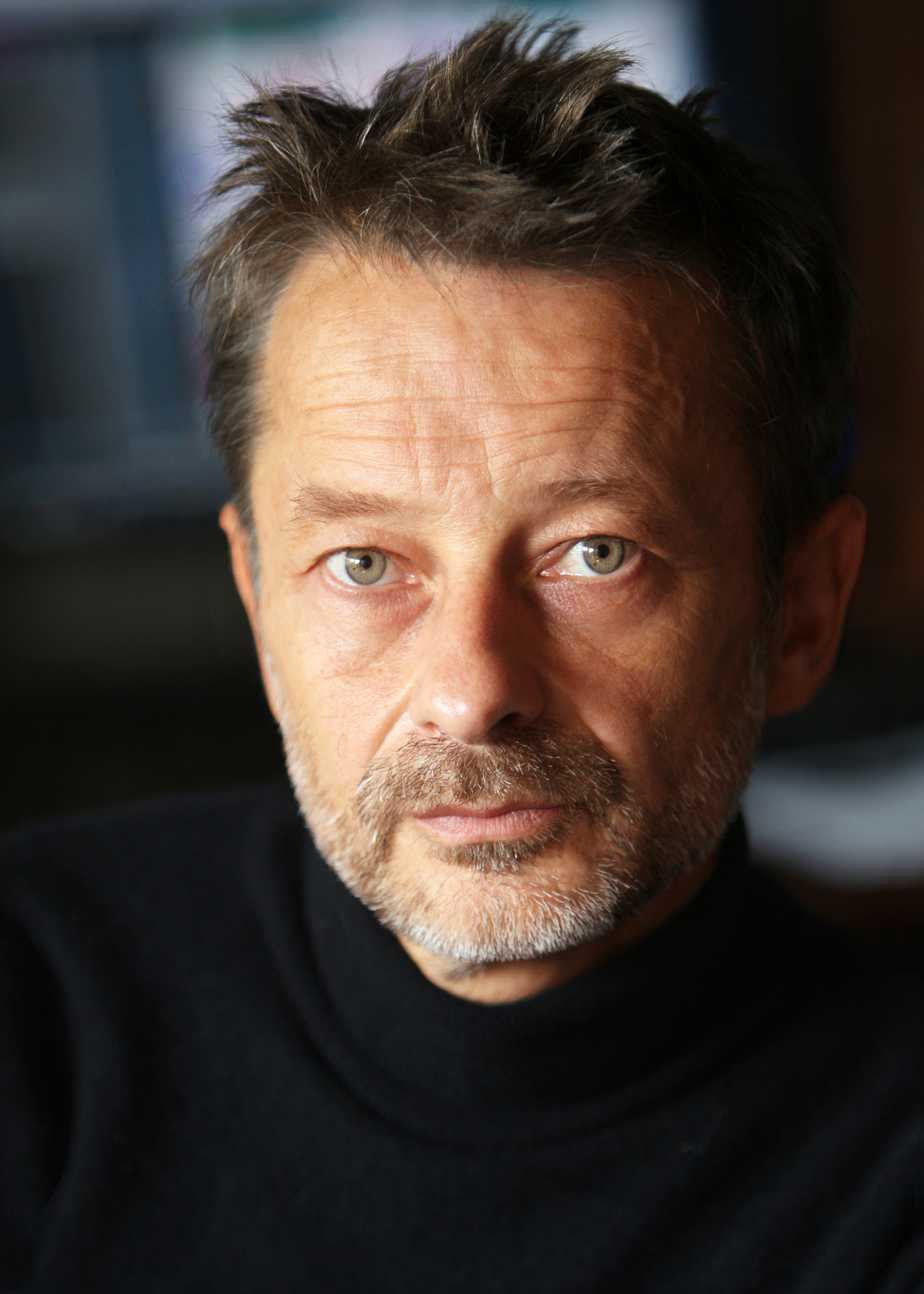

Background information
- Born: October 7, 1961 (age 64); Zagreb, Croatia, Yugoslavia
- Origin: Ljubljana, Slovenia
- Genres: avant-garde; contemporary; eclecticism
- Years active: 1980–present
- Labels: Claudio Records; Recommended Records; Falcata-Galia Recordings; Tone Casualties
- Website: borutkrzisnik.si

Borut Kržišnik (born 7 October 1961) is a Slovenian composer of contemporary music, based in Ljubljana. He is best known for his "polyglot musical style", and his concept of integration of live acoustic music with digital environment and technology.

According to the editorial board of the Music Biennale Zagreb 2014, Kržišnik is considered one of "the most notable representative of the historical avant-garde." The board highlighted his methodology, particularly his use of sampling, which enables the emulation of a virtual symphony orchestra as well as entirely synthetic sounds. They identified the dynamic between digital and classical techniques as fundamental to his music, noting that "among the most important elements of his musical language is the synthesis of technologically advanced (digital) composer interventions and classical ones." They framed his work as a "polyglot musical invention" that freely draws on a wide range of techniques and styles, from popular and cacophonic to atonal, tonal, minimalistic, and neoclassical.

The methodology and musical content in Kržišnik's work are closely related. Kržišnik's creative practice unfolds in two distinct, intertwining stages: an initial phase of spontaneous composition followed by one of conceptual structuring. He begins with free improvisation and impromptu recording, without written notation or preconceived plans. This raw, unrestrained material gradually gives way to a second, structural phase in which he introduces fixed musical lines, shapes the work's structure and defines its contextualization. This planned phase does not reject the initial free impulse but builds upon it, creating a counterpoint between the spontaneity of live music and the mechanical logic of digital technology. Through this approach, Kržišnik stages a musical dialogue—or even a duel—between man and machine, interrogating the human condition in the material world.

He has released nine albums and composed music for numerous dance, film and theater productions. His most notable collaborations include Peter Greenaway, Gerald Thomas, Edward Clug, Janez Janša (then Emil Hrvatin), and Julie Anne Robinson, among others.

== Biography ==
=== Early years ===
Borut Kržišnik (1961) was born in Zagreb, Croatia, into a diplomatic family. Due to the nature of his father's profession, his family often changed its place of residence, and he therefore lived for various periods of time in Croatia, Serbia, Slovenia (all of which were part of the Yugoslavia at the time), and Romania. When he was two years old his family moved to Romania, where his father was appointed to the post of diplomatic attaché in Bucharest. When he turned 6, they moved to Belgrade, where he spent his early childhood. In 1973, they finally settled in Ljubljana, which became his permanent residence.

Living in various environments and experiencing many mentalities has greatly influenced his understanding of society, its diversity and ultimately his approach to music. His initial musical education focused on piano while attending a music school during his stay in Belgrade. After moving to Ljubljana, he quit music school and started teaching himself guitar. Simultaneously with his progress as an instrumentalist, he became interested in composition and began building his unique musical language, which he continued throughout the 1980s. He graduated from the Faculty of Arts in Ljubljana with a degree in psychology (1987), but never engaged with the subject professionally.

=== Career ===
Kržišnik's musical career started, as he himself said, at the moment he realized that he didn't want to play piano how it was taught at music school – with rigorous discipline and strict instructions on how the piece should be performed. "At least, it is how I perceived it at the time. That's why I decided at one point to take matters into my own hands and approach the music in my own way."

In the mid-1980s, in his formative years as a composer, he embraced the spontaneous composition method using his portable multitrack recorder. This enabled him to compose in more direct way, recording on the spot, without prior preparation, specific intentions, and sometimes – when recording machine was secretly turned on at some point – even without the knowledge of some of the participants that the session was being recorded. It also enables him to overdub multiple tracks and to make recordings more conveniently, at various places and at any time. As he explained in his interview for Delo, he appreciates "original impulses" when composing and "also takes into account the mistakes that arise in the process." The multitrack recorder remained his favourite tool through the mid-1990s.

In May 1990, Kržišnik started a collaboration with an ensemble of six musicians and spent three months carrying out research and making recordings with each of them individually. He built his music on their specific characters and contrasts. They used a variety of instruments, including popular, classical, and electronic, which move about freely within the structure of the compositions. They also brought into play concrète sounds, tape music, and circuit bending, techniques more used in electroacoustic music. It took them three months of editing and additional work before the final mix was achieved in the autumn of 1990. In September 1991, the album was released under the title Currents of Time.

In 1993, Kržišnik founded the five-member group Data Direct, bringing together Slovenian, Italian, and Serbian musicians from various musical backgrounds. Following the trajectory of Kržišnik's previous album, this band continued to work within the concept of eclecticism and built their compositions based on synthesis between predetermined and improvised music. However, they developed this concept further – by pursuing the perspective of the live performing group and, as a result, live performance became the dominant layer in its music. The group performed at festivals (Druga godba, 1993; Synthesis – Music of the 21st Century festival, Skopje; 1994, Vorax, Vicenza, 1994, etc.). In 1995, the album La Dolce Vita was released. Soon after the release of the album, the group quit working.

After the group ceased activities, Kržišnik turned his focus to his home studio and software technology. He started to work with a virtual orchestra, but kept having recording sessions with live musicians, although not as frequently as before. His home studio became the place where most of his work was done. It was there in 1996 and the first half of 1997 that he composed and recorded his new work, Stories from Magatrea. The self-titled album was released in November 1997.

Stories from Magatrea is considered a landmark album, as it laid the foundations of the methodology upon which his subsequent works would be built. Kržišnik described his way of composing as research, using live musicians on the one hand, and computer instruments on the other, and setting them to active confrontation. In this way, by making spontaneity of live performer fight mechanical principals of inanimate, digital machine, he rethinks the fundamentals of the human condition within the material world.

In 2009, after 12 years of intense collaborations in dance, film, and theater, Kržišnik composed and produced his sixth album, Valse Brutal. The album problematizes human violence and wars, their absurdity, and the mechanisms that enable them.

In his article "Brutal Waltz", Jure Potokar from Polet observed that the virtual orchestra is a powerful tool and has potential that exceeds the real sonic environment, but it takes a lot of editing and patience to achieve results, as opposed to the relatively fast intuitive process of playing a real instrument. Potokar also pointed out that its automatized functions, together with its high "democratization", as he put it, contribute to shifting the criteria of originality.

After two years of work, the album Lightning (2013) was released. In his 2013 review for Polet, Potokar noted its stark dynamic contrasts and an expansive range of articulations, from ethereal to tempestuous. He also highlighted its distinctive sonic properties, crediting Kržišnik's integration of organic and digital realms, an approach that transcended, in Potokar's words, "aesthetic, technical, and historical constraints of traditional orchestras." He described the music as "rhythmically unpredictable […] and multilayered"— one that "often merges the incompatible." Further, Mario Batelić from Odzven observed that, "… in places we have the impression that we are listening to industrial music …"

It was in this context that the composer introduced the album's main themes – freedom and free will. He postulated that lightning, a symbol of the cycles of creation and destruction, is not only a natural phenomenon but also a social one. He further questioned the extent to which we can control destructive social phenomena and problematized the power of human will in creating a more just society.

After several years of research, Kržišnik released the album Dancing Machine (2020). It addresses a new big era of human civilization – the information revolution. It focuses on what he considers the key moment of the new paradigm, namely the challenge of integrating human and artificial intelligence, and explores what the role of humans will be in the future, when AI will be increasingly dominant. Artificial intelligence is, as he put it, an extension of our intellect, which not only enables astonishing achievements and development of every aspect of our lives, but also brings challenges that have never existed before, and puts mankind in front of the imperative to redefine the notion of what it means to be human.

=== Collaborations ===
Borut Krzisnik has composed music for films, dance and theatre performances, and other productions. He worked intensely with British film director Peter Greenaway and wrote the score for films The Moab Story, Vaux to the Sea and A Life in Suitcases. The former two are the first and the second film of the trilogy The Tulse Luper Suitcases and the latter is trilogy's integral version.

The films narrate the stories of the life of Tulse Luper, the alter ego of the director himself, which intertwines with the events that marked the turbulent history of the twentieth century. An interesting fact that describes Greenaway's working process and his approach to music is that the composer is asked to compose the music before the start of shooting the film, and not after shooting and editing, as is usually the case. In this manner, Peter Greenaway analyzes the music before the start of the filming, which enables him to synchronize the whole process of shooting with the drive and development of the music.
The films were presented at numerous international film festivals including Cannes, Venice, Berlin, Rotterdam, Tribeca, Toronto, Montreal, Chicago, Philadelphia, Hong Kong, Moscow, and Edinburgh.

Kržišnik's collaboration with Greenaway also includes the following projects: The Greenaway Alphabet (documentary film, director: Saskia Boddeke, acting: Peter Greenaway), Reitdiep Joureys (documentary film/multimedia), Gold – 92 bars in a broken car (theater performance, director: Saskia Boddeke, libretto: Peter Greenaway), Grand Terp ("site-specific" installation), Sex and the Sea(multimedia installation), Compton Verney (installation) and Map to Paradise (installation).

In 2000, he started the collaboration with British-American-Brazilian theater and opera director Gerald Thomas. In the plays Nietzsche Contra Wagner (SESC, São Paulo, 2000) and Anchorpectoris – United States of the Mind (La MaMa, New York, 2004), music drives both performances, and by fusing different theatrical languages, co-creates Thomas’ outrageous, physical, absolute theater.

In 2007 the fruitful collaboration with the Romanian-born Slovenian choreographer Edward Clug started with the performance Sacre du Temps. It opened in Tilburg and shortly afterwards toured Netherlands, Belgium, France and Germany. The collaboration continued with Skitzen (2010), and Divine Comedy(2011), the latter staged at BITEF the same year. Songs for the Mating Season – Homage to Stravinsky(2012) premiered at SNG Maribor. It was performed at Festival Ljubljana a year later. In 2014, it was presented at Music Biennale Zagreb.

In the 90s, he worked closely with theater director Emil Hrvatin (later renamed to Janez Janša) and British director Julie Anne Robinson, who were present on European theatre stages in at the Piccolo Teatro in Milan, the Bush Theatre and the Royal National Theatre (educational programme) in London.

His collaborations also include the following artists: Thomas Noone, Ana Lujan Sanchez, Katarzyna Kozielska, Stefanie Nelson, Natalia Horecna, Isabelle Kralj, Felice Lesser, Josh Beamish, Virpi Pahkinen, Gyula Berger, Vinko Möderndorfer, Bojan Jablanovec, Borghesia and Laibach.

== Awards ==
- Vesna prize for best film music at Festival of Slovenian Film in 2008 (for the film Landscape No2)
- 1st prize at the Napoli Danza Festival in 1994 (for the music for art-video Labyrinth)).

== Opus ==
=== Albums ===
- Utopia – Claudio Records, UK, 2024
- Dancing Machine – Claudio Records, UK, 2020
- Lightning – Claudio Records, UK, 2013
- Valse Brutal – Claudio Records, UK, 2014 (KUD France Prešeren, 2009)
- Sacre du Temps – Claudio Records, 2013, UK (Station Zuid, Tilburg, 2007)
- A Life in Suitcases – Claudio Records, 2012 UK (First Name Soundtracks, London, 2006; KUD France Prešeren, 2005)
- Stories from Magatrea – Claudio Records, 2014, UK (Falcata-Galia Recordings, Realto, 1999, for Slovenia: KUD France Prešeren, Ljubljana, 1997)
- La Dolce Vita – Claudio Records, 2015 UK (FV, Ljubljana / Discordia, Willich, 1995)
- Currents of Time – Claudio Records, 2014 UK (ReR Megacorp, Point East, London, 1991; re-release: Tone Casualties, Hollywood, 1998)

=== Music for dance ===
- Fill in the Blank – contemporary dance performance, concept: Stefanie Nelson, choreography: Maya Orchin, Stefanie Nelson Dancegroup, New York, 2023
- Trap Ist – contemporary dance performance, choreography: Felice Lesser, Felice Lesser Dance Company, New York, 2023
- Metamorphosis – dance/theatre performance, directed and choreographed: Isabelle Kralj and Mark Anderson, Theatre Gigante, Milwaukee, 2018
- Take Your Pleasure Seriously – contemporary dance performance, choreography: Katarzyna Kozielska, Stuttgart Ballet, 2018
- Lightning – contemporary dance performance, choreography: Felice Lesser, Felice Lesser Dance Company, New York, 2017
- The Death That Best Preserves – contemporary dance performance, choreography: Natalia Horecna, The Royal Danish Theatre, Kobenhavn, 2015
- Waltz Epoca (Restless Creature) – contemporary dance performance, choreography: Joshua Beamish, New York, 2014
- Catch – contemporary dance performance, choreography: Ana Lujan Sanchez, Phoenix Dance Theatre, Leeds, 2012
- Songs for the mating season (Hommage a Stravinsky) – contemporary dance performance, choreography: Edward Clug, SNG Maribor, 12 April 2012
- Korona – contemporary dance performance, choreography: Virpi Pahkinen, Finnish National Opera and Ballet, Helsinki, 19 May 2011
- Divine Comedy – contemporary dance performance, choreography: Edward Clug, Bitef teatar in Budva grad teatar, 30 Jun 2011
- State celebration for the Independence day – contemporary dance performance, choreography: Edward Clug, Cankarjev dom, Ljubljana, 2011
- Glitch – contemporary dance performance, choreography: Thomas Noone, Thomas Noone Dance, Barcelona 2010
- Sketches – contemporary dance performance, choreography: Edward Clug, Opera Graz, 11 June 2010
- The Merry Metronomes – contemporary dance performance, choreography: Gyula Berger, Zero Balet, Budimpešta, 2010
- Proximity Spiral – contemporary dance performance (3 compositions), choreography: Stefanie Nelson, Stefanie Nelson Dancegroup, 19 March 2010
- The Tragedy of Maria Macabre – contemporary dance performance (1 composition), choreography: Rechel Klein, New York, 2010
- Sacre du Temps – contemporary dance performance, choreography: Edward Clug, Station Zuid, Tilburg, 2007
- File not Found – contemporary dance performance, choreography: Massimiliano Volpini, Bienale Zagreb, 2005
- I still don't know – contemporary dance performance, choreography: Isabelle Kralj, SNG Opera and ballet Ljubljana, 2005

=== Music for film ===
- The Greenaway Alphabet – documentary film, directed: Saskia Bodekke, BEELD/NTR, 2017
- Family album – documentary film, directed: Nishtha Jain, Raintree films, India, 2011
- Landscape No.2 – feature film, directed: Vinko Möderndorfer, Forum Ljubljana, 2008
- Paper Prince – feature film, director: Marko Kostić, Luksfilm, 2007
- Impression of a Great City – documentary film, directed: Amir Muratović, Slovenija, 2009
- Fabiani Plečnik – documentary film, directed: Amir Muratović, RTS, 2006
- A Life in Suitcases – feature film, directed: Peter Greenaway, Kasander Film, 2005
- The Moab Story (1st part of the trilogy The Tulse Luper Suitcases) – feature film, directed: Peter Greenaway, Kasander Film, 2003
- Vaux to the See (2nd part of the trilogy The Tulse Luper Suitcases) – feature film, directed: Peter Greenaway, Kasander Film, 2004
- The Reitdiep Journeys – documentary film, directed: Peter Greenaway, Dutch TV, 2001

=== Music for theatre ===
- Um Tartufo – theatre performance, directed: Bruce Gomlewski, CIA Teatro Esplendor, Rio de Janeiro, 2018
- She Who Remains Nameless – eclectic theatre performance, directed: Vlado Repnik, Kino Šiška, 2 October 2017
- Nein – theatre performance, director: Vlado Gotvan, Kino Šiška, 19 September 2016
- A Few Messages to the Universe – theatre performance, directed: Sebastjan Horvat, SNG Drama, 25 April 2014
- Pilowman (O Homem Travesseiro) – theatre performance, directed: Bruce Gomlevsky, Rio de Janeiro, 2011
- Anchorpectoris – theatre performance, directed: Gerald Thomas, La MaMa, New York, 6 March 2004
- Gold, 92 Golden Bars in the Crashed Car – theatre performance, directed: Saskia Boddeke, written: Peter Greenaway, Schaushpiel Frankfurt, 2001
- Nietzsche Contra Wagner – theatre performance, directed: Gerald Thomas, SESC, São Paulo, 2000
- Drive in Camillo – theatre performance, directed: Emil Hrvatin, Maska, Ljubljana, 2000
- Camillo – theatre performance, directed: Emil Hrvatin, Picollo Teatro, Milano, 7 May 1998
- Two Gentlemen of Verona – theatre performance, directed: Julie-Anne Robinson, Royal National Theatre, London 5 May 1999
- Yard – theatre performance, directed: Julie-Anne Robinson, Bush Theatre, London, 1998
- Romeo and Juliet – theatre performance, directed: Julie-Anne Robinson, C.F.T.C., Birmingham, 1996
- The New Organon – theatre performance, directed: Emil Hrvatin, Društvo 51, 11 June 1994
- The Woman Who Talks Incessantly – theatre performance, directed: Emil Hrvatin, Inart, 30 January 1993
- Romulus Veliki – theatre performance, directed: Bojan Jablanovec, Municipal Theatre, 12 March 1998
- Breakfast on the Lawn – theatre performance, directed & choreography: Nataša Kos, Maska, Ljubljana and Danswerkplaats, Amsterdam, 1 October 1994
- Hey, Salvador – theatre performance, directed: Matjaž Pograjc, Glej Theatre, 19 October 1991

=== Music for intermedia projects, performances, installations and exhibitions ===
- O – Project O, AV performance, Kiblix, KID Kibla, 2022, Maribor
- Shelters of Babylon – Project O, AV performance, Kiblix, KID Kibla, 2017, Maribor
- Sex and the Sea – installation by Peter Greenaway and Saskia Boddeke, Maritiem Museum, Rotterdam, 2013
- Compton Verney – performance, directed: Peter Greenaway, U.K., 2004
- Coordinates of Sound – Project O, video-audio-dance performance, series: Coordinates of sound: 11, Pritličje, Ljubljana, 19 April 2017
- Beyond – to the Freedom – Project O, video-audio-dance performance, Kino Šiška, 24 January 2017
- O – Project O, video-audio-dance performance, Cirkulacija 2, Ljubljana, 2016
- Grand Terp in Groningen – exhibition/installation, directed: Peter Greenaway, Kasander Film, Groningen, 2001
- Map to Paradise – exhibition / installation, directed: Peter Greenaway, Museum, Ljubljana, 2000
- The Labyrinth – art-video, directed: Marina Gržinič & Aina Šmid, RTV Slovenia, 1993

=== Compilations ===
- Dancing/Listening – Unknown Public, London, 2003
- Music for the Next Century – Tone Casualties, 1999
- Trans Slovenia Express Vol.1 – Dallas, Ljubljana, 1994

=== Live performances ===
- Love Song No.1 – Orchestra of Slovenian Philharmony, conductor: Marko Letonja, Cankarjev dom, 1998
- Questions – Enzo Fabiani quartet, Š.O.U. Ljubljana, 1997
- Fire – electronic performance, Narodni dom, Maribor, 2007
