= La Dolce Vita (Borut Kržišnik album) =

La Dolce Vita

Studio album by Borut Kržišnik and Data Direct
- Released: 1995, rereleased: February 2014
- Recorded: 1990–1991
- Studios: P. N. studios, Ljubljana
- Genres: Contemporary; avant-garde; eclecticism
- Length: 46:01
- Labels: Claudio Records; Discordia
- Producer: Borut Kržišnik

Borut Kržišnik and Data Direct chronology
Currents of Time (1991)	La Dolce Vita (1995)	Stories from Magatrea (1997)

La Dolce Vita is the second studio album by Slovenian composer Borut Kržišnik. Originally released in 1995 by the German label Discordia, it was reissued nearly two decades later (2012) by his long-term label Claudio Records (UK), under its division Claudio Contemporary.

The album was conceived and recorded with Data Direct, a group Kržišnik founded in 1993. The ensemble brought together Slovenian, Italian, and Serbian musicians, including clarinetist/saxophonist Mario Marolt and violinist Vuk Kraković, who had already collaborated on Kržišnik's debut album, Currents of Time.

The members drew from diverse musical backgrounds, including classical music, "avant-garde rock", electronic music, "improvisation", and "Balkan folk music". The group performed at various festivals including Druga Godba, 1993; Synthesis – Music of the 21st Century Festival, Skopje; 1994, Vorax, Vicenza, 1994, etc. After the release of the album, the band ceased activities.

== Context ==
Building on the foundational concepts of Currents of Time—such as eclecticism, spontaneous composition, and the interplay between written and improvised music—Data Direct further developed these ideas by emphasizing live performance as a driving force. They shifted freely across the spectrum between tonality and atonality, academic and popular music, and diverse genre conventions.

== Critical reception ==
La Dolce Vita drew attention for its synthesis of structured composition and improvisational energy. Jure Potokar of Razgledi described it as an "eclectic blend" of "contemporary serious music," noting its dynamic interplay between structured and chaotic centers of gravity. "It is deeply thought out and studied, but also extremely impulsive," wrote Rajko Muršič of Glasbena mladina, who also highlighted the album's polarization between "meticulous composition and raw spontaneity." Potokar likened the music to a "modern high-tech world of […] gleaming surfaces," where the "polished veneer […] merely conceals chaos, life persisting beneath." The British journal MFTEQ called it "organized mayhem."

== Track listing ==
No.	Title	Length
1.	"One Way"	6:40
2.	"Strange Attractor God"	7:41
3.	"The Play of the Puppets"	8:56
4.	"La Dolce Vita"	5:26
5.	"Hey"	6:28
6.	"Transformator"	4:13
7.	"Blind by Blood"	6:56

== Personnel ==
Musicians

- Mario Marolt – tenor saxophone, mouthpiece
- Vuk Krakovič – violin
- Borut Kržišnik – guitar, bass & drums programming
- Primoz Simončič – alt saxophone (#1, #7)
- Roman Dečman – brushes and cymbals (#3, # 5)

Guests

- Giovanni Maier – double bass (# 1, #2, #4, #5)
- Hugo Šekoranja – piano, soprano saxophone (#4)
- Aleksandra Rekar – piano (#4)

Production

- Composed and produced: Borut Kržišnik
- Recorded and mixed at P.N. Studios, Ljubljana, Slovenija, January – February 1995
- Recording engineer: Bac Kajuh
- Artistic adviser: Aleksandra Rekar
- Mastering: Colin Attwell
- Front cover painting: Marko Jakše
- Artwork: Miran Klenovšek

Label

- Claudio Records (division Claudio Contemporary)

== Reviews ==
- "Data Direct La Dolce Vita" (PDF). MFTEQ. No. 12. Ilford UK. August–September 1995. p. 80.
- Muršič, Rajko (June 1995). "La Dolce Vita" [La Dolce Vita]. Glasbena Mladina Slovenije (in Slovenian). Ljubljana. pp. 24–25. Archived from the original on 16 January 2014.
- Potokar, Jure (27 September 1995). "Hlad sladkega življenja" [The Chill of Sweet Life]. Razgledi (in Slovenian). Ljubljana: Delo. p. 36.
- Pistotnik, Zoran (5 September 1995). "Sladko življenje" [La Dolce Vita]. Dnevnik (in Slovenian). Ljubljana.
- Zadnikar, Miha (4 July 1995). "Data Direct: La Dolce Vita" [Data Direct: La Dolce Vita]. Mladina (in Slovenian). No. 51. Ljubljana. p. 49.

== Interviews ==
- Kus, Peter (August 2003). "Digitalne partiture virtualnih simfoničnih orkestrov" [Digital Scores of Virtual Simphonic Orchestras]. Muska (in Slovenian). Ljubljana.
- Poštrak, Milko (22 June 1995). "Sladko življenje" [The Sweet Life]. Dnevnik (in Slovenian). Ljubljana.
- Plahuta, Marko (26 June 1995). "Sprejemanje različnosti" [Embracing Diversity]. Republika (in Slovenian). Ljubljana.

== Other sources ==
- "Data Direct". www.culture.si/en. Culture.si.
- Gabrian, Pina (20 March 2021). "Borut Kržišnik: Živost glasbe oblikujemo prav z odstopanjem od popolne točnosti in uniformnosti" [Borut Kržišnik: We Shape the Liveliness of Music by Deviating from Perfect Accuracy and Uniformity]. MMC RTV SLO (in Slovenian). RTV Slovenija.

== External sources ==
- La Dolce Vita at AllMusic
- La Dolce Vita at Claudio Records
- Official website
