= Lightning (Borut Kržišnik album) =

Studio album by Borut Kržišnik
- Released: September 2013
- Recorded: 2013
- Studio: P. N. studios, Ljubljana
- Genre: contemporary; avant-garde; eclecticism
- Length: 49:47
- Label: Claudio Records (Claudio Contemporary)
- Producer: Borut Kržisnik

Borut Kržišnik chronology
Valse Brutal (2009)	Lightning (2013)	Dancing Machine (2020)

Lightning is the seventh album by Slovenian composer Borut Kržišnik. It was released by the British label Claudio Records, division Claudio Contemporary, in 2013. Kržišnik composed and performed it at his P.N. studio in 2011 and 2012.

== Context ==
The album's concept, as defined by Anže Zorman of Radio Student, is based on the duality of the "inherent violence and explosiveness of creation on one side, and the tendency to master it on the other." In interviews with Večer, Kržišnik explored the album's central theme of freedom and free will, reflecting on society's capacity to control its destructive forces and reexamining the potential of human will to create a more just society. "How far can we reach with our will?" he asked, framing the discussion in terms of two visions of liberty: negative freedom ("freedom from" oppression, requiring resistance to constraints) and positive freedom ("freedom for" self-realization, demanding cooperation and creativity).

This concept, first introduced by Russian-British philosopher and social political theorist Isaiah Berlin in 1958, served as a framework for Kržišnik's reflections. While negative freedom necessitates confrontation with oppressive structures, positive freedom—which he emphasized as essential for progress—calls for building inclusive systems that enable collective flourishing. For Kržišnik, as explained in his interview in Dnevnik, this latter vision represented not just a philosophical ideal, but a pragmatic foundation for lasting peace.

== Critical reception ==
Jure Potokar of Polet described the album as "his most complex work", portraying it as "rhythmically unpredictable […] and multilayered" - one that "often merges the incompatible". Turning to its methodology, he argued that digital technology allows composers to not only write a score but also audition, refine, and fully realize its performance and sound—effectively enabling them to act as "composer, performer, and producer simultaneously." Potokar explained how this approach integrates organic and digital domains, transcending "aesthetic, technical, and historical constraints of traditional orchestras" (such as extreme registers, complex rhythms, and unconventional performance techniques), thereby redefining musical expression.

In his review titled "Tangible Virtuality" for Odzven, Mario Batelić observed that Kržišnik's music "establishes its distinctive style and sound through intensity and charge". He further noted that the album, in some places, "evokes 1980s industrial music at its peak". Acknowledging that "industrial artists of that era relied on pounding metal, not strings or orchestras", he argued: "Unlike proponents of the industrial aesthetic, Kržišnik's music— though equally powerful and noisy—feels slightly more direct, even though it unfolds without lyrics or vocals."

Tine Vučko of Nova Muska described it as "complex", "urgent" and "overwhelming" but still "filled with a bright and hopeful energy." Analyzing the album's broader cultural resonance, Anže Zorman of Radio Student described its thematic progression as unfolding through "sparks, bursts of energy, cyclical processes of destruction and creation, and—finally—revolutionary potential and tradition."

== Track listing ==
No.	Title	Length
1.	"Persistence of Flesh"	6:36
2.	"Invisible Borders"	5:35
3.	"Breakthrough"	7:39
4.	"Memory Prism"	7:21
5.	"Unrest"	8:22
6.	"Holy Ignorance"	4:16
7.	"Rules of Disorder"	6:33
8.	"Crack in the Sky"	2:27

== Personnel ==
Musicians:

- Borut Kržišnik – virtual orchestra
- Klemen Bračko – violin (introduction in #7)

Production:

- Composed and produced: Borut Kržišnik
- Recorded and mixed at P.N. Studios, Ljubljana, Slovenia, September 2013
- Recording engineer: Bac Kajuh
- Artistic adviser: Aleksandra Rekar
- Artwork: TBT design

Label:

- Claudio Records (div. Claudio Contemporary)

== Reviews ==
- Potokar, Jure (28 October 2013). "Virtualni orkester, realna glasba" [Virtual Orchestra, Real Music]. Delo (in Slovenian). No. 20 (Pogledi ed.). Ljubljana. p. 21.
- Batelić, Mario (1 July 2013). "Otipljiva virtualnost" [Tangible Virtuality]. Odzven (in Slovenian). Ljubljana: SIGIC.
- Zorman, Anže (2 June 2013). "Borut Kržišnik: Lightning". Radio Študent. Tolpa bumov (in Slovenian).
- Krivokapič, Igor (26 May 2013). "Glasbeni portret Boruta Kržišnika" [Music Portrait of Borut Kržišnik]. 3. program, Program ARS (in Slovenian). RTV SLO. Event occurs at 20:15. Archived from the original on 25 February 2025.
- Vučko, Tine (17 October 2013). "Borut Kržišnik: Lightning" [Borut Kržišnik: Lightning]. Nova Muska (in Slovenian). Ljubljana.
- Smasek, Uroš (24 May 2013). "Borut Kržišnik: Lightning" [Borut Kržišnik: Lightning] (PDF). Večer (in Slovenian). Maribor. Archived (PDF) from the original on 28 April 2025.

== Sources ==
- Berlin, Isaiah (1969). "Four Essays on Liberty". Liberty. Oxford: Oxford University Press. pp. 118–172. ISBN 9780199249893.

== Interviews ==
- Maličev, Patricija (14 September 2013). "Je šepet, ki preglasi glasen orkester, nemuzikalen?" [Is a Whisper, Overriding a Loud Orchestra, Unmusical?]. Delo (in Slovenian) (Sobotna priloga ed.). Ljubljana.
- Valetinčič, Mateja (24 September 2013). "Borut Kržišnik in Strela - ne le naravni, ampak tudi fascinanten družbeni pojav" [Borut Kržišnik and Lightning - Not Only a Natural, but Also a Fascinating Social Phenomenon]. Glasba (in Slovenian). MMC RTV SLO.
- Petrovec, Janko (2 June 2013). "Borut Kržišnik". Neobvezno v nedeljo (in Slovenian). RTV SLO. Event occurs at 20:00-22:00. Radio Slovenija, 1. Program.
- Bauman, Gregor (24 October 2013). "Mejniki v procesu grajenja in rušenja" [Milestones in the Process of Creation and Demolition]. Dnevnik (in Slovenian). Ljubljana. Archived from the original on 28 February 2025.
- Fele, Jolanda (30 October 2013). "Na piedestal: Borut Kržišnik" [On the Pedestal: Borut Kržišnik]. On the pedestal (in Slovenian). Event occurs at 22:30. Radio Slovenija. 2. program, Val 202.
- Smasek, Uroš (15 June 2013). "Iskrenje vidimo povsod" [There is Sparking Everywhere] (PDF). Večer (in Slovenian). Maribor. Archived from the original (PDF) on 28 April 2025.
