= Sacre du Temps =

Studio album by Borut Kržišnik
- Released: 2007, rerelease: November 2013
- Recorded: 2007
- Studio: P. N. studios, Ljubljana
- Genre: sodobna glasba; avantgardna glasba; eklekticizem
- Length: 49:42
- Label: Claudio Records (div. Claudio Contemporary), Station Zuid
- Producer: Borut Kržišnik

Borut Kržišnik chronology
| A Life in Suitcases (2005) | Sacre du Temps (2007) | Valse Brutal (2009) |

Sacre du Temps is the fifth studio album by Slovenian avant-garde composer Borut Kržišnik. Originally released by Station Zuid (Tilburg) in 2007, it was reissued in 2013 by Claudio Contemporary Records. The album comprises the score for the eponymous dance performance choreographed by Slovenian-Romanian choreographer Edward Clug. Developed from January to October 2007 through a Dutch-Slovenian collaboration, the performance premiered in Heerlen, Netherlands, in October 2007. It subsequently toured for two months across the Netherlands, Belgium, and Germany, concluding in Maastricht that December.

A reworked version of the production, titled Songs for the Mating Season, was performed at the 2013 Music Biennale Zagreb.

== Context ==
The contextual framework of the performance is time and duality between its objective manifestation and subjective experience. The performance embodies the objective time as a "shared, clock-measured time", as an absolute frame of reference through which individual characteristics are contrasted and periodically synchronized. Employing rhythms across a spectrum—from free, indeterminate rhythms to precisely synchronized polyrhythmic orchestrations— the music guides dancers through distinct levels of coordination. These include sections ranging from chaotic individualism, through malleable interplay (a 'softening and melting' fluidity where, in Zagorčnik's words, 'all partial differences dissolve'), to precise collective unification. In doing so, the performance interrogates the dynamics between individuality and conformity, particularly in the context of modern-era social phenomena and the "industrialization" of social rituals.

== Critical reception ==
In his review in Muska, Ičo Vidmar analyzed the album within the context of a historical debate concerning technology's impact on music, particularly its effect on the relationship between score and performance. Vidmar contrasted the immediacy and authenticity valued in live performance with the studio-based approach of composers utilizing technology to achieve a "perfect interpretation," positioning Kržišnik firmly in the latter category. He likened Kržišnik's approach to that of Glenn Gould in his late period, characterizing it as a method to operate free from the constraints and hierarchies inherent in traditional ensembles. Vidmar also noted controversy arising from a performance of The Love Song No 1 by the Slovenian Philharmonic Orchestra, reportedly due to the technical demands and intricate detail of the score – characteristics potentially stemming from Kržišnik's studio-centric composition process.

Vidmar described the music as propelling its virtual orchestra through "demanding, frenetic passages," shifting between "dizzying fragmentation," "rhythmic mischievousness," and evocative power. According to him, despite serving a functional purpose for movement, the music "asserts its independence and playful complexity," breaking free from background constraints.

Ivana Mikuličin of Jutarnji list described Edward Clug’s choreography as featuring "interestingly sprained" movement. Separately, Uroš Smasek of Večer highlighted two aspects of Kržišnik’s score: the "fierce" rhythm in certain compositions, and the "poetic" energy in others—"rhythmically punctuated in Kržišnik’s signature style." In a contemporaneous interview, Kržišnik elaborated to Smasek on his use of indeterminate rhythms and broader fascination with coincidence, stating: "...sometimes an unexpected spark or pure chance does better than your own carefully thought-out intention," and mused, "...we have to take coincidence more seriously."

== Track listing ==
Sacre du Temps track listing
| No. | Title | Length |
|---|---|---|
| 1. | "Intelligent Body" | 4:42 |
| 2. | "Love Song No. 2" | 4:34 |
| 3. | "Paths of Coincidence" | 4:36 |
| 4. | "Love Song No. 1" | 5:07 |
| 5. | "March to Eternity" | 8:47 |
| 6. | "Codes and Signs" | 5:47 |
| 7. | "Procedures" | 5:04 |
| 8. | "Fire" | 6:20 |
| 9. | "Love Song No. 3" | 4:43 |

== Personnel ==
Musicians:

- Borut Kržišnik - virtual orchestra
- Mario Marolt - clarinet (#1, #4)
- Vuk Kraković - violin (#7)

Production:

- Composed and produced: Borut Kržišnik
- Artistic adviser: Aleksandra Rekar
- Recording engineer: Bac Kajuh
- Recording engineer assistant: Turob Tušek
- Recorded and mixed at P.N. Studios, Ljubljana, Slovenia, 2007
- Mastering: Colin Attwell, except tracks #4 & #5: Simon Heyworth (Super Audio Mastering)
- Front cover photo: Gemmy van Linden
- Artwork: Merijn Klerx, MKGO

Label:

- Claudio Records (div. Claudio Contemporary)

== Reviews ==
- "Borut Kržišnik je v glasbo ujel čas" [Borut Kržišnik Captured Time in Music]. Kultura (in Slovenian). RTV Slovenija. 11 January 2008.
- Vidmar, Ičo (March–April 2008). "Borut Kržišnik: Sacre du Temps" [Borut Kržišnik: Sacre du Temps]. Muska (in Slovenian). Ljubljana: Društvo za raziskovanje popularne glasbe.
- Šrot, Tina (30 April 2012). "Borut Kržišnik: Sacre du Temps" [Borut Kržišnik: Sacre du Temps]. Delo (in Slovenian) (Pogledi ed.). Ljubljana: Delo.
- Vidmar, Ičo (5 February 2008). "Borut Kržišnik: Sacre du Temps" [Borut Kržišnik: Sacre du Temps]. Mladina (in Slovenian). Ljubljana: Mladina.
- "Novi album avantgardnega umetnika Boruta Kržišnika" [New album by avant-garde artist Borut Kržišnik]. Glasba in film (in Slovenian). SIOL. 22 January 2008.
- Smasek, Uroš (5 February 2008). "Poetične ljubezenske pesmi" [Poetic Love Songs] (PDF). Večer (in Slovenian). Maribor: Večer mediji d.o.o. p. 12.

== Interviews ==
- Zagoričnik, Luka (6 May 2008). "Skladanje kot raziskovanje" [Composition as Research]. Delo (in Slovenian). Ljubljana: Delo. p. 14. Archived from the original on 26 August 2020.

== Other sources ==
- Smasek, Uroš (9 February 2008). "Zakaj je nepričakovana iskra boljša od premišljene namere" [Why Is an Unexpected Spark Better than a Deliberate Intention]. Večer (in Slovenian). Maribor: Večer mediji d.o.o. p. 56.
