= The Coastline =

- Directed by: Peter Greenaway
- Release date: 1983
- Country: United Kingdom
- Language: English

This entry describes a film. For information on the geographic feature 'coastline', please see coast.

The Coastline is a film by Peter Greenaway, made in 1983. It is also known as The Sea in Their Blood, and exhibited at the National Maritime Museum, Greenwich, London, as Beside the Sea. It is a mockumentary or "artificial documentary", featuring images of the British seaside and voiceovers of endless unsubstantiated statistics. For example: "Most fish is eaten in Britain fried in batter and breadcrumbs. 10 percent is boiled, 5 percent grilled, 3 percent is steamed. Very little is eaten raw except by cats and in Japanese restaurants, 29 in London and 1 in Milton Keynes."

== Sources ==
Produced by Annabel Olivier Wright
