= Gerald Thomas (theatre director) =

American stage director and dramatist

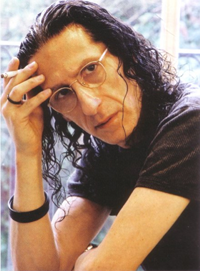
- Born: Gerald Thomas Sievers; July 1, 1954 (age 72); New York City, U.S.
- Occupations: Playwright, Opera and Theater Director

Gerald Thomas Sievers, best known as simply Gerald Thomas (born July 1, 1954, New York City) is a theatre and opera director and playwright who has spent his life in the United States, England, Brazil and Germany. After graduating as a reader of philosophy at the British Museum Reading Room, Thomas began his life in the theater at Ellen Stewart's La MaMa E.T.C. in New York City. During this period Thomas became an illustrator for the Op-Ed page of the New York Times while conducting workshops at La MaMa E.T.C. where he adapted and directed world premieres of Samuel Beckett's prose and dramatic pieces.

In the early 80s, Thomas began working with Beckett himself in Paris (after a lot of correspondence between them for almost two years), adapting new fiction by the author. Of these, the more notorious were All Strange Away and That Time starring the Living Theatre founder, Julian Beck in his only stage acting role outside of his own company.

In the mid-80s, Thomas became involved with German author Heiner Müller, directing his works in the US and Brazil, and began a long-term partnership with American composer Philip Glass.

In 1985 Thomas formed and established his Dry Opera Company, in São Paulo. It performed in 15 countries up until 2008 (see list of works below).

In 2000, Thomas created the theatrical production Nietzsche Contra Wagner a collaboration with Slovenian composer Borut Kržišnik. They worked together again on the 2004 performance Anchorpectoris – United States of the Mind.

In 2009 he wrote a manifesto declaring his "goodbye-to-theater" yet, in 2010, Thomas announced to Stage News that he was to set up his Dry Opera Company in London. Its first production, "Throats," written and directed by Thomas, began performances at the Pleasance Theater in Islington on Feb. 18, 2011.

In 2016, Thomas's autobiography "Between Two Lines" or "Entre Duas Fileiras", was released by Grupo Editorial Record. The blurb on the back cover was by Oscar Nominee and Golden Globe winner Fernanda Montenegro (and protagonist of Thomas's "The Flash and Crash Days") writes : "Gerald Thomas exists by virtue of his devastating quality, his inconstancy, his nonconformity, his aggressiveness, his faith laden disbelief, his life affirming death cult; through his clear and powerful incongruence; by laughing and crying like an innocent and somehow ominous child, by loving the neighbor he hates; by being an unexpectedly good, adorable boy and friend; by accepting and forswearing you in seconds; by loving you madly, by cursing you while blessing you; for his devilish, eternal and nonconformist Art is monstrously creative. His Art is unique upon our stages and in our lives. If you have seen or experienced it, it will remain unforgotten."

On November 11, 2017, Thomas opened his new production “Diluvio” at SESC Anchieta- Consolação, in São Paulo, Brazil, after a three-year absence from the theater. Cast: Maria de Lima, Lisa Giobbi, Julia Wilkins, Ana Gabi, Beatrice Sayd, Isabella Lemos, André Bortolanza, Ronaldo Zero, Wagner Pinto and Dora Leão.

== Supreme Court Case ==
In August 2003, Thomas directed a performance of Tristan und Isolde at the Teatro Municipal do Rio de Janeiro, the city's main opera house. It was a nontraditional production in that the action was set in the office of Sigmund Freud—himself a character on stage, tossing cocaine in the air at one point—and made references to drug trafficking and violence in Rio. During the curtain calls following one performance, the audience spared the cast but jeered at Thomas. In response, he turned his back to them and lowered his pants and underwear, mooning the audience and simulating the act of masturbation.

The Rio de Janeiro chief of police, who was in the audience that evening, filed a report against Thomas under Article 233 of the Brazilian Penal Code, which criminalizes "carrying out an obscene act in a public place, or in a place open or exposed to the public" and prescribes a sentence of three months to one year of imprisonment. After Thomas refused an attempt by the Rio de Janeiro state prosecutors to settle the case out of court by paying a fine, his formal indictment was approved by the Rio de Janeiro Court of Justice.

The following year, the Supreme Federal Court accepted and ruled on a petition for habeas corpus in favor of Thomas, granting it on 17 August 2004 and ordering the dismissal of the criminal case against him. The petition was decided by a five-member panel of the court. Justice Joaquim Barbosa recused himself on the grounds that he had not attended the session during which the case was presented. Justices Carlos Velloso and Ellen Gracie voted to deny the request; justices Gilmar Mendes and Celso de Mello voted to grant it. As the vote was 2–2, Mello, the panel's chair, applied Article 150, paragraph 3 of the Supreme Federal Court's internal rules, which state that in the event of a tie in a habeas corpus decision, the ruling should favor the beneficiary.

In his vote in favor of the petition, Justice Mendes argued that the context of the act should be considered—a reaction to a dissatisfied audience after a theatrical performance—and thus unlikely to have offended the public's sense of decency. "An objective analysis of the dispute," he wrote in his vote, "must indicate that the matter is entirely within the scope of freedom of expression, even if inappropriate or ill-mannered." He also noted that modern society possesses mechanisms to address such situations, rendering criminal prosecution unnecessary.

Justice Mello, also voting in favor, argued that the established legal interpretation of Article 233 of the Penal Code required that the alleged lewd act should be sexual in nature. Noting that the concept of lewdness varies with time and location, and that he would "tend to recognize it as more a manifestation, albeit rude, of [Thomas's] freedom of expression in reaction to the jeers".

In her vote against, Justice Gracie cited the example of Victor Hugo, who "adopted an attitude of humility in face of those who, at the time, failed to comprehend the innovations brought on by his creations".

== Works ==
2025

- November - Opened his own play “SABIUS, os MOLEQUES” at SESC 14BIS starring Fabiana Gugli, Jefferson Schroeder, Apollo Faria, Nilson Muniz and Pedro UInio, on November 26.
- In the middle of November, Thomas headed up north towards Teresina, state of Piaui to direct the 40th anniversary of the Theater Company “HAREM”, in a collage of their historical plays named “HAREM CONTA HAREM” at Theatro 4 de Setembro. This group bears the legacy of the founding father of the Tropicalista movement, Torquato Neto. He also conducted a 5-day workshop in São Luis, state of Maranhão, in Brazil's oldest theater, Theatro Arthur Azevedo before returning home to New York on Christmas Day.
- October - Directed and adapted “Searching for Signs of Intelligent Life in the Universe” by author Janet Wagner, starring Danielle Winits on October 2 at the Copacabana Palace Theater, Rio de Janeiro.
- Conducted two open readings of his own play, written specifically for Ana Cecilia Costa at the Instituto Brasileiro de Teatro in São Paulo on October 28 and 29.

2023

- 18 November - “TRAIDOR” opened at SESC Vila Mariana São Paulo to a fully sold-out run thru the end of December. Thomas's play written specifically for actor Marco Nanini is already considered to be his “scandalous success” on all levels; political, social, ethical and, of course, theatrical.

2022

- F.E.T.O. (Fetus) opened on July 26, 2022. It is Thomas's second play to have opened in 2022. “G.A.L.A” (a solo written for Fabiana Gugli) opened at the Curitiba Theater Festival in March 2022. F.E.T.O. is conceived and directed by Gerald Thomas and loosely based on “Doroteia” (1949), a play by Nelson Rodrigues, Lights are by Wagner Pinto, Music by Jørgen Teller, Ale Martins and Eduardo Agni. Cast: Lisa Giobbi, Fabiana Gugli, Rodrigo Pandolfo, Bea Sayd, Ana Gabi and Raul Barretto. Produced by Dora Leão (PlatoProduções) presented by SESC- SP.
- On March 29, 2022, Gerald Thomas's “G.A.L.A.” live version for the stage opened the 30th anniversary Curitiba Theater Festival, Brazil with a sonorous 6 minute standing ovation. “Blog do Arcanjo” wrote: “Gerald Thomas – assumes himself as a wandering Don Quixote in these fleeting, highly digitized contemporary times. His “G.A.L.A.” starring Fabiana Gugli is a brilliant synthesis of time, so necessary in this increasingly impatient world. Gerald Thomas knows like no one else how to stage highly impactful images leading up to glorious moments of pure sensitivity and outright destruction, thus sharing with the public an incessant search for some sense.”

2021

- In 2021, a movie version of “Terra em Transito” aired throughout the months of April and May. Gerald Thomas is strongly engaged in working within the virtual platform, given the uncertainties of the future.A historical live streamed talk with CUNY in June, made that point very clear.
- In September 2021, Thomas also world premiered his new “G.A.L.A.” (a movie/ play streamed online via SESC - SP). “G.A.L.A.” was written and performed by Fabiana Gugli.

2020

- In 2020 Gerald revisited his production from 2006, “Terra Em Transito” (Earth in Trance), which very successfully began this COVID-19 related need for live streaming theatrical works. This version was a SESC-SP production. He also took part in over 20 live streamed interviews, conferences and workshops. His lifetime achievement television came in August with the broadcasting of his life in “Persona Em Foco”, by TV Cultura, São Paulo.

2019

- In December 2019 Gerald Thomas launches a compilation of 24 of his plays staged worldwide (“Circo de Rins e Figados”) published by SESC Editions in São Paulo and in Rio. This book is partially bilingual.

2018

- On November 24, 2018, Gerald Thomas opened S.O.L.O. at the Dansekapellet in Copenhagen, Denmark. This piece was commissioned by composer Jørgen Teller and performed by Gerald himself plus partner Lisa Giobbi. It was to be a brief staged reading (a reduced compilation from his autobiography Between Two Lines), but turned out to be a full evening of drama, comedy and dance thanks to this partnership with Lisa. Lighting was done by Gerald's long term lighting designer Peter Glatz (Danish).

2017

- On November 11, 2017, Gerald Thomas opened his new production “Diluvio” at SESC Anchieta- Consolação, in São Paulo, Brazil

2016

- In 2016, Thomas's autobiography "Between Two Lines" is released by Grupo Editorial Record. The blurb on the back cover is by Oscar Nominee Fernanda Montenegro writes: "Gerald Thomas exists by virtue of his devastating quality, his inconstancy, his nonconformity, his aggressiveness, his faith laden disbelief, his life affirming death cult; His Art is unique upon our stages and in our lives. If you have seen or experienced it, it will remain unforgotten."

2014

- On April 10, 2014, Gerald Thomas premiered his "Entredentes" at SESC-Anchieta (São Paulo), featuring Ney Latorraca, Edi Botelho and Maria de Lima. According to Folha de S.Paulo, this marks the rebirth of GT as a great author and director. "Entredentes" features new music by Philip Glass and compositions by GT himself. In October of the same year, Entredentes opened at Teatro SESC Rio Ginastico, Rio de Janeiro.

2013

- Launched two books: "Scratching the Surface " (Arranhando a Superficie) - of drawings and paintings and "Citizen of the World" (Cidadão do Mundo) a biography published by Coleção Aplauso.

Sexually assaulted a reporter, Nicole Bahls, at a book signing in Leblon, south of Rio.

2012

- Toured "Gargolios 2.0" with the London Dry Opera Company to the Curitiba International Theater Festival and did a two-week-long workshop for professional theater people at Teatro Poeira, Rio de Janeiro.

2011

- Gargólios - written and directed by Gerald Thomas for the London Dry Opera Co., Daniella Visco - movement director, actors Angus Brown, Antonia Davies, Lucy Laing, Maria de Lima, Adam Napier, and Daniel Ben Zenou. Musical score by John Paul Jones & Gerald Thomas. Presented in association with and premiered July 9, 2011 at SESC Vila Mariana, São Paulo, Brazil in English with Portuguese supertitles.
- Throats - written and directed by Gerald Thomas for the London Dry Opera Co., Daniella Visco - movement director, actors Angus Brown, Antonia Davies, Kevin Golding, Lucy Laing, Maria de Lima, Adam Napier, and Daniel Ben Zenou. The musical score includes a special piano solo by John Paul Jones. Presented in association with the Pleasance Theater, Islington, London, UK.

2008

- Bait Man - written and directed by Gerald Thomas, with Marcelo Olinto of the Cia. dos Atores, lighting & stage design by Caetano Vilela, original music & sound design by Patrick Grant, sponsored by Petrobras and SESC Rio de Janeiro - Rio de Janeiro, Brazil
- BlogNovela: "O Cão que Insultava as Mulheres, Kepler, The Dog!" - written and directed by Gerald Thomas, with: Fabiana Gugli, Pancho Capelletti, Duda Mamberti, Anna Americo, Luciana Froes, Simone Martins, Caca Manica. Lights: Caetano Vilela, Sound: Claudia Dorei, Production: Plato Productions (Dora Leão), assistant director: Ivan Andrade. Produced by SESC Unidade Av. Paulista and Videotaped by TV IG

2007

- Queen Liar (Rainha Mentira) - written and directed by Gerald Thomas - Brazil and Argentina
- Luartrovado (a funk opera adapted from Arnold Schoenberg's "Pierrot Lunaire") SESC Pinheiros June 2007
- Breve Interrupção performed at Satyrianas 2007, produced by Cia. de Teatro Os Satyros. Gerald Thomas ties up the critics Alberto Guzik and Sergio Coelho Video on YouTube

2006

- Earth in Trance (Terra em Trânsito) - written and directed by Gerald Thomas - São Paulo/Brazil and La MaMa E.T.C., NYC
- Asphalt over a Kiss (Asfaltaram o Beijo) - written and directed by Gerald Thomas - São Paulo/Brazil
- A Cube of Ice in Flames (Um Bloco de Gelo em Chamas) - written and directed by Gerald Thomas - São Paulo/Brazil
- Ashes in the Freezer (Brasas no Congelador) - written and directed by Gerald Thomas - São Paulo/Brazil

The above pieces comprise a tetralogy, produced by SESC - São Paulo with a sponsorship from Eletrobras

2005

- A Circus of Kidneys and Livers (Um Circo de Rins e Fígados) - written and directed by Gerald Thomas and starring Marco Nanini - Brazil and Argentina

2004

- Anchorpectoris - written and directed by Gerald Thomas - La MaMa E.T.C., NYC

2003

- Tristan und Isolde - opera staged by Gerald Thomas - Rio de Janeiro Opera House/Brazil - a new version, different from that of the Weimar production of 1996 which resulted in the "mooning case" after a very controversial opening.

2002

- Deus Ex-Machina - written and directed by Gerald Thomas - Brazil

2001

- Prince of Copacabana - written and directed by Gerald Thomas for Reinaldo Giannecchini - Brazil

2000

- Nietzsche Contra Wagner (SESC - São Paulo) - written and directed by Gerald Thomas - Brazil
- Waiting for Beckett - written and directed by Gerald Thomas, written for Marilia Gabriela - Brazil
- Rave Party Tragedy - written and directed by Gerald Thomas - Brazil
- "Ventriloquist 2.0 (Rio de Janeiro version) opened at Espaço Sergio Porto.

1999

- Ventriloquist - written and directed by Gerald Thomas - Brazil (four years in repertoire)
- Raw War (by Karlheinz Stockhausen and Paulo Chagas) - opera staged by Gerald Thomas - Bonn Opera House/Germany

1998

- Moses und Aron (by Arnold Schoenberg) - opera staged by Gerald Thomas - Graz Opera/Austria

1997

- Lorca on a Truck: Le Chien Andaluz (produced by SESC - São Paulo) written and directed by Gerald Thomas - Brazil (toured 32 cities)
- Babylon (by Detlef Heusinger) - libretto and direction by Gerald Thomas (commissioned by the Deutsches National Theater Mannheim and the Schwetzingen Festival) /Germany
- Graal - a Portrait of a Faust as a Young Man (by Haroldo de Campos) - directed by Gerald Thomas - Brazil
- A Brief Interruption of the End (dance piece) - written and directed by Gerald Thomas - Brazil. Article by Haroldo de Campos
- A Brief Interruption of Hell - written and designed by Gerald Thomas
- A Hard Days' Night - written and directed by Gerald Thomas - Brazil

1996

- Chief Butterknife - written and directed by Gerald Thomas for the Danish Company Dr. Dante Aveny (they later became known as the Dogma 95 film movement)
- Nowhere Man - written and directed by Gerald Thomas - toured Brazil, Denmark and Croacia
- Tristan und Isolde (by Richard Wagner) - opera staged by Gerald Thomas - Deutsches National Theater Weimar/Germany

1995

- Don Juan (by Otavio Frias Filho) - directed by Gerald Thomas - Brazil
- Zaide (an unfinished opera by Mozart, completed by Luciano Berio) - opera directed by Gerald Thomas - opened at Maggio Musicale in Florence and toured eight European capitals
- Dr. Faust - an opera by Ferruccio Busoni, directed by Gerald Thomas - Graz Opera/Austria

1994

- Narcissus (by Beat Furrer) - a world premiere opera directed by Gerald Thomas - Graz Opera/Austria
- Unglauber (produced by SESC São Paulo) written and directed by Gerald Thomas - Brazil, Portugal and Copenhagen/Denmark
- Sorriso do Gato de Alice: Gal Costa's Show - conceived, written and directed by Gerald Thomas - Brazil and world tour 1995/96/97

1993

- Empire of Half Truths - written and directed by Gerald Thomas - Brazil, Portugal, Hamburg/Germany, Switzerland and Copenhagen/Denmark

1992

- Saints and Clowns - written and directed by Gerald Thomas - commissioned by Kampnagel's Fabrik Theatre (Hamburg) and Lausanne. It was performed back to back with The Flash and Crash Days

1991

- The Flash and Crash Days - written and directed by Gerald Thomas - toured 18 cities in Brazil, Germany, Switzerland, Denmark, Portugal, Italy and Lincoln Center/NY. It was televised by NDR 3 (German television)
- M.O.R.T.E. 2 - written and directed by Gerald Thomas - international tour included Zurich, Rome and Taormina Festival/Italy- written and directed by Gerald Thomas - international tour included Zurich, Rome and Taormina Festival/Italy

1990

- Warten auf Godot (Waiting for Godot) by Samuel Beckett - directed by Gerald Thomas - Cuvillies Thaeater - Munich State Theater/Germany
- The Said Eyes of Kalheinz Ohl written and directed by Gerald Thomas - commissioned by Pontedera and Volterra/Italy (Grotowsky's company)
- -M.O.R.T.E. (Obsessive and Redundant Movements for So Much Aesthetics) - written and directed by Gerald Thomas - Brazil
- Endgame (by Samuel Beckett) - directed by Gerald Thomas - Brazil
- Perseo and Andromeda (by Salvatore Sciarrino) - world premiere opera staged by Gerald Thomas - Stuttgart Opera House (dramaturg: Klaus Peter Kehr)

1989

- Mattogrosso (collaboration with Philip Glass) - libretto and direction by Gerald Thomas - toured Rio Opera House, São Paulo Opera House and Tokyo
- Sturmspiel - world premiere written and directed by Gerald Thomas - commissioned by the Munich State Theater (Cuvillies Theater)

1988

- Kafka Trilogy (A Process, Metamorphosis and Praga)- written and directed by Gerald Thomas - Brazil, La MaMa E.T.C., NYC and Wiener Festwochen /Vienna 1989 These pieces were broadcast by ORF (Austrian State TV) and parts of it on PBS. In the following years these pieces toured the world
- Carmen com Filtro 2.5 - written and directed by Gerald Thomas - Brazil, La MaMa/NY, Munich and Wiener Festwochen /Vienna 1989

1987

- The Flying Dutchman (by Richard Wagner) - opera staged by Gerald Thomas Rio de Janeiro Opera House/Brazil. It was broadcast live by TV Cultura in Brazil and Germany

1986

- Eletra Com Creta - written and directed by Gerald Thomas - staged at the Museum of Modern Art, Rio de Janeiro, and toured Brazil (this play establishes the birth of the Dry Opera Company)

1985

- Quartett (by Heiner Mueller) - directed by Gerald Thomas - Theater for the New City, NYC - with George Bartenieff and Crystal Field
- Quartett - Brazil with Tonia Carreiro and Sergio Britto
- Carmem Com Filtro - written and directed by Gerald Thomas - Brazil
- Beckett Trilogy (Theater 1, Theater2 and That Time) (by Samuel Beckett) - directed by Gerald Thomas - featuring Julian Beck - La MaMa E.T.C., NYC, Theater am Turm (TAT) in Frankfurt and Belgrade Festival/Serbia
- Four Times Beckett (Quatro Vezes Beckett) (Theater 1, Theater 2, Nothing and That Time) (by Samuel Beckett) - directed by Gerald Thomas - Brazil

1984

- All Strange Away 1 (by Samuel Beckett) - world premiere of prose adapted and directed by Gerald Thomas - La MaMa E.T.C., NYC (actor: Ryan Cutrona)
- All Strange Away 2 (by Samuel Beckett) - directed by Gerald Thomas - The Harold Clurman Theater/NY (actor: Robert Langdon Lloyd)
