= Valse Brutal =

Studio album by Borut Kržišnik
- Released: 2009; rereleased: December 2014
- Recorded: 2009
- Studio: P. N. studios, Ljubljana
- Genre: contemporary; avant-garde; eclecticism
- Length: 46:20
- Label: Claudio Records
- Producer: Borut Kržišnik

Borut Kržišnik chronology
Sacre du Temps (2005)	Valse Brutal (2009)	Lightning (2013)

Valse Brutal is the sixth album by Slovenian composer Borut Kržišnik, released in 2009 by Claudio Records (division Claudio Contemporary). It was composed and produced at P.N. studios in Ljubljana in 2008.

The album comprises seven compositions marked by turbulent dynamics and extreme articulations of agitation and rage. Performed solely by Kržišnik, it was his first album created without collaborating with other musicians. While retaining the energy of live music, Kržišnik incorporated computer-based production techniques—including sampling, virtual instruments, and sequencing—to explore technological aspects of music.

== Context ==
The album's main themes are human violence and war. It represents Kržišnik's protest against the absurdity and evil of war.

The context of the Valse Brutal is based on the life story of a journalist who spent most of his career reporting from war hotspots. During his long career, he learned through his daily experience how difficult it was for people to break free from the vicious cycle of violence and were forced to accept brutality as something normal and death as part of their everyday life. Eventually, they no longer even want to end violence.

== Critical reception ==
Reviewing individual tracks in Večer, Uroš Smasek analyzed the sonic contrasts in The Intruder, noting "highly diverse dynamics," "sharp rhythmic accents," and "ferocious string textures" – a combination he characterized as "a signature Kržišnik sound." For the closing Polite Predators, he described its structural tension as stretched between "orchestral fatalism and instrumental delicacy."

Describing the album as "a thrilling, unsettling work" permeated by a "sense of cruel fate and tragedy," Radio Student critic Mario Batelić framed Valse Brutal as a challenging reflection of contemporary anxieties. Separately, Siol.net characterized Kržišnik’s broader methodology as a symbiosis between "academic 'seriousness' and alternative otherness."

Andrej Predin of Slovenske novice describes the album's music as characterized by dynamics and highlights its tendency to push towards rhythmic and melodic "looseness, only to be reined in again by balanced rhythms and original harmonies". Similarly, Igor Bašin of Dnevnik observed Borut Kržišnik's ability to "effortlessly navigate avant-garde and popular music, academia and alternative culture, yet conform to neither's norms". In his analysis of Kržišnik's compositional "broad perspective," Bašin highlighted the album's "virtual super-real orchestra" aesthetics, characterizing it as a fusion of DIY and avant-garde approaches, punctuated by a post-punk ethos.

In his review, Jure Potokar of Polet framed Valse Brutal within the concept of the zeitgeist ("spirit of the age") and its perpetual evolution throughout artistic history. He described the album as critiquing a core pattern of this evolution: how successive artistic movements reject prior traditions and elevate themselves as uniquely relevant. Potokar argued this mindset extends beyond art, permeating modern life where, as he put it, "novelty reigns supreme, defined by difference from the past." He highlighted "virtuality" – the digitally mediated experience enabling indirect action and artificial realities – as a characteristic manifestation of this contemporary digital zeitgeist. Kržišnik conveys this vision musically, Potokar wrote, "through ironic orchestral gestures, emphatic rhythms, captivating melodic lines, radical dynamic sweeps, and the subtle precision of orchestration."

== Track listing ==
Valse Brutal track listing
No.	Title	Length
1.	"Intruder"	6:17
2.	"Goldbach's Conjecture"	9:24
3.	"Valse Brutal"	5:02
4.	"Ludi Amphitheatrales"	6:24
5.	"Dreams and Frames"	6:27
6.	"Corridors of Power"	7:03
7.	"Polite Predators"	5:30

== Personnel ==
Musicians:

- Borut Kržišnik - virtual orchestra

Production:

- Composed and produced: Borut Kržišnik
- Artistic adviser: Aleksandra Rekar
- Recorded and mixed at P.N. Studios, Ljubljana, Slovenija, Ljubljana, 2008
- Sound engineer: Bac Kajuh
- Sound engineer assistant: Turob Tušek
- Mastering: Colin Attwell
- Design: TBT design
- Acknowledgements: Zelko Pelicon, Mario Marolt, Aldo Ivančič, Franci Zabukovec, Janez Križaj, Tone Škrjanec, Ron Strouken, Martin Žvelc, Marinka Poštrak, Irena Povše, Rudi Pančur, Peter Kus

Label:

- Claudio Records (div. Claudio Contemporary)

== Reviews ==
- Potokar, Jure (24 September 2009). "Brutalni valček" [Brutal Waltz]. Delo (in Slovenian) (Polet ed.). Ljubljana. Archived from the original on 7 March 2025.
- Bašin, Igor (8 August 2009). "Brez utvar" [No Delusions]. Dnevnik (in Slovenian). Ljubljana. Archived from the original on 27 February 2025.
- Batelić, Mario (November–December 2009). "Borut Kržišnik: Valse Brutal" [Borut Kržišnik: Valse Brutal]. Muska (in Slovenian). Ljubljana: Društvo za raziskovanje popularne glasbe.
- Jesih, Dušan (30 August 2009). "Borut Kržišnik: Valse Brutal" [Borut Kržišnik: Valse Brutal] (in Slovenian). RTV Slovenija.
- Milosavljevic, Marko (31 July 2009). "Borut Kržišnik: Valse Brutal". Delo (in Slovenian) (Vikend magazin ed.). Ljubljana. Archived from the original on 2 August 2024.
- Predin, Andrej (20 July 2009). "Brutalni valček Boruta Kržišnika" [Borut Kržišnik’s Brutal Waltz]. Slovenske novice (in Slovenian). Ljubljana: Delo. Archived from the original on 9 February 2025.
- Smasek, Uroš (29 April 2009). "Vsiljivec, vljudni plenilci… v brutalnem valčku" [Intruder, Polite Predators… in a Brutal Waltz] (PDF). Večer (in Slovenian). Maribor.
- "Borut Kržišnik predstavlja: Valse Brutal" [Borut Kržišnik Presents Valse Brutal] (in Slovenian). SIOL. 11 May 2009.
- Batelić, Mario (8 August 2009). "Borut Kržišnik: Valse Brutal". Radio Študent. Tolpa bumov (in Slovenian). Ljubljana. Archived from the original on 7 May 2025.

== Interviews ==
- Krivokapič, Igor (19 October 2009). "Borut Kržišnik". Iz slovenske glasbene ustvarjalnosti (in Slovenian). Event occurs at 17.00 - 18.00. RTV Slovenija. Radio Slovenija, 3. Program, Program ARS.
- Fele, Jolanda (6 May 2009). "Borut Kržišnik in novi avtorski projekt Valse Brutal" [Borut Kržišnik and His New Project Valse Brutal]. Na piedestal (in Slovenian). Event occurs at 22:30. RTV Slovenija. Radio Slovenija, 2. Program, Val 202.
