= Currents of Time =

1991 studio album by Borut Kržišnik

Studio album by Borut Kržišnik
- Released: September 1991; 1st rerelease: 1998; 2nd rerelease: August 2014
- Recorded: 1990–1991
- Studio: P. N. studios, Ljubljana
- Genre: Avant-garde; contemporary; eclecticism
- Length: 46:55
- Label: Rer Megacorp; Tone Casualties; Claudio Records
- Producer: Borut Krzisnik

Borut Kržišnik chronology
Currents of Time (00000001)	La Dolce Vita ((1995))

Currents of Time is the debut album by Slovenian composer Borut Kržišnik. Originally released by ReR Megacorp (London, 1991), two rereleases followed: first by Tone Casualties (Hollywood, 1998) and then by Claudio Records, division Claudio Contemporary (Peacehaven, 2012). The album established Kržišnik's signature style, defined by critic Miha Zadnikar as a "polyglot musical language" - a term later adopted to frame Kržišnik's broader oeuvre.

== Context ==
It features six musicians from diverse backgrounds united in musical exploration, employing varied instrumentation (acoustic, electric, and electronic) and techniques—from scored composition and free improvisation to electronic processing, musique concrète, tape manipulation, and circuit bending. Surpassing conventional categorization, they frame contrasts as parallel musical perspectives.

During the album's production, Kržišnik employed spontaneous composition—his primary method in the 1980s–90s—using a portable multitrack recorder and limited computer processing. This approach allowed on-the-fly recordings in diverse locations, capturing the immediacy of creative moments. The technique mirrors the album's broader ethos of music production.

Kržišnik emphasized the role of spontaneity in his creative process. When asked whether he conceived compositions in advance, he replied: "Never! If that were the case, making music would be pure formality, just administrative note-writing." For him, the essence lay in "the process of music coming into being, when all paths are still open"—a method embracing uncertainty and the unknown while allowing measured control.

== Critical reception ==
Currents of Time received attention for its conceptual approach and eclectic synthesis. The Wire highlighted its diversity, while Delo emphasized its "conceptual layeredness", noting how Kržišnik "moved with sovereign ease" between musical idioms. MusicWeb International deemed it a "genre-bending" work that defied clear categorization.

Later critics contextualized the album within Kržišnik's broader output. Luka Zagoričnik of Delo described it as "primal and direct", yet noted it already featured the "longer compositions that would characterize his later work". Kržišnik acknowledged this observation, explaining that extended formats allowed him to develop musical elements, "their metamorphoses", and "merge ideas into a more complex whole."

Helena Šenica of Stop called it 'a cross-section of our era,' framing its instrumentation—from "wooden sticks" and concrete sounds, through "classical instruments" to "rhythm machines, samplers and […] computers"—as emblematic of "the diversity we witness today."

Miha Zadnikar of Delo identified the 'interaction between man and machine' as the conceptual core of Kržišnik's work—a dynamics between human spontaneity and mechanical rigidity, epitomized by live performance clashing with unyielding electronic systems.

== Track listing ==
No.	Title	Length
1.	"101 Merry Metronomes"	2:36
2.	"The Play of the Puppet"	6:12
3.	"The Bird No. 3"	1:28
4.	"Hey"	2:39
5.	"Break to Build (Build to Break)"	6:41
6.	"Going Down"	3:50
7.	"La Dolce Vita"	2:25
8.	"Huns' Party"	3:59
9.	"It Comes to the Same Thing"	2:49
10.	"The Bird No. 1"	2:51
11.	"Discipline"	5:16
12.	"The Bird No. 2"	0:40
13.	"Johnny in the Funeral Procession"	2:50
14.	"Dance for Dimije and Bare Feet"	2:41

== Personnel ==
Musicians

- Borut Kržišnik: guitar, piano, sampler, rhythm machine, tape, noise
- Mario Marolt: saxophone (#3, #5, #10, #12)
- Nino De Gleria: double bass (#4)
- Hugo Šekoranja: piano (#11)
- Mire Lovrič: vocal (#14)
- Anton Kovač: double bass (#13), rhythm machine (#15)

Production

- Composed and produced: Borut Kržišnik
- Recorded at P.N. Studios, July - August 1990, Ljubljana, Slovenia
- Recording engineer: Bac Kajuh
- Mastering: Colin Attwell
- Front cover artwork (mixed technique): Tomaz Kržišnik
- Front cover photo: Bojan Selaj
- Design: TBT design

The album was originally released by ReR Megacorp and its edition Points East in 1991

Label

- Claudio Records (division Claudio Contemporary)

== Reviews ==
- Cowley, Julian (December 1998). "Borut Krzisnik: Currents of Time". The Wire. No. 178. London. p. 63.
- Clements, Dominy (July 2014). "Borut Krzisnik (b. 1961) Currents of Time". MusicWeb International.
- Pistotnik, Zoran (11 January 1992). "Tokovi časa skozi drobce časa" [Currents of Time through the Fragments of Time]. Delo (in Slovenian). Ljubljana. Archived from the original on 12 April 2016.
- Pistotnik, Zoran (14 December 1991). "Paralelni zvočni svetovi" [Parallel Sound Worlds]. Dnevnik (in Slovenian). Ljubljana.

== Interviews ==
- Zadnikar, Miha (30 May 1998). "Zeitgeisti zbledijo, ostane le dobro" [Zeitgeists Fade, Only the Good Remains]. Delo (in Slovenian) (Saturday Supplement ed.). Ljubljana. p. 41. Archived from the original on 21 March 2019.
- Zagoričnik, Luka (6 May 2008). "Skladanje kot raziskovanje" [Composition as Research]. Delo (in Slovenian). Ljubljana. p. 14. Archived from the original on 26 August 2020.
- Muršič, Rajko (November 1991). "Borut Kržišnik: Currents of Time" [Borut Kržišnik: Currents of Time]. Katedra (in Slovenian). Vol. 32, no. 2. Maribor: University of Maribor.
- Šenica, Hana (23 November 1991). "Paralelni zvočni zidovi" [Parallel Sound Walls]. Stop (in Slovenian). Ljubljana.
- Gabrian, Pina (20 March 2021). "Borut Kržišnik: Živost glasbe oblikujemo prav z odstopanjem od popolne točnosti in uniformnosti" [Borut Kržišnik: We Shape the Liveliness of Music by Deviating from Perfect Accuracy and Uniformity]. MMC RTV SLO (in Slovenian). RTV Slovenija.

== Other Sources ==
- Trdan, Primož (2019). Slovenska elektroakustična glasba in zvočna umetnost [Slovenian Electro-acoustic Music and Sound Art]. www.uni-lj.si (PhD thesis) (in Slovenian). University of Ljubljana. p. 149.
- "In Memory of John Peel Show Nov 7th". inmemoryofjohnpeel.com. 7 November 2019.
- Freedman, Ken (27 September 2000). "Synthetic Options". WFMU’s Wednesday Morning Timeslot. Event occurs at 09:00 – 12:00. WFMU.
