= Dancing Machine (Borut Kržišnik album) =

Dancing Machine

Studio album by Borut Kržišnik
- Released: October 2020
- Recorded: 2020
- Studio: P. N. studios, Ljubljana
- Genre: contemporary; avant-garde; eclecticism
- Length: 52:10
- Label: Claudio Records (div. Claudio Contemporary)
- Producer: Borut Kržišnik

Borut Kržišnik chronology
Lightning (2013)	Dancing Machine (2020)	Utopia (2024)

Dancing Machine is the eighth studio album by Slovenian composer Borut Kržišnik. A contemporary classical-electronic work, it was composed and produced at his P.N. studio in 2018-2019. The album was released in 2020 by the British label Claudio Records, under its sub-label Claudio Contemporary.

== Context ==
The album's main theme is the new big era in human history – the information age. Artificial intelligence is, as Kržišnik put it, "an extension of our own intellect", which not only enables astonishing achievements and development in every aspect of our lives, but also brings about challenges that have never existed before, and "puts mankind in front of the imperative to redefine the notion of what it means to be human." The introductory text from the album's presentation at Cirkulacija 2 in 2020 posits that the primary obstacle to creating a constructive and reliable AI is the challenge of defining and instilling human ethics and values. It argues that human moral norms are not based on formal logic but are instead relativistic and arbitrary. Furthermore, humanity's inability to reach a consensus on a unified ethical framework—whether universal or multi-cultural—makes it impossible to clearly program one into an AI. This problem is compounded by the paradox that humanity cannot serve as a positive example for the ethics it wishes to teach; human history, marked by violence, injustice, and suffering, is itself a contradictory and morally compromised exemplar. In this way, the challenge of teaching ethics to AI holds a mirror to humanity, forcing it to confront its own contradictions. This philosophical problem is further illustrated by core human concepts—such as meaning, justice, empathy, faith, freedom, and love—which the text describes as inherently indefinable. These values, which form the semantic framework of human existence, are seen as inexpressible through precise, logical terms, thus presenting a fundamental challenge for AI.

== Critical response ==
Critical reviews of the album highlighted its fusion of electronic and acoustic elements, its technical innovation, and its implied philosophical meanings.

Branimir Lokner of Time Machine Music described the work as "a complex contemporary work" that confronts "not only ideological but also numerous musical/conceptual challenges." He highlighted the combination of "elements of modern electronics, contemporary classical music, neo-classical strides, and noise variations" all existing in a state of "constant performative/arrangement conflict, dialogue, and struggle." Lokner interpreted this as the author's "unique homage to humanity’s confrontation with industrial and anti-human challenges."

Aleš Rojc of Odzven found that "the very tension between the human and the artificial [...] is a visceral element of his work." He argued that the use of a "virtual symphonic orchestra" provided the composer not only with greater control but also "a noticeable expansion of the sonic possibilities," leading to a work that "transcends merely the composer's world."

This central theme was explored by other critics who examined its execution and impact. Henry Schneider of Expose noted the album's aim to integrate live musicians and software-processed music and "bridge the gap between live and programmed music, creating a symbiosis between man and machine." This was echoed by Bojan Tomažič in an interview for Večer, who found it intriguing that "a new whole emerges from all the components," and pointed to the technology's "capability, which allows us to use techniques that are not achievable with live playing."

Vesna Teržan, writing for Mladina, stated that "Kržišnik's music is powerfully dramatic yet also contemplative." She observed that the composer "moves freely between extremes – tonality or atonality, written score or improvisation" but always draws "a common thread through the contrasts." For Teržan, the final result–arising from these contrasts–is "a complex mental space, filled with philosophical and visual associations."

== Track listing ==
No.	Title	Length
1.	"Thought Collider"	5:41
2.	"Dancing Machine"	5:15
3.	"Hypnotized Society"	5:51
4.	"Rage"	5:57
5.	"Algorithm of Faith"	5:00
6.	"Real Illusions"	6:33
7.	"Who Can Tell?"	4:49
8.	"Capricious Electrons"	5:39
9.	"Ignorant Bytes"	7:25

== Personnel ==
Musicians:

- Borut Kržišnik – virtual orchestra

Production:

- Composed and produced: Borut Kržišnik
- Artistic adviser: Aleksandra Rekar
- Recording engineer: Bac Kajuh
- Recorded and mixed at P.N. Studios, Ljubljana, Slovenia, September 2019
- Mastering: Colin Attwell
- Artwork: TBT design
- Robot image: Almacan

Label:

- Claudio Records (division Claudio Contemporary)

== Critical reception ==
- Menkovski, Julija (14 October 2020). "Borut Kržišnik z novim albumom Dancing Machine" [Borut Kržišnik with His New Album Dancing Machine]. Kultura (in Slovenian). RTV Slovenija.
- Rojc, Aleš (29 October 2020). "Plešoči stroj Boruta Kržišnika" [Borut Kržišnik's Dancing Machine]. www.sigic.si/odzven.html (in Slovenian). Sigic.
- Kopač, Jan (17 January 2021). "Borut Kržišnik: Dancing Machine". Tolpa bumov (in Slovenian). Event occurs at 19:00 - 20:00. Radio Študent.
- Lokner, Branimir (18 January 2020). "Borut Kržišnik: "Dancing Machine"". www.timemachinemusic.org/ (in Serbian).

== Interviews ==
- Mager, Ingrid (28 September 2020). "Kaj je za računalnik sočutje" [What Does Empathy Mean to a Computer]. Dnevnik (in Slovenian). Ljubljana.
- Gabrian, Pina (20 March 2021). "Borut Kržišnik: Živost glasbe oblikujemo prav z odstopanjem od popolne točnosti in uniformnosti" [Borut Kržišnik: We Shape the Liveliness of Music by Deviating From Perfect Accuracy and Uniformity]. MMC RTV SLO (in Slovenian). RTV Slovenija.
- Trdan, Primož (13 November 2020). "Borut Kržišnik" [Borut Kržišnik]. Izpod peresa slovenskih skladateljev (in Slovenian). Event occurs at 13:05. Radio Slovenija. 3. program, Program ARS.
- Tomažič, Bojan (31 January 2021). "V računalnikih ni duše, je pa ogromno znanja" [There Is No Soul in Computers, but There Is a Lot of Knowledge]. Večer (in Slovenian). Maribor. Archived from the original on 23 May 2024.

== Other sources ==
- Teržan, Vesna (6 November 2020). "Objem nasprotij" [The Embrace of Opposites]. Mladina (in Slovenian). Ljubljana.
- Trdan, Primož (16 August 2023). "Oscilacije V" [Oscilations V]. Arsov art atelje (in Slovenian). Event occurs at 20:00 – 22:00. RTV Slovenija. Radio Slovenija, 3. Program, Program ARS.
- "Borut Kržišnik Dancing Machine New Album". www.cirkulacija2.org (in Slovenian). Cirkulacija 2. 29 October 2020.
- Trdan, Primož (2019). "Slovenska elektroakustična glasba in zvočna umetnost" [Slovenian Electro-acoustic Music and Sound Art (PhD thesis)]. www.uni-lj.si (in Slovenian). University of Ljubljana.
