= Tulse Luper =

Fictional character

Tulse Luper is a fictional character, created by film director Peter Greenaway.

"Born in Newport (Greenaway's own birthplace) in 1911, Luper was, according to Greenaway's introduction to the exhibition catalogue, in Moab, Utah in 1928 when "Uranium was 'discovered' there. He was in Antwerp in 1939 when the Germans invaded Belgium. He was in Rome when the Americans arrived in 1944. He met Raoul Wallenberg in Budapest in 1945 and followed him to Moscow in the 1950s. He was at an East-West German checkpoint in 1963" ( Luper at Compton Verney ). The 92 suitcases thus tell Luper's story from 1928 to the fall of the Berlin Wall in 1989, sketching not so much the biography of one man as the story of a century related through some of its key events."

== Character overview ==
Tulse Luper is mentioned in Greenaway's early films A Walk Through H: The Reincarnation of an Ornithologist, Vertical Features Remake, The Falls and The Draughtsman's Contract, and appears as the major character in The Tulse Luper Suitcases. In this film, it is suggested that he is a fiction created by Martino Knockavelli, a childhood friend who feels responsible for his death in an accident. His imagined life story was also told in a series of films and multimedia exhibitions called The Tulse Luper Suitcases.

== Character analysis ==
In an interview given with salon.com, Peter Greenaway stated "Tulse Luper is a sort of alter ego created many years ago -- Tulse could be said to rhyme with the pulse in your wrist, and Luper is a corruption of the Latin for wolf. So how about "danger lurking at the very door of your life?"

It has also been mentioned by Greenaway that the construction of Tulse Luper was based on "a cache of old photographs in a trunk" of a gentleman at a car boot sale whose weathered countenance resembled Samuel Beckett. Beckett's literary influence has been reflected in Greenaway's work.
