= Vertical Features Remake =

- Directed by: Peter Greenaway
- Music by: Michael Nyman, Brian Eno ("IRR title-music")
- Release date: 1978
- Country: United Kingdom
- Language: English

Vertical Features Remake (1978) is a film by Peter Greenaway. It portrays the work of a fictional Institute of Reclamation and Restoration as they attempt to assemble raw footage taken by ornithologist Tulse Luper into a short film, in accordance with his notes and structuralist film theory. The footage consists mostly of vertical landscape features, such as trees and posts, shot in the English landscape. It contains four restoration attempts, each with a documentary-like introduction.

== Plot ==
The concept is presented in mockumentary format. The institute has done their best to understand Luper's project and reconstruct his work according to his specifications. Rediscovered film and notes were used for the project. Then VFR1 plays, with a narrator counting from 1 to 11 in steadily-slower increments. This follows the specifications the Institute believes Luper specified. With each new number, a new film shot is shown. There is no apparent relationship between shots.

The narrator reveals the academic criticism of VFR1. New material was discovered, and some suggest that Luper's project was less formal than VFR1. VFR2 plays. The shots are arranged more thematically, such as fence posts being shown with other fence posts. Extremely sparse piano accompaniment.

New criticism of VF2 is explained. Some doubt whether Luper exists or if he was invented by the institute to embark on an experimental film project. Some say that the more modern / non-landscape footage was inserted contrary to what Luper envisioned; this footage is alleged to have been shot by another. The academics assert that if Luper was building to anything, it would be at the middle of the square described before VFR1, rather than the final shot of VFR. VFR3 plays. Shots change in a call-and-response pattern to a basic piano score.

VFR3 is criticised. Critics note that Luper was perhaps cautioning against a societal reshaping project ("Session Three Programme"), or documenting the landscape as it existed before this apparently massive project. This project is implied to be well known in this film, but little information is given. VFR4 plays. The shots move more rhythmically alongside a livelier piano score.
