= The Tulse Luper Suitcases =

2003 film by Peter Greenaway

The Tulse Luper Suitcases is a multimedia project by film maker and artist Peter Greenaway, initially intended to comprise four films, a 16-episode TV series, and 92 DVDs, as well as websites, CD-ROMs and books. The project documented the imagined life of a fictional character called Tulse Luper.

In the online component of the project, web designers competed to make a game based on the interactive site, The Tulse Luper Journey. The winner took a trip following Tulse Luper's travels: subsequent to this, a final feature film was released.

== Films / DVDs ==
Three films, The Tulse Luper Suitcases, Part 1: The Moab Story, The Tulse Luper Suitcases, Part 2: Vaux to the Sea, and The Tulse Luper Suitcases, Part 3: From Sark to the Finish were released. They were shown out of sequence, with Part 1 released in 2003, Part 3 in early 2004 and Part 2 in summer 2004. Part 1 was entered into the 2003 Cannes Film Festival.

All three were initially released only on Region 2 UK DVDs, allegedly to provide back-story material for designers working on the website's 'suitcases'. These were chosen from submissions in a contest held in 2004. The trilogy was released as a box set in Australia in 2008. There are also two books, Tulse Luper in Turin and Tulse Luper in Venice, published in 2004, for the same purpose.

In 2005, after the winner of the online game finished a free trip following the travels of Luper, an additional final feature, A Life in Suitcases (subtitled The Tulse Luper Journey) was released.

=== Cast ===
- JJ Feild as Tulse Luper / Floris Creps
- Raymond J. Barry as Stephan Figura
- Michèle Bernier as Sophie van Osterhaus
- Valentina Cervi as Cissie Colpitts
- Caroline Dhavernas as Passion Hockmeister
- Anna Galiena as Madame Plens
- Deborah Harry as Fastidieux
- Steven Mackintosh as Günther Zeloty
- Jordi Mollà as Jan Palmerion
- Ornella Muti as Mathilde Figura
- Isabella Rossellini as Madame Moitessier
- Ronald Pickup as Monsieur Moitessier
- Franka Potente as Trixie Boudain
- Francesco Salvi as Paul / Pierre
- Nigel Terry as Sesame Esau
- Ana Torrent as Ana Torrent
- Kevin Tighe as William Gottschalk
- Scot Williams as Percy Hockmeister
- Yorick van Wageningen as Julian Lephrenic
- Jack Wouterse as Erik van Hoyten
- Tom Bower as Sheriff Fender
- Michael Culkin as Luper Authority
- Joanna David as May Jacoby
- Francesca Ventura as a lover
- Benjamin Davies as Hercule
- Keram Malicki-Sánchez as Virgil de Selincourt
- Tanya Moodie as Guam Ravillion
- Vincent Grass as Mrs. Moitessier's Father
- Barbara Tarbuck as Mrs. Fender
- Renata Litvinova as Constance Bulitsky
- Irina Brazgovka as Katerina

== Structure ==
The project has been described by Greenaway as 'a personal history of uranium' and the 'autobiography of a professional prisoner'. It is structured around 92 suitcases allegedly belonging to Luper, 92 being the atomic number of uranium. The number was also used by Greenaway in the formal structure of his earlier work (most notably The Falls). Each suitcase contains an object 'to represent the world'. Collectively they advance or contribute to the biography of the fictional character Tulse Luper, although in many cases the contents are more metaphorical than real.

== The world according to Tulse Luper ==
Tulse Luper, a fictional character, is said to have been born in 1911 in Newport, South Wales and disappeared into ever more obscure prisons and jails in Russia and the Far East in the 1970s. He would have been 100 in 2011. The project alleges that this extraordinary man archived his entire life in 92 suitcases. His imagined life is shrouded in mystery, but it seems that Luper has been present at some of the key historical events of the 20th century, including the first nuclear tests in New Mexico, the 1968 Paris student protests and the fall of the Berlin Wall in 1989. Although Luper is said to have spent much of his life as a 'professional prisoner', he has collected a large number of objects and stored them in suitcases. In a way, these suitcases represent the world according to Tulse Luper. Luper is still presumed to be alive somewhere in the world – probably in a prison somewhere.

== Style ==
The visual style of the three feature films is unorthodox, even compared to other Greenaway films. They are presented as source material and 'background story' for the suitcases which were shown online and in physical exhibitions, and hence are perhaps intended as an audio/video pastiche.

In many scenes multiple takes, different angles, or identical copies of the same footage are displayed simultaneously within the frame, either superimposed or in discrete boxes. Multiple images are typically offset in time from one another, with a corresponding delay in audio. At times, a written representation of the script also scrolls across the screen as it is performed. The overall effect is similar to that of Greenaway's film The Pillow Book, but here the effects are largely devoted to narrator-type characters, or to primary characters commenting on or responding to the action.

The character Tulse Luper has been featured (though rarely seen) in several of Peter Greenaway's earlier film works. In The Tulse Luper Suitcases a substantial portion of Greenaway's output is presented as if filmed by Luper. Other connections to previous Greenaway films include the character Cissie Colpitts, who also appeared in the 1988 feature Drowning By Numbers and the 1978 short Vertical Features Remake as well as in The Falls from the same year. Tulse Luper, like Greenaway himself, is presented as a keeper of extensive lists and catalogues, which serve as a sort of prism through which everything is seen. The most notable instance of this in the project is a collection of 1,001 stories which parallel The Book of One Thousand and One Nights in Arabic literature. The character Martino Knockavelli makes his first appearance here as a plump Italian schoolboy.

== Analysis ==
An entire issue of the online journal Image and Narrative: The Online Magazine of the Visual Narrative, Issue #12 is dedicated to study, analyze, deconstruct, and explain Greenaway's project.

== Tulse Luper Suitcases Exhibition ==
Between 2004 and 2011, a physical exhibition attached to the project was shown at galleries in Ghent (Belgium), Compton Verney, Warwickshire (United Kingdom), Fort Asperen (Netherlands) and São Paulo (Brazil). The exhibition explored the connections between objects, events and ideas. As a writer, collector, cataloguer and professional list-maker, the character Luper is shown to be fascinated by traces, systems, maps, numbers and artifacts. At the heart of the exhibition is the collection of 92 suitcases that Luper supposedly abandoned on his travels. It also included live performers, film and audio installations.

The exhibition explored the interests and life of the elusive Luper, giving partial clues to his existence, his obsessions, the people he met and the places he visited. A multimedia encyclopedia emerged, through objects and audiovisual representations of life in the atomic age. Each exhibition site-specific, offering the audience, through modern technology, a unique look at Luper's perceptions during his travels.

The project was structured as an open work, with contributions from fan websites and other sources. In 2007 in São Paulo, at the Videobrasil Festival, an artist (Thaís de Almeida Prado) created a performance, especially for the Tulse Luper Suitcases exhibition. The project called "The Sleeper who ..." (A Adormecida que ...]) generated new components such as a diary, a blog, videos, and photographs of the performer, as well as interaction with the public through letters.
