= Spontaneous composition =

Spontaneous composition is music performed, occurring, or resulting from a sudden natural impulse, tendency, or inclination; without effort or premeditation; natural and unconstrained; unplanned.

Spontaneity in music is mostly associated with improvised music and jazz, but through the course of the last century it became practiced in other genres as well.

Improvisation is one possible compositional tool used in creating a spontaneous composition.

Keith Jarrett, an American pianist, is known for his work, which is almost exclusively based on improvisation. Keith Jarrett considers spontaneity to be an essential element of his music. He never writes musical notations for his works and makes no plans before a performance. Jarrett describes his compositional process as “being three people at once while improvising: the Improviser, the Spontaneous Composer, and the Keyboardist (the man at the keyboard). Jarrett himself is performing all of the tasks he describes simultaneously, but in an attempt to explain improvisation as an activity, he breaks down the task of performing into separate but interdependent “jobs” completed by his personae. (…) Jarrett describes the perfect work of his personae as the height of improvisational experience; when each of his personae are able to work freely and in harmony with the others (…).”

Jarrett further explains: "If I remain the listener and not think I'm the player, if I remain the listener and not control the thing, something happens."

The term "spontaneous composition" is closely associated with the music of Art Ensemble of Chicago. The band is best known for their innovative combining of absolute free playing with composed parts, building their compositions on improvisation, augmented communication between the players and prearranged sequences. Their music is often associated with avant-garde jazz, but they played freely through various musical zones, from the most reverent, like traditional, gospel, or so-called “Great Black Music”, to the most radical, like free-jazz or experimental. However, they never confined themselves to a single musical style or strict rules. They simply called it “creative music”.

Unlike Keith Jarrett's compositions, which were created entirely spontaneously, the music of Art Ensemble of Chicago was built through various combinations in the range between free and prearranged music. Its member, Roscoe Mitchell, multi-instrumentalist and inventor of new percussions, describes their way of composing as follows: ”I’m interested in all aspects of creativity. And one goal has always been to be a really good improviser who really does create spontaneous composition. So I study all the time, trying to develop ways to improve communication amongst the players and to shape and control the improvisations. There are so many paths to investigate, and not just contemporary paths.”

Scott Barry Kaufman, a psychologist known for his work on creativity, human potential and intelligence, explores concepts related to spontaneity in creative processes. He postulates that spontaneity is essential for creative process and he analyzed it by exploring processes like improvisation, brainstorming, openness, or playfulness.
