= Peter Greenaway =

British filmmaker and artist (born 1942)

Peter Greenaway CBE
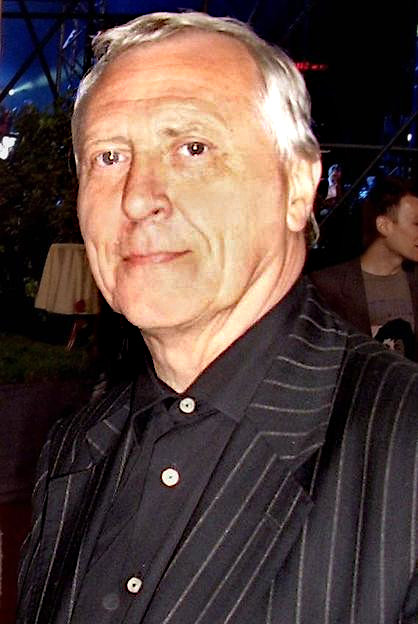
- Greenaway in 2007
- Born: 5 April 1942 (age 84); Newport, Wales
- Education: Walthamstow College of Art
- Occupations: Film director, screenwriter, film editor, cinematographer, visual artist
- Years active: 1962–present
- Notable work: The Draughtsman's Contract (1982); The Cook, The Thief, His Wife & Her Lover (1989)

Peter Greenaway CBE (born 5 April 1942) is a British filmmaker and visual artist. He is known for making stylized films distinctly influenced of Renaissance and Baroque painting, and Mannerist painting in particular.

His notable feature films include The Draughtsman's Contract (1982), A Zed & Two Noughts (1985), The Belly of an Architect (1987), Drowning by Numbers (1988), The Cook, the Thief, His Wife & Her Lover (1989), Prospero's Books (1991), and Nightwatching (2007). Greenaway has also created works in other mediums, notably the multimedia Tulse Luper Suitcases, documentaries, and several video installations. In 2014, he received the BAFTA Outstanding British Contribution to Cinema Award.

Common traits in his films are the scenic composition and illumination and the contrasts of costume and nudity, nature and architecture, furniture and people, sexual pleasure and painful death. The BFI's Screenonline website describes him as "a philosopher of cinema," and "an artist who is a believer in the subversive power of the image."

== Early life ==
Greenaway was born in Newport, Wales, to a teacher mother and a builder's merchant father. Greenaway's family had relocated to Wales prior to his birth to escape the Blitz. They returned to the London area at the end of World War II and settled in Woodford, then part of Essex. He attended Churchfields Junior School and later Forest School in nearby Walthamstow.

At an early age Greenaway decided on becoming a painter. He became interested in European cinema, focusing first on the films of Ingmar Bergman, and then on the French Nouvelle Vague filmmakers such as Jean-Luc Godard and, most especially, Alain Resnais. Greenaway has said that Resnais's Last Year in Marienbad (1961) had been the most important influence upon his own filmmaking (and he himself established a close working relationship with that film's cinematographer Sacha Vierny).

== Career ==
=== 1962–1999 ===
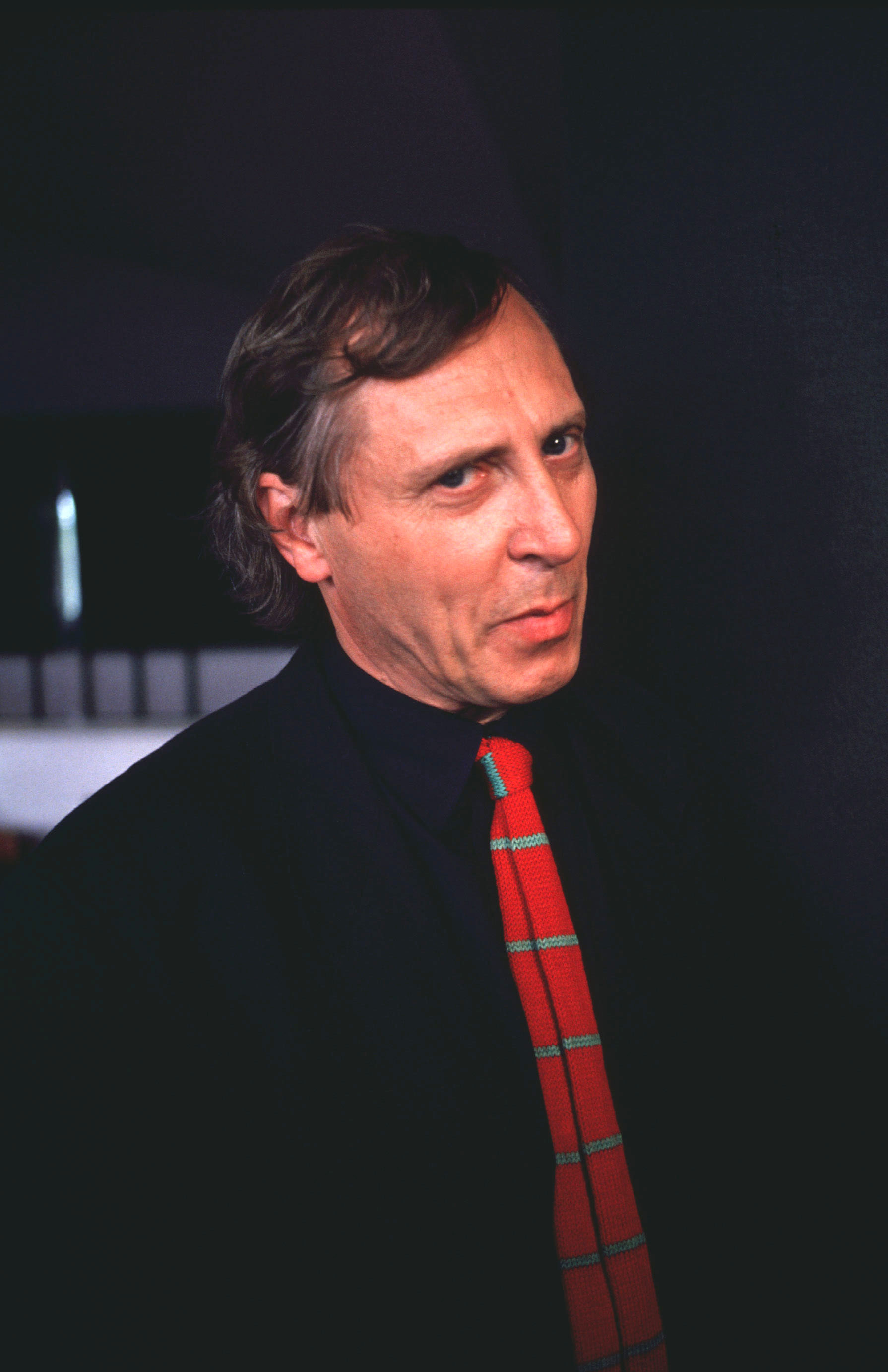
Greenaway at the 44th Venice Film Festival (1987)

In 1962, Greenaway began studies at Walthamstow College of Art, where a fellow student was musician Ian Dury (later cast in The Cook, the Thief, His Wife & Her Lover). Greenaway trained as a muralist for three years; he made his first film, Death of Sentiment, a churchyard furniture essay filmed in four large London cemeteries. In 1965, he joined the Central Office of Information (COI), where he went on to work for fifteen years as a film editor and director. In that time he made a series of experimental films, starting with Train (1966), footage of the last steam trains at Waterloo station (situated behind the COI), edited to a musique concrète composition. Tree (1966) is a homage to the embattled tree growing in concrete outside the Royal Festival Hall on the South Bank in London. In the late 1970s, he made Vertical Features Remake and A Walk Through H. The former is an examination of various arithmetical editing structures, and the latter is a journey through the maps of a fictitious country.

In 1980, Greenaway delivered The Falls (his first feature-length film) – a mammoth, fantastical, absurdist encyclopaedia of flight-associated material all relating to ninety-two victims of what is referred to as the Violent Unknown Event (VUE). In the 1980s his cinema flowered in his best-known films, The Draughtsman's Contract (1982), A Zed & Two Noughts (1985), The Belly of an Architect (1987), Drowning by Numbers (1988), and his most successful film, The Cook, the Thief, His Wife & Her Lover (1989). Greenaway's most familiar musical collaborator during this period is composer Michael Nyman, who has scored several films.

In 1989, Greenaway collaborated with artist Tom Phillips on a television serial A TV Dante, dramatising the first few cantos of Dante's Inferno. In the 1990s he presented Prospero's Books (1991), the controversial The Baby of Mâcon (1993), The Pillow Book (1996), and 8½ Women (1999).

In the early 1990s Greenaway wrote ten opera libretti known as the Death of a Composer series, dealing with the commonalities of the deaths of ten composers from Anton Webern to John Lennon; however, the other composers are fictitious, and one is a character from The Falls. In 1995, Louis Andriessen completed the sixth libretto, Rosa – A Horse Drama. He is currently professor of cinema studies at the European Graduate School in Saas-Fee, Switzerland.

=== 2000–present ===
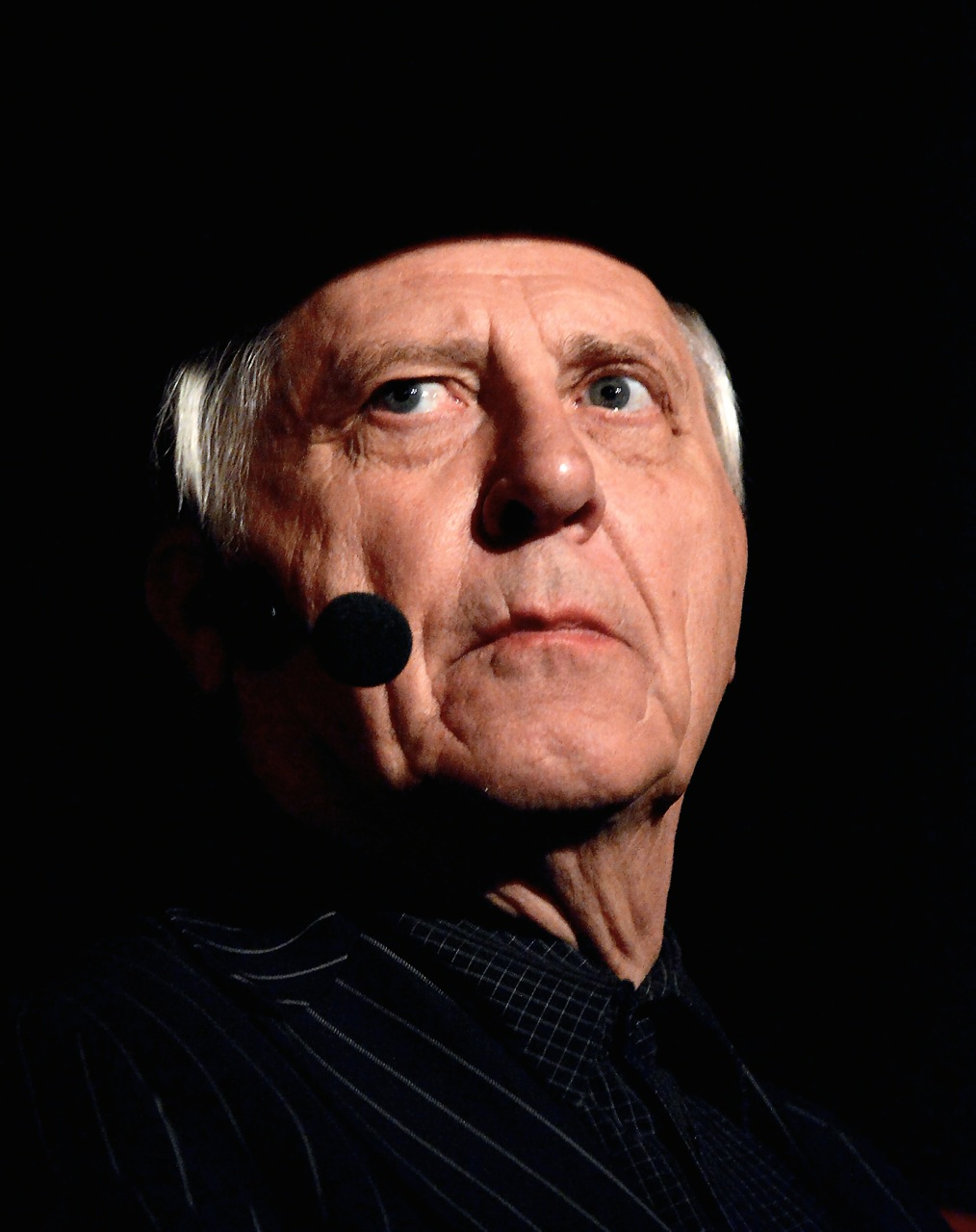
Greenaway in Stockholm in 2013

Greenaway presented the ambitious The Tulse Luper Suitcases, a multimedia project that resulted in three films, a website, two books, a touring exhibition, and a shorter feature which reworked the material of the first three films.

He also contributed to Visions of Europe, a short film collection by different European Union directors; his British entry is The European Showerbath. Nightwatching and Rembrandt's J'Accuse are two films on Rembrandt, released respectively in 2007 and 2008. Nightwatching is the first feature in the series "Dutch Masters", with the second project titled as Goltzius and the Pelican Company.

On 17 June 2005, Greenaway appeared for his first VJ performance during an art club evening in Amsterdam, Netherlands, with music by DJ Serge Dodwell (aka Radar), as a backdrop, 'VJ' Greenaway used for his set a special system consisting of a large plasma screen with laser controlled touchscreen to project the ninety-two Tulse Luper stories on the twelve screens of "Club 11", mixing the images live. This was later reprised at the Optronica festival, London.

On 12 October 2007, he created the multimedia installation Peopling the Palaces at Venaria Reale at the Royal Palace of Venaria, which animated the Palace with 100 videoprojectors.

Greenaway was interviewed for Clive Meyer's Critical Cinema: Beyond the Theory of Practice (2011), and voiced strong criticisms of film theory as distinct from discussions of other media: "Are you sufficiently happy with cinema as a thinking medium if you are only talking to one person?"

On 3 May 2016, he received a Honoris Causa doctorate from the University of San Martín, Argentina.

=== Nine Classical Paintings Revisited ===
In 2006, Greenaway began a series of digital video installations, Nine Classical Paintings Revisited, with his exploration of Rembrandt's Night Watch in the Rijksmuseum in Amsterdam. On 30 June 2008, after much negotiation, Greenaway staged a one-night performance 'remixing' da Vinci's The Last Supper in the refectory of Santa Maria delle Grazie in Milan to a select audience of dignitaries. The performance consisted of superimposing digital imagery and projections onto the painting with music from the composer Marco Robino.

Night Watch by Rembrandt

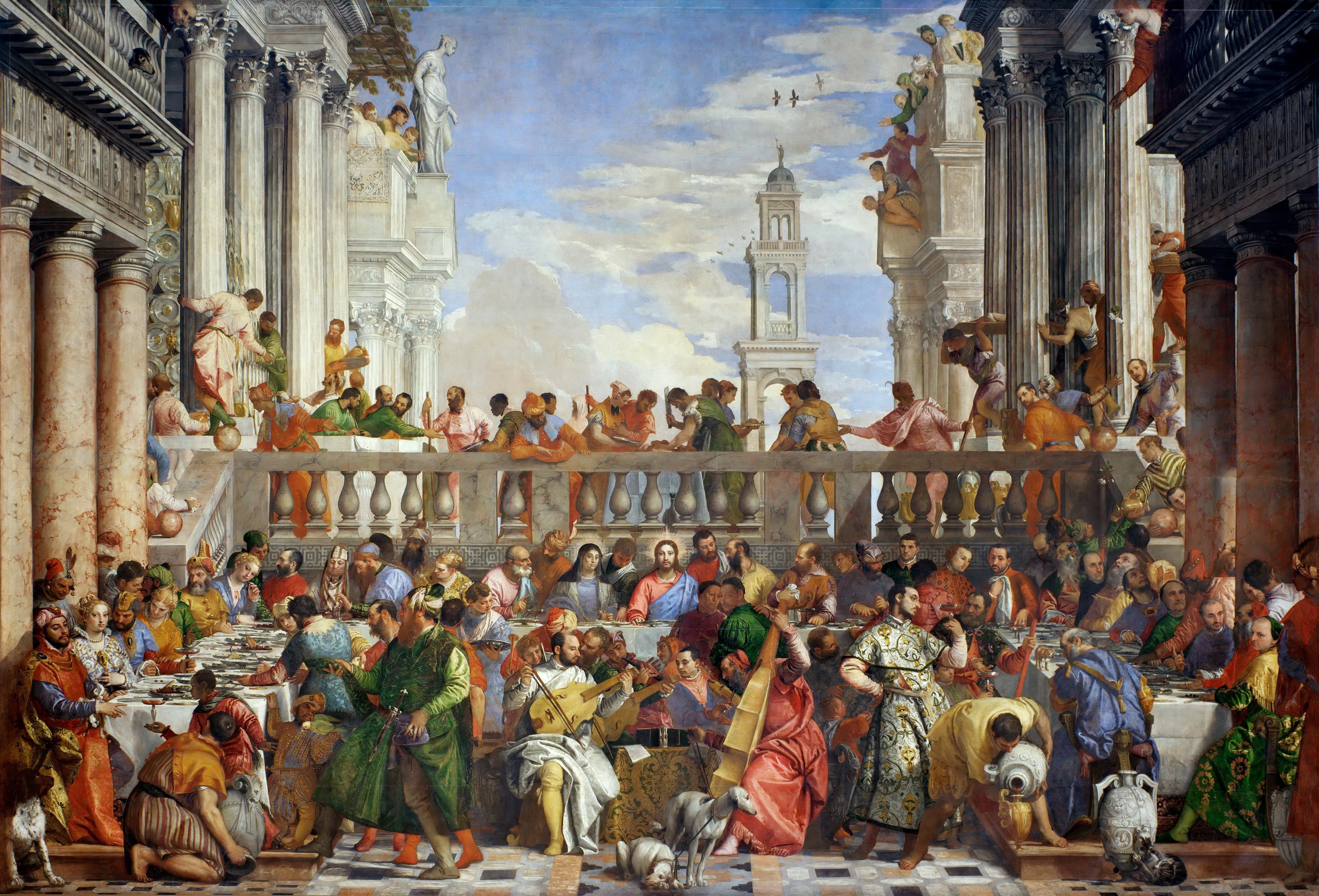
The Wedding at Cana by Paolo Veronese (mid-16th century)

Greenaway exhibited his digital exploration of The Wedding at Cana by Paolo Veronese as part of the 2009 Venice Biennial. An arts writer for The New York Times called it "possibly the best unmanned art history lecture you'll ever experience," while acknowledging that some viewers might respond to it as "mediocre art, Disneyfied kitsch or a flamboyant denigration of site-specific video installation." The 50-minute presentation, set to a soundtrack, incorporates closeup images of faces from the painting along with animated diagrams revealing compositional relations among the figures. These images are projected onto and around the replica of the painting that now stands at the original site, within the Palladian architecture of the Benedictine refectory on San Giorgio Maggiore. The soundtrack features music and imagined dialogue scripted by Greenaway for the 126 "wedding guests, servants, onlookers and wedding crashers" depicted in the painting, consisting of small talk and banal chatter that culminates in reaction to the miraculous transformation of water to wine, according to the Gospels the first miracle performed by Jesus. Picasso's Guernica, Seurat's Grande Jatte, works by Jackson Pollock and Claude Monet, Velázquez's Las Meninas and Michelangelo's The Last Judgment are possible series subjects.

== Personal life ==
In 2001 Peter Greenaway married the Dutch multimedia artist Saskia Boddeke. They live in Amsterdam and have a daughter named Zoë (often referred to as Pip) (born c. 2001), who featured in the documentary The Greenaway Alphabet. He has another child who was born c. 2004.

== Filmography ==
Key
| † | Denotes titles that have not yet been released |

=== Feature films ===
| Year | Title | Notes |
|---|---|---|
| 1980 | The Falls | Also editor |
| 1982 | The Draughtsman's Contract | |
| 1985 | A Zed & Two Noughts | |
| 1987 | The Belly of an Architect | |
| 1988 | Drowning by Numbers | |
| 1989 | The Cook, the Thief, His Wife & Her Lover | |
| 1991 | Prospero's Books | |
| 1993 | The Baby of Mâcon | |
| 1996 | The Pillow Book | Also editor |
| 1999 | 8½ Women | |
| 2003 | The Tulse Luper Suitcases, Part 1: The Moab Story | Premiered as one film as A Life in Suitcases (2005) |
| 2004 | The Tulse Luper Suitcases, Part 2: Vaux to the Sea | Premiered as one film as A Life in Suitcases (2005) |
| 2004 | The Tulse Luper Suitcases, Part 3: From Sark to the Finish | Premiered as one film as A Life in Suitcases (2005) |
| 2007 | Nightwatching | |
| 2012 | Goltzius and the Pelican Company | |
| 2015 | Eisenstein in Guanajuato | |
| TBA | Walking to Paris † | |
| TBA | Tower Stories † | |

=== Short films ===
| Year | Title | Notes |
|---|---|---|
| 1962 | Death of Sentiment | |
| 1966 | Tree | |
| 1966 | Train | |
| 1967 | Revolution | |
| 1967 | 5 Postcards from Capital Cities | |
| 1969 | Intervals | |
| 1971 | Erosion | |
| 1973 | H Is for House | |
| 1975 | Windows | |
| 1975 | Water Wrackets | |
| 1975 | Water | |
| 1976 | Goole by Numbers | |
| 1978 | Dear Phone | |
| 1978 | Vertical Features Remake | |
| 1978 | A Walk Through H: The Reincarnation of an Ornithologist | |
| 1978 | 1–100 | |
| 1984 | Making a Splash | |
| 1985 | Inside Rooms: 26 Bathrooms, London & Oxfordshire | |
| 1989 | Hubert Bals Handshake | |
| 1992 | Rosa: La monnaie de munt | |
| 1995 | Peter Greenaway | Segment of Lumière and Company |
| 1997 | The Bridge Celebration | |
| 2001 | The Man in the Bath | |
| 2004 | European Showerbath | Segment of Visions of Europe |
| 2011 | Castle Amerongen | |
| 2013 | Just in Time | Segment of 3x3D |

=== Documentaries and mockumentaries ===
- Eddie Kid (1978)
- Cut Above the Rest (1978)
- Zandra Rhodes (1979)
- Women Artists (1979)
- Leeds Castle (1979)
- Lacock Village (1980)
- Country Diary (1980)
- Terence Conran (1981)
- Four American Composers (1983)
- The Coastline (also known as The Sea in their Blood) (1983)
- Fear of Drowning (1988)
- The Reitdiep Journeys (2001)
- Rembrandt's J'Accuse (2008)
- The Marriage (2009)
- Atomic Bombs on the Planet Earth (2011)
- Luther and His Legacy (2017)

=== Television ===
- Act of God (1980)
- Death in the Seine (French TV, 1988)
- A TV Dante (mini-series, 1989)
- M Is for Man, Music, Mozart (1991)
- A Walk Through Prospero's Library (1992)
- Darwin (French TV, 1993)
- The Death of a Composer: Rosa, a Horse Drama (1999)

== Exhibitions ==
- The Physical Self, Museum Boymans van Beuningen, Rotterdam (1991)
- Le bruit des nuages (as curator), Louvre Museum, Paris (1992)
- 100 Objects to represent the World (1992) at the Academy of Fine Arts Vienna and the Hofburg Imperial Palace Vienna.
- Stairs 1 Geneva (1995)
- Flyga över vatten/Flying over water, Malmö Konsthall (16/9 2000 – 14/1 2001)
- Peopling the Palaces at Venaria Reale, Palace of Venaria (2007)
- Heavy Water, Chelouche Gallery, Tel Aviv (2011)
- Sex & The Sea, Maritiem Museum, Rotterdam (2013)
- The Towers/Lucca Hubris, Lucca (2013)
- Body parts, Palacio sala de Verónicas, Murcia (2017)
