= Opera North: history and repertoire, seasons 1990–91 to 1996–97 =

Opera North is an opera company based at The Grand Theatre, Leeds, England. This article covers the period when the company's music director was Paul Daniel.

== History ==
The team of Paul Daniel and General Administrator Nicholas Payne brought a number of novelties to the ON repertoire before Payne's departure in 1993 to become Opera Director at the Royal Opera House, Covent Garden. There were British premieres of Roberto Gerhard's The Duenna and Franz Schreker's Der ferne Klang (directed by Brigitte Fassbaender) and the British professional premiere of Carl Nielsen's Maskarade. A number of arias written by Mozart for insertion into other composers' operas, together with some of his concert arias were brought together by Paul Griffiths as an opera entitled as The Jewel Box. Tchaikovsky's one-act Iolanta was reunited with his ballet The Nutcracker (performed by Matthew Bourne's Adventures in Motion Pictures) and first performed by Opera North on the 100th anniversary of their first performances in Saint Petersburg. Paul Dukas's Ariane et Barbe-bleue had its first British performance in over 50 years, and other unusual repertoire included Michael Tippett's King Priam, Chabrier's L'étoile and Rossini's The Thieving Magpie, as well as the world premiere of Robert Saxton's Caritas.

In 1993, Nicholas Payne was succeeded by Ian Ritchie, previously managing director of the Scottish Chamber Orchestra. The 1993–94 season included two more world premieres – Michael Berkeley's Baa-Baa Black Sheep, based on a story by Rudyard Kipling, and Benedict Mason's Playing Away, an opera about football which premiered at the Munich Biennale – as well as three neglected operas: Phyllida Lloyd's production of Benjamin Britten's Gloriana, David McVicar's production of Mozart's early Il re pastore, and Francesca Zambello's production of Puccini's La rondine. Ritchie, whose title had been general director, left the company in 1994 to freelance as an arts management consultant, and his successor was the current general director, Richard Mantle, who had previously worked for English National Opera, Scottish Opera and Edmonton Opera.

Notable among new productions during Paul Daniel's final three seasons as music director were Richard Jones's Pelléas et Mélisande (with Daniel's wife, Joan Rodgers, as Mélisande), Jonathan Miller's Il matrimonio segreto from Glimmerglass Opera, the British premiere of Chabrier's Le roi malgré lui, Verdi's first opera, Oberto (with John Tomlinson directing as well as playing the title character), William Walton's Troilus and Cressida, Luigi Cherubini's Médée in the composer's adaptation for Vienna and Ambroise Thomas's Hamlet, as well as Tannhäuser, Iphigénie en Aulide and Il ritorno d'Ulisse in patria. Following the success of Show Boat, the company staged another Broadway musical, Kurt Weill's Love Life.

Notable conductors appearing with the company during this period included Harry Bicket, Ivor Bolton, Oliver von Dohnányi, Claire Gibault, Roy Goodman, Alan Hacker, Richard Hickox, Diego Masson, Andrew Parrott, David Porcelijn, Carlo Rizzi and Antoni Ros-Marbà. Directors included Tim Albery, Annabel Arden, Tom Cairns, Martin Duncan, Caroline Gawn, Dalia Ibelhauptaitė, Helena Kaut-Howson, Jeremy Sams, Matthew Warchus and Deborah Warner.

Principal singers included sopranos Josephine Barstow, Susan Chilcott, Susannah Glanville, Mary Hegarty, Janis Kelly and Linda Kitchen, mezzo-sopranos Patricia Bardon, Alice Coote and Linda Finnie, tenors Barry Banks, Edmund Barham, Kim Begley, Philip Langridge, Paul Nilon and Christopher Ventris, baritones William Dazeley, Gerald Finley, Robert Hayward, Keith Latham, Anthony Michaels-Moore, Alan Opie and Eric Roberts, basses and bass-baritones Clive Bayley, Andrew Shore and Richard Van Allan,

Paul Daniel marked his departure to become music director of English National Opera with two concert performances of Erich Wolfgang Korngold's Violanta, one in Leeds and the other at The Proms. The soloists were Janice Cairns, Hans Aschenbach, Jonathan Summers, Stuart Kale and Liane Keegan. He left the company in September 1997 and, pending the appointment of a new music director, Elgar Howarth was designated music advisor.

== Repertoire ==
Below is a list of main stage (Note: "Main stage" means operas performed at Leeds Grand Theatre and a number of touring venues; small-scale productions are not included. Semi-staged concert performances at Leeds Town Hall and other similar venues are included, but concert performances without any staging are not.) operas performed by the company during this period.

Season	Opera (Note: Titles in Bold are new productions. Opera titles are those used in Wikipedia and not necessarily those used by Opera North.)	Composer	Principal cast	Conductor	Director	Designer (Note: Where two designers are credited, the first-named designed the set and the second designed the costumes)
1990–91	**Ariane et Barbe-bleue**	Dukas	Anne-Marie Owens (Ariane), Jonathan Best (Bluebeard)	Paul Daniel	Patrick Mason	Joe Vaněk
1990–91	La traviata	Verdi	Eva Jenisová (Violetta), Bonaventura Bottone (Alfredo), Anthony Michaels-Moore/Jason Howard (Germont)	Carlo Rizzi	Revival of 1984–85 production	
1990–91	The Threepenny Opera	Weill	Alan Oke (Macheath), Linda Kitchen (Polly), Kate Flowers (Jenny Diver), Mark Lufton (Peachum), Sandra Francis (Mrs Peachum)	Martin Pickard	Revival of 1983–84 production	
1990–91	Così fan tutte	Mozart	Jane Leslie MacKenzie (Fiordiligi), Beverley Mills (Dorabella), Paul Nilon (Ferrando), Robert Hayward (Guglielmo), Kate Flowers (Despina), Eric Roberts (Don Alfonso)	Alan Hacker	Revival of 1981–82 production	
1990–91	**Attila**	Verdi	John Tomlinson/Jan Galla (Attila), Karen Huffstodt/Josephine Barstow (Odabella), Edmund Barham (Foresto), Jason Howard (Ezio)	Paul Daniel	Ian Judge	John Gunter/ Deirdre Clancy
1990–91	**The Jewel Box** (world premiere)	Mozart (Note: Arranged by Paul Griffiths)	Barry Banks (Pedrolino), Mary Hegarty (Columbina), Pamela Helen Stephen (Composer), Jennifer Rhys-Davies (Singer), Mark Curtis (Dottore), Quentin Hayes (Pantalone), Stephen Richardson (Father)	Elgar Howarth	Francisco Negrin	Anthony Baker
1990–91	Faust	Gounod	Arthur Davies (Faust), Anne Dawson (Marguerite), Richard Van Allan (Méphistophélès), Peter Savidge/Geoffrey Dolton (Valentin)	David Lloyd-Jones/ Roy Laughlin	Revival of 1985–86 production	
1990–91	Carmen	Bizet	Sally Burgess (Carmen), Edmund Barham (Don José), Robert Hayward/Jason Howard (Escamillo), Anne Williams-King (Micaela)	Oliver von Dohnányi	Revival of 1987–88 production	
1990–91	**King Priam**	Tippett	Andrew Shore (Priam), Christopher Ventris (Paris), Patricia Bardon (Helen), Neill Archer (Achilles), Eiddwen Harrhy (Hecuba), Geoffrey Dolton (Hector), Linda McLeod (Andromache)	Paul Daniel	Tom Cairns	Tom Cairns
1990–91	**Don Giovanni**	Mozart	Robert Hayward (Don Giovanni), Helen Field (Donna Anna), Jane Leslie MacKenzie (Donna Elvira), John Hall (Leporello), Paul Nilon (Don Ottavio)	Paul Daniel	Tim Albery	Ashley; Martin-Davis
1991–92	**L’étoile**	Chabrier	Pamela Helen Stephen (Lazuli), Mary Hegarty (Princess Laoula), Anthony Mee (King Ouf), John Hall (Sirocco), Kate Flowers (Aloès), Alan Oke (Hérisson), Mark Curtis (Tapioca)	Jean‑Yves Ossonce /Martin Pickard	Phyllida Lloyd	Anthony Ward
1991–92	La finta giardiniera	Mozart	Lynne Dawson (Sandrina), Paul Nilon (Belfiore), Neil Jenkins (Podestà), Richard Jackson (Nardo), Luretta Bybee/Ann Taylor (Ramiro)	Alan Hacker	Revival of 1989–90 production	
1991–92	Don Giovanni	Mozart	Robert Hayward (Don Giovanni), Helen Field/Bronwen Mills (Donna Anna), Jane Leslie MacKenzie (Donna Elvira), John Hall (Leporello), Paul Nilon (Don Ottavio)	Christopher Gayford	Revival of 1990–91 production	
1991–92	The Jewel Box	Mozart	Barry Banks (Pedrolino), Mary Hegarty (Columbina), Pamela Helen Stephen (Composer), Jennifer Rhys-Davies (Singer), Mark Curtis (Dottore), Quentin Hayes (Pantalone), Mark Glanville (Father)	Roy Laughlin/ Elgar Howarth	Revival of 1990–91 production	
1991–92	**Caritas** (world premiere)	Saxton	Eirian Davies (Christine), Jonathan Best (Bishop Henry), Christopher Ventris (Robert), David Gwynne (Richard)	Diego Masson	Patrick Mason	Joe Vaněk
1991–92	Maskarade	Nielsen	Paul Nilon (Leander), Mary Hegarty (Leonora), Geoffrey Dolton (Henrik), Linda Ormiston (Magdelone), Clive Bayley (Jeronimus)	Roy Laughlin	Revival of 1989–90 production	
1991–92	**Madama Butterfly**	Puccini	Maryanne Telese (Butterfly), Richard Taylor/David Maxwell Anderson (Pinkerton), Keith Latham (Sharpless), Patricia Bardon (Suzuki)	Martin André	Jonathan Alver	Lez Brotherston/ Stephen Rodwell
1991–92	**Der ferne Klang** (British premiere)	Schreker	Virginia Kerr (Grete), Kim Begley (Fritz), William Dazeley (Count), Peter Sidhom (Dr Vigelius)	Paul Daniel	Brigitte; Fassbaender	Ultz
1991–92	**La gazza ladra**	Rossini	Anne Dawson (Ninetta), Barry Banks (Giannetto), Andrew Shore (Podestà), Matthew Best (Fernando), Elizabeth McCormack (Pippo)	Ivor Bolton	Martin Duncan	Sue Blane
1991–92	**Rigoletto**	Verdi	Keith Latham/Michael Lewis (Rigoletto), David Maxwell Anderson (Duke), Juliet Booth (Gilda)	John Pryce-Jones	Patrick Mason	Joe Vaněk
1991–92	Boris Godunov	Mussorgsky	John Tomlinson (Boris), Paul Charles Clarke (Grigory), Jeffrey Lawton (Shuisky), Matthew Best (Pimen)	Paul Daniel	Revival of 1988–89 production	
1992–93	**The Duenna** (British premiere)	Gerhard	Susan Chilcott (Luisa), Pamela Helen Stephen (Clara), Adrian Clarke (Ferdinand), Gordon Wilson (Antonio), Andrew Shore (Jerome), Eric Roberts (Isaac), Gillian Knight (The Duenna)	Antoni Ros-Marbà	Helena; Kaut-Howson	Sue Blane
1992–93	Rigoletto	Verdi	Michael Lewis (Rigoletto), David Maxwell Anderson (Duke), Rosa Mannion (Gilda)	Paul Daniel	Revival of 1991–92 production	
1992–93	**The Marriage of Figaro**	Mozart	Gerald Finley/David Mattinson (Figaro), Linda Kitchen/Mary Plazas (Susanna), Robert Hayward/William Dazeley (Count), Jane Leslie MacKenzie (Countess), Ann Taylor-Morley/Pamela Helen Stephen (Cherubino)	Andrew Parrott	Caroline Gawn	Alison Chitty
1992–93	**Orpheus in the Underworld**	Offenbach	Harry Nicoll (Orpheus), Linda Kitchen/Yvonne Barclay (Euridice), Eric Roberts (Jupiter)	Wyn Davies	Martin Duncan	Tim Hatley
1992–93	**Billy Budd**	Britten	Jason Howard (Billy Budd), Nigel Robson/Philip Langridge (Captain Vere), John Tomlinson (Claggart)	Elgar Howarth	Graham Vick	Chris Dyer
1992–93	**Iolanta** (Note: Performed as a double-bill with Adventures in Motion Pictures' version of The Nutcracker to celebrate the centenary of both works.)	Tchaikovsky	Joan Rodgers (Iolanta), Kim Begley (Vaudémont), Robert Hayward (Robert), Gwynne Howell/Norman Bailey (King René)	David Lloyd-Jones/ Martin Pickard	Martin Duncan	Anthony Ward
1992–93	**Don Carlos**	Verdi	Richard Burke (Carlos), Linda McLeod (Elisabetta), Anthony Michaels-Moore (Posa), John Tomlinson (Philip II), Claire Powell (Eboli)	Paul Daniel/ Roy Laughlin	Tim Albery	Hildegard Bechtler /Nicky Gillibrand
1992–93	**La bohème**	Puccini	William Burden (Rodolfo), Jane Leslie MacKenzie (Mimi), Robert Hayward (Marcello), Juliet Booth (Musetta)	Roy Laughlin/ Paul Daniel	Phyllida Lloyd	Anthony Ward
1992–93	**La Gioconda**	Ponchielli	Rosalind Plowright/Marie Slorach (Gioconda), Edmund Barham (Enzo), Sally Burgess (Laura), Keith Latham (Barnaba)	Oliver von Dohnányi	Philip Prowse	Philip Prowse
1992–93	**Wozzeck**	Berg	Andrew Shore (Wozzeck), Vivian Tierney (Marie), Jeffrey Lawton (Captain), John Rath (Doctor), Alan Woodrow (Drum-Major)	Paul Daniel	Deborah Warner	Hildegard Bechtler /Nicky Gillibrand
1993–94	The Love for Three Oranges	Prokofiev	Christopher Ventris (The Prince), Paul Harrhy (Truffaldino), Andrew Shore (Leander), Maria Moll (Fata Morgana)	Wyn Davies/ Martin Pickard	Revival of 1988–89 production	
1993–94	La bohème	Puccini	Gordon Wilson (Rodolfo), Juliet Booth (Mimi), Robert Hayward (Marcello), Janis Kelly (Musetta)	Bruno Aprea	Revival of 1992–93 production	
1993–94	Tamerlano	Handel	Christopher Robson (Tamburlaine), Philip Langridge (Bajazet), Graham Pushee (Andronicus), Rosa Mannion (Asteria), Patricia Bardon (Irene)	Roy Goodman	Revival of 1984–85 production	
1993–94	**Baa-Baa Black Sheep** (world premiere)	Berkeley	William Dazeley (Mowgli), Fiona Kimm (Auntirosa), Henry Newman (Captain)	Paul Daniel	Jonathan Moore	David Blight
1993–94	**Il re pastore**	Mozart	Joan Rodgers (Amyntas), Mary Hegarty (Elisa), Martyn Hill (Alexander), Patricia Bardon (Tamyris), Philip Salmon (Agenor)	Paul Daniel	David McVicar	Frank Higgins/ David McVicar
1993–94	**Gloriana**	Britten	Josephine Barstow (Elizabeth I), Thomas Randle (Essex), Susan Chilcott (Lady Rich), Karl Daymond (Mountjoy), Yvonne Burnett (Lady Essex), Clive Bayley (Raleigh), Eric Roberts (Cecil)	Paul Daniel	Phyllida Lloyd	Anthony Ward
1993–94	La traviata	Verdi	Michal Shamir (Violetta), David Maxwell Anderson (Alfredo), Peter Sodhom (Germont)	Jean‑Yves Ossonce /Roy Laughlin	Revival of 1984–85 production	
1993–94	L’étoile	Chabrier	Pamela Helen Stephen (Lazuli), Mary Hegarty (Princess Laoula), Paul Nilon (King Ouf), Jonathan Best/Richard Van Allan (Sirocco), Kate Flowers (Aloès), Alan Oke (Hérisson), Mark Curtis (Tapioca)	Valentin Reymond	Revival of 1991–92 production	
1993–94	**La rondine**	Puccini	Helen Field (Magda), Tito Beltrán (Ruggero), Peter Bronder (Prunier), Anna Maria Panzarella (Lisette), Peter Savidge (Rambaldo)	David Lloyd-Jones	Francesca; Zambello	Bruno Schwengl
1993–94	**The Magic Flute**	Mozart	William Burden (Tamino), Linda Kitchen (Pamina), William Dazeley (Papageno), John Rath (Sarastro), Eileen Hulse (Queen of the Night)	Andrew Parrott	Annabel Arden	Rae Smith
1993–94	**Playing Away** (world premiere)	Mason	Philip Sheffield (Terry Bond), Rebecca Caine (LA Lola), Richard Suart (Stan Stock)	Paul Daniel	David Pountney	Huntley Muir
1994–95	**Le roi malgré lui** (British premiere)	Chabrier	Russell Smythe (Henri), Justin Lavender (Nangis), Rosa Mannion (Minka), Nicholas Folwell (Laski)	Paul Daniel	Jeremy Sams	Lez Brotherston
1994–95	The Magic Flute	Mozart	William Burden (Tamino), Linda Kitchen (Pamina), Karl Daymond (Papageno), John Rath (Sarastro), Eileen Hulse (Queen of the Night)	Harry Bicket	Revival of 1993–94 production	
1994–95	**Il trovatore**	Verdi	Edmund Barham (Manrico), Katerina Kudriavchenko (Leonora), Sally Burgess/Claire Powell (Azucena), Ettore Kim (Count di Luna)	Paul Daniel/ Roy Laughlin	Inga Levant	Charles Edwards
1994–95	Il matrimonio segreto	Cimarosa	Paul Nilon (Paolino), Linda Kitchen (Carolina), Andrew Shore (Geronimo), Jonathan Best (Count Robinson), Mary Plazas (Elisetta), Tamsin Dives (Fidalma)	Richard Farnes	Jonathan Miller	John Conklin/ Stephen Rodwell
1994–95	**Oberto**	Verdi	John Tomlinson (Oberto), Rita Cullis (Leonora), David Maxwell Anderson (Riccardo) Linda Finnie (Cuniza)	David Porcelijn	John Tomlinson	Russell Craig
1994–95	Tosca	Puccini	Josephine Barstow/Marie Slorach (Tosca), Patrick Power (Cavaradossi), Matthew Best (Scarpia)	Stefano Ranzani	Revival of 1987–88 production	
1994–95	**Troilus and Cressida**	Walton	Arthur Davies (Troilus), Judith Howarth (Cressida), Nigel Robson (Pandarus), Alan Opie (Diomede), Clive Bayley (Calkas), Yvonne Howard (Evadne)	Richard Hickox/ Martin Pickard	Matthew Warchus	Neil Warmington
1994–95	Les pêcheurs de perles	Bizet	Arthur Davies (Nadir), André Cognet (Zurga), Maria D’Aragnes (Leila)	Dietfried Bernet	Revival of 1988–89 production	
1994–95	Orpheus in the Underworld	Offenbach	Jamie MacDougall (Orpheus), Yvonne Barclay (Euridice), Eric Roberts (Jupiter)	Paul McGrath	Revival of 1992–93 production	
1994–95	**Pelléas et Mélisande**	Debussy	Joan Rodgers (Mélisande), William Dazeley (Pelléas), Robert Hayward (Golaud)	Paul Daniel	Richard Jones	Antony McDonald /Nicky Gillibrand
1995–96	**Hamlet**	Thomas	Anthony Michaels-Moore/Karl Daymond (Hamlet), Rebecca Caine (Ophélie), Linda Finnie (Gertrude), Jan Galla (Claudius), John Rath (Ghost)	Oliver von Dohnányi	David McVicar	Michael Vale
1995–96	Les pêcheurs de perles	Bizet	Léonard Pezzino (Nadir), André Cognet/Peter Savidge (Zurga), Maria D’Aragnes (Leila)	Brad Cohen	Revival of 1988–89 production	
1995–96	**Jenůfa**	Janáček	Stephanie Friede (Jenůfa), Josephine Barstow (Kostelnička), Julian Gavin (Laca), Neill Archer/Jeffrey Stewart (Števa)	Paul Daniel	Tom Cairns	Tom Cairns
1995–96	**Luisa Miller**	Verdi	Susannah Glanville (Luisa), Arthur Davies (Rodolfo), Alan Opie (Miller), Matthew Best (Walter), Clive Bayley (Wurm)	Paul Daniel	Tim Albery	Stewart Lang
1995–96	La bohème	Puccini	Tito Beltrán/Alan Oke (Rodolfo), Margaret Richardson (Mimi), Karl Daymond (Marcello), Elena Ferrari (Musetta)	Jean‑Yves Ossonce /Martin Fitzpatrick	Revival of 1992–93 production	
1995–96	**Love Life**	Weill	Margaret Preece (Susan), Alan Oke (Sam), Geoffrey Dolton (Magician/Vaudevillian/Hobo)	Wyn Davies	Caroline Gawn	Charles Edwards/ Nicky Gillibrand
1995–96	**Médée**	Cherubini	Josephine Barstow (Médée), Thomas Randle (Jason), Nicola Sharkey (Dircé), Norman Bailey (Creon)	Paul Daniel	Phyllida Lloyd	Ian MacNeil/ Kandis Cook
1995–96	The Duenna	Gerhard	Susannah Glanville (Luisa), Ann Taylor (Clara), Adrian Clarke (Ferdinand), Neill Archer (Antonio), Richard Van Allan (Jerome), Eric Roberts (Isaac), Claire Powell (The Duenna)	Antoni Ros-Marbà	Revival of 1992–93 production	
1995–96	**The Marriage of Figaro**	Mozart	Clive Bayley (Figaro), Linda Kitchen (Susanna), William Dazeley (Count), Janis Kelly (Countess), Alice Coote/Ann Taylor (Cherubino)	Richard Farnes	Caroline Gawn	Alice Purcell
1996–97	The Marriage of Figaro	Mozart	Richard Whitehouse (Figaro), Mary Hegarty (Susanna), Roderick Williams (Count), Janis Kelly (Countess), Ann Taylor (Cherubino)	Paul Goodwin	Revival of 1995–96 production	
1996–97	**Madama Butterfly**	Puccini	Chen Sue (Butterfly), Mark Nicolson (Pinkerton), Peter Savidge/Simon Thorpe (Sharpless), Liane Keegan (Suzuki)	Marco Zambelli/ Martin Pickard/ Paul Daniel	Dalia; Ibelhauptaitė	Oleg Cheintsis
1996–97	**Iphigénie en Aulide**	Gluck	Lynne Dawson (Iphigenia), Neill Archer (Achilles), Christopher Purves (Agammemnon), Della Jones (Clytemnestra), John Rath (Calchas)	Valentin Reymond	Tim Hopkins	Nigel Lowery
1996–97	Wozzeck	Berg	Andrew Shore (Wozzeck), Josephine Barstow (Marie), Peter Bronder (Captain), Clive Bayley (Doctor), Jacque Trussel/Keith Mills (Drum-Major)	Paul Daniel	Revival of 1992–93 production	
1996–97	Gloriana	Britten	Josephine Barstow (Elizabeth I), Thomas Randle (Essex), Susannah Glanville (Lady Rich), Karl Daymond (Mountjoy), Ruth Peel (Lady Essex), Clive Bayley (Raleigh), Eric Roberts (Cecil)	James Holmes/ Paul Daniel	Revival of 1993–94 production	
1996–97	**Falstaff**	Verdi	Andrew Shore (Falstaff), Rita Cullis (Alice Ford), Robert Hayward (Ford), Paul Nilon (Fenton), Margaret Richardson (Nanetta), Frances McCafferty (Mistress Quickly), Yvonne Howard (Meg Page)	Paul Daniel	Matthew Warchus	Laura Hopkins
1996–97	**Il ritorno d'Ulisse in patria**	Monteverdi	Alice Coote (Penelope), Nigel Robson (Ulysses)	Harry Bicket/ Martin Pickard	Annabel Arden	Tim Hatley
1996–97	**Tannhäuser**	Wagner	Jeffrey Lawton (Tannhäuser), Rita Cullis (Elisabeth), Anne-Marie Owens (Venus), Keith Latham (Wolfram), Norman Bailey (Landgrave)	Paul Daniel/ James Holmes	David Fielding	David Fielding
1996–97	**Cosí fan tutte**	Mozart	Susannah Glanville (Fiordiligi), Emma Selway (Dorabella), Paul Nilon (Ferrando), William Dazeley (Guglielmo), Linda Kitchen (Despina), Jonathan Best (Don Alfonso)	Claire Gibault/ Martin Fitzpatrick	Tim Albery	Matthew Howland; Robin Rawstorne /Tania Spooner

== See also ==
- Opera North: history and repertoire, seasons 1978–79 to 1980–81
- Opera North: history and repertoire, seasons 1981–82 to 1989–90
- Opera North: history and repertoire, seasons 1997–98 to 2003–04
- Opera North: history and repertoire, seasons 2004–05 to present

== Sources ==
- Leeks, Stuart, ed. (2003). Opera North @ 25. Leeds: Opera North.
