= Opera North: history and repertoire, seasons 1997–98 to 2003–04 =

UK opera company

Opera North is an opera company based at The Grand Theatre, Leeds, England. This article covers the period between the departure of Paul Daniel (music director 1990–1997) and the arrival of Richard Farnes (music director 2004–present).

== History ==
During the seasons 1997–8 and 1998–9, while the company was looking for a successor to Daniel, Elgar Howarth held the title of Music Advisor. The company mounted ten new productions and seven revivals, led by a total of eighteen different conductors, among them Steuart Bedford, Wyn Davies, Oliver von Dohnányi, Paul Goodwin and András Ligeti, as well as Howarth himself, Paul Daniel, Richard Farnes and Steven Sloane, who became Music Director in 1999. When he departed in 2002, Sloane had conducted a further ten new productions and two revivals, while fifteen other conductors, including Stephen Barlow, Harry Bicket and David Parry were also employed by the company.

Another interregnum (2002–4) ensued before the appointment of Sloane's successor, Richard Farnes, with new names on the podium including Martin André, Martyn Brabbins, Frédéric Chaslin, William Lacey, Sebastian Lang-Lessing, Grant Llewellyn and Mark Shanahan.

There was one world premiere during this period – Simon Holt's The Nightingale's to Blame – and a number of rarities: Martinů's Julietta, Schumann's Genoveva, Verdi's Giovanna d'Arco, Handel's Radamisto and Shostakovich's operetta Paradise Moscow. The Bartered Bride was successfully updated to the Prague Spring period, Tristan und Isolde was semi-staged at Leeds Town Hall and elsewhere, and musical theatre was represented by George Gershwin's Of Thee I Sing and Stephen Sondheim's Sweeney Todd.

The unusual final segment of the 2003–4 season attracted a great deal of interest and a number of awards. Under the title "Eight Little Greats", the company presented eight one-act operas, each by a different composer. Two were performed per night and additionally there were two-opera matinées on Saturdays, all in various combinations. Operas could be booked individually or as double-bills. A company of 21 principals was assembled, and most of them appeared in more than one of the operas. Four operas were directed by David Pountney and four by Christopher Alden; three were conducted by Martin André and four by David Parry; Johan Engels was responsible for all of the sets and three different costume designers were engaged.

== Repertoire ==
Below is a list of main stage (Note: "Main stage" means operas performed at Leeds Grand Theatre and a number of touring venues; small-scale productions are not included. Semi-staged concert performances at Leeds Town Hall and other similar venues are included, but concert performances without any staging are not.) operas performed by the company during this period.

Season	Opera (Note: Titles in Bold are new productions. Opera titles are those used in Wikipedia and not necessarily those used by Opera North.)	Composer	Principal cast	Conductor	Director	Designer (Note: Where two designers are credited, the first-named designed the set and the second designed the costumes)
1997–98	Aida	Verdi	Josephine Barstow (Aida), Edmund Barham (Radames), Sally Burgess (Amneris), Jonathan Summers (Amonasro)	Giuliano Carella	Revival of 1985–6 production	
1997–98	Così fan tutte	Mozart	Elena Ferrari (Fiordiligi), Alice Coote/Claire Evans (Dorabella), Jeffrey Stewart (Ferrando), Garry Magee (Guglielmo), Margaret Preece (Despina), Eric Roberts (Don Alfonso)	Martin Fitzpatrick	Revival of 1996–7 production	
1997–98	**Julietta**	Martinů	Rebecca Caine (Julietta), Paul Nilon (Mischa)	Steuart Bedford	David Pountney	Stefanos Lazaridis /Marie-Jeanne; Lecca
1997–98	**The Magic Flute**	Mozart	Jamie MacDougall/Jeffrey Stewart (Tamino), Margaret Richardson (Pamina), Eric Roberts (Papageno), Clive Bayley (Sarastro), Cara O'Sullivan/Laure Meloy (Queen of the Night)	Brad Cohen/ Martin Pickard	Annabel Arden	Roswitha Gerlitz
1997–98	**Sweeney Todd**	Sondheim	Steven Page (Sweeney Todd), Beverley Klein (Mrs Lovett)	James Holmes	David McVicar	Michael Vale/ Kevin Knight
1997–98	The Barber of Seville	Rossini	Roderick Williams (Figaro), Ann Taylor (Rosina), Iain Paton (Almaviva), Eric Roberts (Dr Bartolo)	Daniel Beckwith/ Dominic Wheeler	Revival of 1986–7 production	
1997–98	**Eugene Onegin**	Tchaikovsky	Alwyn Mellor (Tatyana), Peter Savidge (Onegin), Paul Nilon (Lensky), Emer McGilloway (Olga)	Steven Sloane/ Martin Pickard	Dalia Ibelhauptaitė	Giles Cadle/ Sue Willmington
1997–98	**Giovanna d'Arco**	Verdi	Susannah Glanville (Giovanna), Julian Gavin (Carlo VII), Keith Latham (Giacomo)	Richard Farnes	Philip Prowse	Philip Prowse
1997–98	**Of Thee I Sing**	Gershwin	William Dazeley (Wintergreen), Margaret Preece (Mary), Kim Criswell (Diana Devereux), Steven Beard (Alexander Throttlebottom)	Wyn Davies	Caroline Gawn	Charles Edwards/ Nicky Gillibrand
1998–99	Il re pastore	Mozart	Rebecca Caine (Amyntas), Mary Hegarty (Elisa), Peter Bronder (Alexander), Alice Coote (Tamyris), Nicholas Sears (Agenor)	Paul Goodwin	Revival of 1993–4 production	
1998–99	**The Bartered Bride**	Smetana	Alwin Mellor (Mařenka), Neill Archer (Jeník), Clive Bayley (Kecal), Iain Paton (Vašek)	Oliver von Dohnányi	Daniel Slater	Robert; Innes Hopkins
1998–99	Don Carlos	Verdi	Julian Gavin (Carlos), Lori Phillips (Elisabetta), Jeffrey Black (Posa), Alastair Miles (Philip II), Sally Burgess (Eboli)	Yves Abel	Revival of 1992–3 production	
1998–99	**The Nightingale's to Blame**	Holt	Donald Maxwell (Perlimpin), Patricia Rozario (Belisa), Fiona Kimm (Marcolfa), Frances McCafferty (Belisa’s mother)	Richard Farnes	Martin Duncan	Neil Irish
1998–99	**Carmen**	Bizet	Ruby Philogene (Carmen), Antoni Garfield Henry (Don José), Mark Stone (Escamillo), Susannah Glanville/Majella Cullagh (Micaela)	András Ligeti	Phyllida Lloyd	Tim Hatley
1998–99	La gazza ladra	Rossini	Mary Hegarty (Ninetta), Jeffrey Stewart (Giannetto), Christopher Purves (Podestà), Jonathan Best (Fernando), Ann Taylor (Pippo)	David Charles Abell	Revival of 1991–2 production	
1998–99	**Arabella**	R Strauss	Susannah Glanville (Arabella), Robert Hayward (Mandryka), Isabel Molnar (Zdenka), Jeffrey Lloyd-Roberts (Matteo), Richard Angas (Waldner), Carole Wilson (Adelaide)	Elgar Howarth	Francisco Negrin	Paul Steinberg/ Jon Morrell
1998–99	Gloriana	Britten	Josephine Barstow (Elizabeth I), Thomas Randle (Essex), Susannah Glanville (Lady Rich), David Ellis (Mountjoy), Emer McGilloway (Lady Essex), Clive Bayley (Raleigh), Eric Roberts (Cecil)	Paul Daniel	Revival of 1993–4 production	
1999–00	**La traviata**	Verdi	Janis Kelly (Violetta), Thomas Randle (Alfredo), Keith Latham (Germont)	Richard Farnes/ Martin Pickard	Annabel Arden	Nicky Gillibrand
1999–00	**Káťa Kabanová**	Janáček	Vivian Tierney (Katya), Alan Oke (Boris), Jamie MacDougall (Kudryash), Ann Taylor (Varvara), Gillian Knight (Kabanicha)	Steven Sloane	Tim Albery	Hildegard Bechtler
1999–00	**Don Giovanni**	Mozart	Garry Magee (Don Giovanni), Majella Cullach (Donna Anna), Claron McFadden/Emma Bell (Donna Elvira), Jonathan Best/Iain Patterson (Leporello), ??? (Don Ottavio)	Dominic Wheeler	David McVicar	Kevin Knight
1999–00	**A Midsummer Night's Dream**	Britten	Christopher Josey (Oberon), Claron McFadden (Tytania), Jonathan Best (Bottom), Nicholas Sears (Lysander), Helen Williams (Helena), Ann Taylor (Hermia), Mark Stone (Demetrius)	Steven Sloane	Moshe Leiser & Patrice Caurier	Christian Fenouillat /Agostino Cavalca
1999–00	Madama Butterfly	Puccini	Lada Biriucov/Rosalind Sutherland (Butterfly), Julian Gavin/David Maxwell Anderson (Pinkerton), Steven Page (Sharpless), Jane Irwin (Suzuki)	Stephen Barlow	Revival of 1996-7 production	
1999–00	Falstaff	Verdi	Conal Coad (Falstaff), Josephine Barstow (Alice Ford), Brent Ellis (Ford), Wynne Evans (Fenton), Thora Einarsdottir (Nanetta), Frances McCafferty (Mistress Quickly), Yvonne Howard (Meg Page)	Steven Sloane/ Lionel Friend	Revival of 1996–7 production	
1999–00	La Gioconda	Ponchielli	Claire Rutter (Gioconda), David Maxwell Anderson (Enzo), Katja Lytting (Laura), Jonathan Summers (Barnaba)	Oliver von Dohnányi	Revival of 1992–3 production	
1999–00	**Radamisto**	Handel	David Walker (Radamisto), Alice Coote (Zenobia), Helen Williams (Polissena), Emma Bell (Tigrane), Michael John Pearson (Tiridate), Elizabeth McCormack (Fraarte)	Harry Bicket	Tim Hopkins	Charles Edwards
1999–00	Orpheus in the Underworld	Offenbach	Jamie MacDougall (Orpheus), Yvonne Barclay (Euridice), Eric Roberts (Jupiter)	Wyn Davies	Revival of 1992–3 production	
2000–01	**Genoveva**	Schumann	Patricia Schuman (Genoveva), Christopher Purves (Siegfried), Paul Nilon (Golo), Clive Bayley (Drago), Keith Latham (Hidulfus), Sally Burgess (Margaretha)	Steven Sloane/ James Holmes	David Pountney	Ralph Koltai/ Sue Willmington
2000–01	The Marriage of Figaro	Mozart	James Rutherford/Christopher Purves (Figaro), Colette Delahunt (Susanna), Roderick Williams/Stephan Loges (Count), Majella Cullagh/Simone Sauphanor (Countess), Emer McGilloway (Cherubino)	Roderick Bryden /Stephen Clarke	Revival of 1995–6 production	
2000–01	La rondine	Puccini	Janis Kelly (Magda), Jorge Antonio Pita (Ruggero), Wynne Evans (Prunier), Mary Hegarty (Lisette), Jonathan Best (Rambaldo)	Dietfried Bernet	Revival of 1993–4 production	
2000–01	**L'elisir d'amore**	Donizetti	Mary Hegarty (Adina), Paul Nilon (Nemorino), Christopher Purves (Dulcamara), Richard Whitehouse (Belcore)	David Parry	Daniel Slater	Robert Innes; Hopkins
2000–01	Pelléas et Mélisande	Debussy	Joan Rodgers (Mélisande), William Dazeley (Pelléas), Robert Hayward (Golaud)	Paul Daniel/ James Holmes	Revival of 1994–5 production	
2000–01	**Tristan und Isolde** (Note: Semi-staged concert performances.)	Wagner	Mark Lundberg (Tristan), Susan Bullock (Isolde), Anne-Marie Owens (Brangäne), John Wegner (Kurwenal), Donald McIntyre (King Marke)	Steven Sloane	Keith Warner	Keith Warner/ Elaine Robertson
2000–01	Eugene Onegin	Tchaikovsky	Giselle Allen (Tatyana), William Dazeley/Richard Whitehouse (Onegin), Iain Paton (Lensky), Cécile van de Sant (Olga)	Richard Farnes	Revival of 1997–8 production	
2000–01	**Moscow, Cheryomushki**	Shostakovich	Alan Oke (Sergei), Rachel Taylor (Lusya), Janie Dee (Lidochka), Loren Geeting (Boris), Daniel Broad (Sasha), Gillian Kirkpatrick (Masha)	Steven Sloane/ James Holmes	David Pountney	Robert Innes; Hopkins
2001–02	**The Cunning Little Vixen**	Janáček	Janis Kelly (Vixen), Christopher Purves (Forester), Giselle Allen (Fox), Nigel Robson (Schoolmaster), Richard Angas/Michael John Pearson (Priest)	Steven Sloane	Annabel Arden	Richard Hudson
2001–02	La bohème	Puccini	Harrie van der Plas/Peter Auty (Rodolfo), Mary Plazas/Barbara Haveman (Mimi), William Dazeley/Mark Stone (Marcello), Christine Buffle/Giselle Allen (Musetta)	Steven Sloane/ Dietfried Bernet	Revival of 1992–3 production	
2001–02	Gloriana	Britten	Josephine Barstow (Elizabeth I), Thomas Randle (Essex), Susannah Glanville (Lady Rich), Karl Daymond (Mountjoy), Ruth Peel (Lady Essex), Mark Beesley (Raleigh), Eric Roberts (Cecil)	Richard Farnes	Revival of 1993–4 production	
2001–02	**Albert Herring**	Britten	Iain Paton (Albert), Josephine Barstow (Lady Billows), Richard Whitehouse (Sid), Heather Shipp (Nancy), Ethna Robinson (Mrs Herring)	James Holmes	Phyllida Lloyd	Scott Pask
2001–02	Sweeney Todd	Sondheim	Steven Page (Sweeney Todd), Beverley Klein (Mrs Lovett)	James Holmes	Revival of 1997–8 production	
2001–02	**L'enfant et les sortilèges** (Note: Performed as a double-bill with Petrushka)	Ravel	Claire Wild (The child),	Emmanuel Plasson	Amir; Hosseinpour/ Nigel Lowery	Nigel Lowery
2001–02	**Oedipus rex**	Stravinsky	Stuart Skelton (Oedipus), Natascha Petrinsky (Jocasta), Ashley Holland (Creon), Jeremy White (Tiresias)	Steven Sloane	Charles Edwards	Charles Edwards
2002–03	**Tosca**	Puccini	Nina Pavlovski/Susannah Glanville (Tosca), Rafael Rojas/Ian Storey (Cavaradossi), Robert McFarland/Matthew Best (Scarpia)	Steven Sloane/ Richard Farnes	Christopher Alden	Charles Edwards/ Jon Morrell
2002–03	Jenůfa	Janáček	Giselle Allen (Jenůfa), Josephine Barstow (Kostelnička), Jeffrey Lloyd-Roberts (Laca), Kevin Anderson (Števa)	Elgar Howarth	Revival of 1995–6 production	
2002–03	**Der Rosenkavalier**	R Strauss	Deanne Meek (Octavian), Janis Kelly (Marschallin), Conal Coad (Baron Ochs), Marie Arnet (Sophie), Christopher Purves (Faninal)	Dietfried Bernet	David McVicar	David McVicar & Michael Vale/ Tanya McCallin
2002–03	Il matrimonio segreto	Cimarosa	Wynne Evans (Paolino), Mary Nelson (Carolina), Henry Waddington (Geronimo), Richard Morrison (Count Robinson), Natasha Jouhl (Elisetta), Louise Mott (Fidalma)	Wyn Davies	Revival of 1994-5 production	
2002–03	**Idomeneo**	Mozart	Paul Nilon (Idomeneo), Paula Hoffman (Idamante), Natasha Marsh (Ilia), Janis Kelly (Elettra)	David Parry	Tim Albery	Dany Lyne
2002–03	Julietta	Martinů	Rebecca Caine (Julietta), Paul Nilon (Mischa),	Martin André	Revival of 1997–8 production	
2002–03	**The Magic Flute**	Mozart	Philippe Do (Tamino), Thora Einarsdottir (Pamina), Matthew Sharpe (Papageno), Mark Coles (Sarastro), Helen Williams (Queen of the Night)	William Lacey	Tim Supple	Jean Kalman/ Tom Pye
2002–03	**La damnation de Faust**	Berlioz	Stephen O’Mara (Faust), Alastair Miles (Mephistophélès), Lilli Paasikivi (Marguérite)	Frederic Chaslin	Matthias Janser	
2003–04	La traviata	Verdi	Janis Kelly/Anne-Sophie Duprels (Violetta), Thomas Randle/Peter Auty (Alfredo), Robert McFarland/Robert Poulton (Germont)	Mark Shanahan/ Richard Farnes	Revival of 1999–2000 production	
2003–04	**Rusalka**	Dvořák	Giselle Allen (Rusalka), Stuart Skelton (Prince), Richard Angas (Water Sprite), Susannah Glanville (Foreign Princess), Susan Bickley (Jezibaba)	Sebastian; Lang-Lessing	Olivia Fuchs	Nicki Turner
2003–04	**Manon**	Massenet	Malin Byström (Manon), Julian Gavin (Des Grieux), William Dazeley (Lescaut)	Grant Llewellyn	Daniel Slater	Francis O’Connor
2003–04	The Barber of Seville	Rossini	Garry Magee (Figaro), Deanne Meek (Rosina), Nick Sales (Almaviva), Eric Roberts (Dr Bartolo)	Wyn Davies	Revival of 1986–7 production	
2003–04	The Bartered Bride	Smetana	Giselle Allen (Mařenka), Jeffrey Lloyd-Roberts (Jeník), Jeremy White (Kecal), Iain Paton (Vašek)	Martyn Brabbins	Revival of 1998–9 production	
2003–04	**Der Zwerg**	Zemlinsky	Paul Nilon (The Dwarf), Stefanie Krahnenfeld (Donna Clara), Majella Cullagh (Gita), Graeme Broadbent (Don Estoban)	David Parry	David Pountney	Johan Engels/ Marie-Jeanne; Lecca
2003–04	**La vida breve**	Falla	Mary Plazas (Salud), Leonardo Capalbo (Paco), Susan Gorton (Grandmother)	Martin André	Christopher Alden	Johan Engels/ Sue Willmington
2003–04	**Il tabarro**	Puccini	Nina Pavlovski (Giorgetta), Jonathan Summers (Michele), Leonardo Capalbo (Luigi), Anne-Marie Owens (La Frugola)	Martin André	David Pountney	Johan Engels/ Sue Willmington
2003–04	**L'occasione fa il ladro**	Rossini	Mark Stone (Don Parmenione), Iain Paton (Count Alberto), Majella Cullagh (Berenice), Kim-Marie Woodhouse (Ernestina), Adrian Clarke (Martino), Nicholas Sharratt (Don Eusebio)	David Parry	Christopher Alden	Johan Engels/ Tom Pye
2003–04	**Francesca da Rimini**	Rachmaninoff	Nina Pavlovski (Francesca), Jeffrey Lloyd-Roberts (Dante/Paolo), Jonathan Summers (Ghost of Virgil/Malatesta)	Martin André	David Pountney	Johan Engels/ Sue Willmington
2003–04	**Pagliacci**	Leoncavallo	Geraint Dodd (Canio), Majella Cullagh (Nedda), Jonathan Summers (Tonio), Iain Paton (Beppe), Mark Stone (Silvio)	David Parry	Christopher Alden	Johan Engels/ Sue Willmington
2003–04	**Djamileh**	Bizet	Patricia Bardon (Djamileh), Paul Nilon (Haroun), Mark Stone (Splendiano)	David Parry	Christopher Alden	Johan Engels/ Sue Willmington
2003–04	**The Seven Deadly Sins**	Weill	Beate Vollack (Anna I), Iain Paton (Tenor I), Nicholas Sharratt (Tenor II), Adrian Clarke (Father), Graeme Broadbent (Mother)	James Holmes	David Pountney	Johan Engels/ Marie-Jeanne; Lecca

== See also ==
- Opera North: history and repertoire, seasons 1978–79 to 1980–81
- Opera North: history and repertoire, seasons 1981–82 to 1989–90
- Opera North: history and repertoire, seasons 1990–91 to 1996–97
- Opera North: history and repertoire, seasons 2004–05 to present
