= Opera North: history and repertoire, seasons 2004–05 to present =

UK opera company season 2004

Opera North is an opera company based at The Grand Theatre, Leeds, England. This article covers the period during which the music director has been Richard Farnes.

== History ==
Unusually, the 2004–05 season opened with five new productions. One of them, Orfeo ed Euridice, premiered at the Edinburgh International Festival and was subsequently seen at the Monaco Dance Centre in Monte Carlo as well as in Leeds, Newcastle, Nottingham and Salford. It was the company's first collaborative production with a dance company (Emio Greco | PC).

After the Grand Theatre's closure in June 2005 for the commencement of the Leeds Grand Theatre Transformation project, the final three productions in the theatre toured to Hull New Theatre, the Theatre Royal, Norwich, the Lyceum Theatre, Sheffield, and the Grand Opera House, Belfast, as well as the company's regular venues in the North of England. One of these productions was One Touch of Venus, with a libretto by S. J. Perelman and Ogden Nash and music by Kurt Weill, another of the company's trademark performances of musical theatre works.

During the Transformation project, Opera North presented a number of semi-staged and concert performances in venues such as Leeds Town Hall, the Bridgewater Hall, Manchester, Nottingham Royal Concert Hall, Sage Gateshead and Symphony Hall, Birmingham, as well as performances at the Bradford Alhambra and other theatres, including, for the first time, His Majesty's Theatre, Aberdeen.

Phase 1 of Transformation was completed in the autumn of 2006. As well as much-needed renovations to the Grand Theatre itself, it created a permanent home and Opera Centre for Opera North, with two large rehearsal spaces that are the same size as the theatre's stage. The company returned to the theatre in October of that year with new productions of Rigoletto and Peter Grimes. The latter production, directed by Phyllida Lloyd, was garlanded with awards from The South Bank Show, the Royal Philharmonic Society and the Theatre Management Association.

During 2007–08, a mini-festival of operas inspired by William Shakespeare was presented by Opera North. It comprised Verdi's Falstaff and Macbeth, Britten's A Midsummer Night's Dream, Gounod's Roméo et Juliette and Bellini's I Capuleti e i Montecchi. The latter saw the first appearance with the company by Sarah Connolly, who returned in 2010 for Donizetti's Maria Stuarda.

A second phase of Transformation, completed in 2009, focused on restoring the former Assembly Rooms, which originally opened in 1879, as a small-scale performance space managed by Opera North. Now called the Howard Assembly Room, it hosts a variety of musical and other events, one of which was the world premiere performance by Opera North in late 2009 of Jonathan Dove's chamber opera Swanhunter, based on the Lemminkäinen legend.

Opera North's collaborations with other opera companies and festivals during this period included:

- Così fan tutte, a co-production with Glimmerglass Opera, which premiered in Leeds and was also seen at New York City Opera
- Kurt Weill's Der Kuhhandel (Arms and the Cow), a co-production with the Bregenz Festival and the Vienna Volksoper
- Reinhard Keiser's Croesus, a co-production with Minnesota Opera
- Jonathan Dove's The Adventures of Pinocchio, a co-production with Chemnitz Opera

Company visits abroad included taking Julietta and One Touch of Venus to the Ravenna Festival and Skin Deep, Of Thee I Sing and Moscow, Cheryomushki to Bregenz.

== Repertoire ==
Below is a list of main stage (Note: "Main stage" means operas performed at Leeds Grand Theatre and a number of touring venues; small-scale productions performed only in spaces such as the Howard Assembly Room are not included. Semi-staged concert performances at Leeds Town Hall and other similar venues are included, but concert performances without any staging are not.) operas performed by the company during this period.

| Season | Opera (Note: Titles in Bold are new productions. Opera titles are those used in Wikipedia and not necessarily those used by Opera North.) | Composer | Principal cast | Conductor | Director | Designer (Note: Where two designers are credited, the first-named designed the set and the second designed the costumes) |
|---|---|---|---|---|---|---|
| 2004–05 | **Orfeo ed Euridice** | Gluck | Daniel Taylor (Orfeo), Isabel Monar (Euridice), Claire Ormshaw (Amor) | Nicholas Kok | Emio Greco | Pieter C Sholten /Clifford Portier |
| 2004–05 | **Manon Lescaut** | Puccini | Natalia Dercho (Manon), Hugh Smith (Des Grieux), Christopher Purves (Lescaut) | Richard Farnes | Daniel Slater | Robert Innes; Hopkins |
| 2004–05 | **Così fan tutte** | Mozart | Malin Byström (Fiordiligi), Ann Taylor (Dorabella), Iain Paton (Ferrando), Roderick Williams (Guglielmo), Claire Wild (Despina), Peter Savidge (Don Alfonso) | Yves Abel | Tim Albery | Tobias Hoheisel |
| 2004–05 | **One Touch of Venus** | Weill | Karen Coker (Venus), Loren Geeting (Rodney Hatch), Christianne Tisdale (Molly), Ron Li-Paz (Whitelaw Savory) | James Holmes | Tim Albery | Antony McDonald /Emma Ryott |
| 2004–05 | **Don Giovanni** | Mozart | Roderick Williams (Don Giovanni), Susannah Glanville (Donna Anna), Giselle Allen (Donna Elvira), Andrew Foster-Williams (Leporello), Iain Paton (Don Ottavio) | Richard Farnes | Olivia Fuchs | Niki Turner |
| 2004–05 | La gazza ladra | Rossini | Mary Hegarty (Ninetta), Ashley Catling (Giannetto), Robert Poulton (Podestà), Jonathan Best (Fernando), Anne-Marie Gibbons (Pippo) | David Parry | Revival of 1991–2 production | |
| 2004–05 | **Bluebeard's Castle** (Note: Semi-staged production, performed as a double-bill with concert performances of Daphnis et Chloé.) | Bartók | John Tomlinson (Bluebeard), Sally Burgess (Judith) | Richard Farnes | Giles Havergal | Adam Wiltshire |
| 2005–06 | **Saul** (Note: Semi-staged concert performances) | Handel | Robert Hayward (Saul), Tim Mead (David), Lucy Crowe (Michal), Sarah Fox (Merab), Mark Wilde (Jonathan) | Christian Curnyn | John Fulljames | Soutra Gilmour |
| 2005–06 | **Hänsel und Gretel''** | Humperdinck | Julianne Young (Hänsel), Jeni Bern (Gretel), Peter Hoare (Witch), Christopher Purves (Peter) | Richard Farnes | John Fulljames | Soutra Gilmour |
| 2005–06 | The Marriage of Figaro | Mozart | Wyn Pencarreg (Figaro), Jenni Bern/Lucy Crowe (Susanna), Howard Reddy/James McOran-Campbell (Count), Linda Richardson (Countess), Julianne Young (Cherubino) | Christian Gansch | Revival of 1995–6 production | |
| 2005–06 | La rondine | Puccini | Janis Kelly (Magda), Rafael Rojas (Ruggero), Alan Oke (Prunier), Gail Pearson (Lisette), Peter Savidge/Jonathan Best (Rambaldo) | Richard Farnes | Revival of 1993–4 production | |
| 2005–06 | **Der Kuhhandel** | Weill | Leonardo Capalbo (Juan), Mary Plazas/Deborah Norman (Juanita), Jeffrey Lawton (Mendez), Adrian Clarke (Jones), Robert Burt (Ximenes), Donald Maxwell (Conchas) | James Holmes | David Pountney | Duncan Hayler |
| 2006–07 | **Rigoletto** | Verdi | Alan Opie/Jonathan Summers (Rigoletto), Rafael Rojas (Duke), Henriette Bonde-Hansen/Linda Richardson (Gilda) | Martin André/ Mark Shanahan | Charles Edwards | Charles Edwards |
| 2006–07 | **Peter Grimes** | Britten | Jeffrey Lloyd-Roberts (Grimes), Giselle Allen (Ellen Orford), Christopher Purves (Balstrode) | Richard Farnes | Phyllida Lloyd | Anthony Ward |
| 2006–07 | **La voix humaine** | Poulenc | Joan Rodgers (Elle) | Paul Watkins | Tom Pye | Tom Pye |
| 2006–07 | The Magic Flute | Mozart | Ed Lyon/Peter Wedd (Tamino), Noriko Urata (Pamina), Roderick Williams/Riccardo Simonetti (Papageno), Chester Patton (Sarastro), Penelope Randall-Davis (Queen of the Night) | Paul McGrath | Revival of 2002-3 production | |
| 2006–07 | L'elisir d'amore | Donizetti | Anna Ryberg (Adina), Andrew Kennedy (Nemorino), Peter Savidge (Dulcamara), Riccardo Simonetti (Belcore) | Tecwyn Evans | Revival of 2000–1 production | |
| 2006–07 | **L'Orfeo** | Monteverdi | Paul Nilon (Orfeo) | Christopher; Moulds | Christopher Alden | Paul Steinberg /Doey Lüethi |
| 2006–07 | **Káťa Kabanová** | Janáček | Giselle Allen (Katya), Peter Wedd (Boris), Ashley Catling (Kudryash), Wendy Dawn Thompson (Varvara), Sally Burgess (Kabanicha) | Richard Farnes | Tim Albery | Hildegard Bechtler |
| 2006–07 | **Dido and Aeneas** (Note: Performed as a double-bill with Les noces) | Purcell | Susan Bickley (Dido), Amy Freston (Belinda), Adam Green (Aeneas) | Nicholas Kok | Aletta Collins | Giles Cadle/ Gabriella Dalton |
| 2007–08 | Falstaff | Verdi | Robert Hayward (Falstaff), Susannah Glanville (Alice Ford), Olafur Sigurdarson (Ford), Ashley Catling (Fenton), Valérie Condoluci (Nanetta), Susan Bickley (Mistress Quickly), Deanne Meek (Meg Page) | Richard Farnes | Revival of 1996–7 production | |
| 2007–08 | **Croesus** | Keiser | Paul Nilon (Croesus), Michael Maniaci (Atis), Gillian Keith (Elmira), Henry Waddington (Cyrus), William Dazeley (Orsanes), Fflur Wyn (Clerida) | Harry Bicket | Tim Albery | Leslie Travers |
| 2007–08 | **The Adventures of** **Pinocchio** (world premiere) | Dove | Victoria Simmonds (Pinocchio), Jonathan Summers (Geppetto), Mary Plazas (Blue Fairy), Mark Wilde (Cat), James Laing (Fox) | David Parry | Martin Duncan | Francis O’Connor |
| 2007–08 | Peter Grimes | Britten | Jeffrey Lloyd-Roberts (Grimes), Giselle Allen (Ellen Orford), Christopher Purves (Balstrode) | Richard Farnes | Revival of 2006–7 production | |
| 2007–08 | **Macbeth** | Verdi | Robert Hayward (Macbeth), Antonia Cifrone/Yvonne Howard (Lady Macbeth), Peter Auty (Macduff) | Richard Farnes/ Martin Pickard | Tim Albery | Johan Engels/ Brigitte Reiffenstuel |
| 2007–08 | **A Midsummer**; **Night's Dream** | Britten | James Laing (Oberon), Jeni Bern (Tytania), Henry Waddington (Bottom), Peter Wedd (Lysander), Elizabeth Atherton (Helena), Frances Bourne (Hermia), Mark Stone (Demetrius) | Stuart Stratford | Martin Duncan | Johan Engels /Ashley; Martin-Davis |
| 2007–08 | **Roméo et Juliette** | Gounod | Leonardo Capalbo (Roméo), Bernarda Bobro (Juliette), Frances Bourne (Stéphano), Stephan Loges (Mercutio), Henry Waddington (Frère Laurent) | Martin André/ Peter Selwyn | John Fulljames | Johan Engels/ Adam Wiltshire |
| 2008–09 | Of Thee I Sing | Gershwin | William Dazeley (Wintergreen), Bibi Heal (Mary), Heather Shipp (Diana Devereux), Steven Beard (Alexander Throttlebottom) | Mark W Dorrell | Revival of 1997–8 production | |
| 2008–09 | Tosca | Puccini | Takesha Meshé Kizart (Tosca), Rafael Rojas (Cavaradossi), Robert Hayward (Scarpia) | Andrea Licata/ Martin Pickard | Revival of 2002–3 production | |
| 2008–09 | **I Capuleti e** **i Montecchi** | Bellini | Sarah Connolly (Romeo), Marie Arnett (Giulietta), Edgaras Montvidas (Tebaldo) | Manlio Benzi | Orpha Phelan | Leslie Travers |
| 2008–09 | **Skin Deep** (world premiere) | Sawer | Geoffrey Dolton (Needlemeier), Janis Kelly (Lania), Heather Shipp (Donna), Amy Freston (Elsa), Andrew Tortise (Robert), Mark Stone/Riccardo Simonetti (Luke), Gwendoline Christie (Susannah) | Richard Farnes | Richard Jones | Stewart Laing |
| 2008–09 | **Let 'Em Eat Cake** | Gershwin | William Dazeley (Wintergreen), Bibi Heal (Mary), Steven Beard (Alexander Throttlebottom), Richard Burkhard (Kruger), Richard Suart (General Snookfield) | Wyn Davies/ Mark W Dorrell | Caroline Gawn | Tim Hopkins/ Gabrielle Dalton |
| 2008–09 | Moscow, Cheryomushki | Shostakovich | Philip O’Brien (Sergei), Claire Pascoe (Lusya), Summer Strallen (Lidochka), Eaton James (Boris), Grant Doyle (Sasha), Bibi Heal (Masha) | James Holmes | Revival of 2000–1 production | |
| 2008–09 | Don Carlos | Verdi | Julian Gavin (Carlos), Janice Watson (Elisabetta), William Dazeley (Posa), Brindley Sherratt/Alastair Miles (Philip II), Jane Dutton (Eboli) | Richard Farnes | Revival of 1992–3 production | |
| 2008–09 | **Die Entführung** **aus dem Serail** | Mozart | Kate Valentine (Konstanze), Allan Clayton/Joshua Ellicott (Belmonte), Clive Bayley (Osmin), Elena Xanthoudakis (Blonde), Nicholas Sharratt (Pedrillo) | Rory Macdonald | Tim Hopkins | Tim Hopkins/ Gideon Davey |
| 2009–10 | Così fan tutte | Mozart | Elizabeth Atherton (Fiordiligi), Victoria Simmonds (Dorabella), Allan Clayton (Ferrando), Quirijn de Lang (Guglielmo), Amy Freston (Despina), Geoffrey Dolton (Don Alfonso) | Andrew Parrott/ Justin Doyle | Revival of 2004–5 production | |
| 2009–10 | **Werther** | Massenet | Paul Nilon (Werther), Alice Coote/Ann Taylor (Charlotte), Fflur Wyn (Sophie) | Richard Farnes | Tom Cairns | Hildegard Bechtler /Amy Roberts |
| 2009–10 | **The Excursions of** **Mr. Brouček to the** **Moon and to the** **15th Century** | Janáček | John Graham-Hall (Brouček), Jeffrey Lloyd-Roberts (Mazal), Anne Sophie Duprels (Málinka), Donald Maxwell (Würfl), Jonathan Best (Sacristan) | Martin André | John Fulljames | Alex Lowde |
| 2009–10 | La bohème | Puccini | Bülent Bezdüz (Rodolfo), Anne Sophie Duprels (Mimi), Marcin Bronikowski (Marcello), Sarah Fox (Musetta) | Richard Farnes/ Geoffrey Paterson | Revival of 1992–3 production | |
| 2009–10 | **Ruddigore** | Sullivan | Grant Doyle (Robin/Ruthven), Amy Freston (Rose), Hal Cazalet (Richard), Richard Burkhardt (Despard), Heather Shipp (Mad Margaret), Steven Page (Sir Roderic), Anne-Marie Owens (Dame Hannah) | John Wilson/ Anthony Kraus | Jo Davies | Richard Hudson/ Gabrielle Dalton |
| 2009–10 | Rusalka | Dvořák | Giselle Allen (Rusalka), Richard Berkeley-Steele (Prince), Richard Angas (Water Sprite), Susannah Glanville (Foreign Princess), Anne-Marie Owens (Jezibaba) | Oliver von Dohnanyi | Revival of 2003–4 production | |
| 2009–10 | **Maria Stuarda** | Donizetti | Sarah Connolly (Maria), Antonia Cifrone (Elisabetta), Bülent Bezdüz (Leicester), David Kempster (Cecil), Frédéric Bourreau (Talbot) | Guido Johannes; Rumstadt | Antony McDonald | Antony McDonald |
| 2010–11 | The Adventures of Pinocchio | Dove | Victoria Simmonds/Karina Lucas (Pinocchio), Jonathan Summers (Geppetto), Mary Plazas/Fflur Wyn (Blue Fairy), Mark Wilde (Cat), James Laing (Fox) | David Parry/Robert Houssart | Revival of 2007–8 production | |
| 2010–11 | **The Turn of the Screw** | Britten | Elizabeth Atherton (Governess), Benjamin Hulett (Prologue/Quint), Giselle Allen (Miss Jessel), James Micklethwaite (Miles), Fflur Wyn (Flora), Yvonne Howard (Mrs Grose) | Richard Farnes | Alessandro Talevi | Madeleine Boyd |
| 2010–11 | **The Merry Widow** | Lehár | Stephanie Corley (Hanna Glawari), William Dazeley (Danilo), Amy Freston (Valencienne), Allan Clayton/Nicholas Sharratt (Camille), Geoffrey Dolton (Baron Zeta) | Wyn Davies/Andrea Quinn | Giles Havergal | Leslie Travers |
| 2010–11 | **Carmen** | Bizet | Heather Shipp (Carmen), Peter Auty (Don José), Kostas Smoriginas (Escamillo), Anne Sophie Duprels (Micaela) | Andreas Delfs | Daniel Kramer | Soutra Gilmour/Gabrielle Dalton |
| 2010–11 | **From the House of the Dead** | Janáček | Jeffrey Lloyd Roberts (Luka), Roderick Williams (Goryanchikov), Alan Oke (Skuratov), Claire Wild (Alyeya), Mark le Brocq (Shapkin), Robert Hayward (Shishkov) | Richard Farnes | John Fulljames | Dick Bird |
| 2011–12 | **Madama Butterfly** | Puccini | Anne Sophie Duprels (Butterfly), Noah Stewart (Pinkerton), | Wyn Davies/ Martin Pickard | Tim Albery | |
| 2011–12 | **Giulio Cesare** | Handel | Pamela Helen Stephen (Giulio Cesare), Sarah Tynan (Cleopatra), James Laing (Tolomeo) | Robert Howarth | Tim Albery | Leslie Travers |
| 2011–12 | **Norma** | Bellini | Annemarie Kremer (Norma) | Oliver von Dohnányi | Christopher Alden | Charles Edwards |
| 2012–13 | **Don Giovanni** | Mozart | William Dazeley (Don Giovanni) Meeta Raval (Donna Anna) | Tobias Ringborg | Alessandro Talevi | Madeleine Boyd |
| 2012–13 | **Otello** | Verdi | Ronald Samm(Otello) | Richard Farnes | Tim Albery | Leslie Travers |
| 2012–13 | **La clemenza di Tito** | Mozart | Annemarie Kremer (Vitellia) Paul Nilon (Tito) | Richard Farnes | John Fulljames | Leslie Travers |

== Sources ==
- Opera North annual review 2004–2005
- Opera North annual review 2006–2007
- Opera North programmes 2008–11

== See also ==
- Opera North: history and repertoire, seasons 1978–79 to 1980–81
- Opera North: history and repertoire, seasons 1981–82 to 1989–90
- Opera North: history and repertoire, seasons 1990–91 to 1996–97
- Opera North: history and repertoire, seasons 1997–98 to 2003–04
