= Opera North: history and repertoire, seasons 1981–82 to 1989–90 =

Opera company based at the Grand Theatre, Leeds, England

Opera North is an opera company based at the Grand Theatre, Leeds, England. This article covers the period between the severing of its ties with English National Opera and the departure of its founding music director David Lloyd-Jones.

== History ==
During this period, the newly independent company gave the world premiere of Wilfred Josephs's opera Rebecca, based on the novel by Daphne du Maurier and the Alfred Hitchcock film, as well as the British premieres of Ernst Krenek's Jonny spielt auf, Richard Strauss's Daphne and Verdi's Jérusalem, and the British professional premiere of Carl Nielsen's Maskarade. Jerome Kern's Show Boat, a collaboration with the Royal Shakespeare Company, was the first of the company's excursions into American musical theatre. In addition, a number of productions of popular operas which had been borrowed from other companies were replaced by new productions.

Nicholas Payne, formerly of Welsh National Opera, replaced Graham Marchant as General Administrator in 1982, and David Lloyd-Jones's title changed from Music Director to Artistic Director. Guest conductors included Stephen Barlow, Nicholas Cleobury, Wyn Davies, Alan Hacker, Richard Hickox, Graeme Jenkins, Diego Masson, Ali Rahbari, Carlo Rizzi, Yan Pascal Tortelier. Notable singers for the company during the period included Josephine Barstow, Lesley Garrett, Jane Eaglen, Lynne Dawson, Sally Burgess, Wilhelmenia Fernandez (of Diva fame), Valerie Masterson, Pauline Tinsley, Felicity Palmer, William Lewis, John Mitchinson, Anthony Rolfe Johnson, Dennis O'Neill, Malcolm Donnelly, Jonathan Summers, David Wilson-Johnson, Sergei Leiferkus, Anthony Michaels-Moore, John Tomlinson, Philip Joll, Andrew Shore and Willard White.

Graham Vick's first major new opera production was ON's Così fan tutte in 1982. Other well-known directors who worked for the company during this period included Tim Albery, David Alden, John Copley, Anthony Besch, Robert Carsen, Martin Duncan, David Freeman, Peter Gill, Colin Graham, Ian Judge, Richard Jones (whose "scratch and sniff" production of The Love for Three Oranges was subsequently seen in London, the Netherlands and at New York City Opera), Steven Pimlott, Philip Prowse, David Pountney and Andrei Şerban.

As well as performances at Opera North's regular touring venues (Nottingham, Newcastle and Salford), the company took Jonny spielt auf to Sadler's Wells Theatre in 1984–85, Tamerlano to Halle and East Berlin for Handel's tercentenary in 1985, and Aida and The Midsummer Marriage to Wiesbaden in 1985–86.

In 1990, David Lloyd-Jones relinquished the position of Opera North's artistic director. In his twelve years with the company, he conducted 50 different operas by 31 different composers. His successor, Paul Daniel, who had conducted Jérusalem in 1990, took over as Music Director at the start of the 1990–91 season.

== Repertoire ==
Below is a list of main stage operas performed by the company during its early years as an independent entity.

Season	Opera	Composer	Principal cast	Conductor	Director	Designer
1981–82	Carmen	Bizet	Gillian Knight (Carmen), Robert Ferguson (Don José), Michael Lewis (Escamillo), Barbara Walker (Micaela)	John Pryce-Jones	Revival of 1978–79 production	
1981–82	Macbeth	Verdi	John Rawnsley (Macbeth), Elizabeth Vaughan (Lady Macbeth), Anthony Roden (Macduff)	David Lloyd-Jones	Michael Geliot	John Gunter/ Sally Gardner
1981–82	Hänsel und Gretel	Humperdinck	Patricia Parker (Hansel), Laureen Livingstone (Gretel), Patricia Payne (Witch)	Clive Timms	Revival of 1978–79 production by Patrick Libby	
1981–82	Orpheus in the Underworld	Offenbach	John Winfield (Orpheus), Patricia Cope (Euridice), Thomas Lawlor (Jupiter)	John Pryce-Jones /Roy Laughlin	Revival of 1978–79 production	
1981–82	Rigoletto	Verdi	John Rawnsley/Terence Sharpe (Rigoletto), Robert Ferguson (Duke), Helen Field/Hilary Jackson (Gilda)	Robin Stapleton	Revival of 1979–80 production by Patrick Libby	
1981–82	The Bartered Bride	Smetana	Marie Slorach (Mařenka), Arthur Davies (Jeník), Eric Garrett/Thomas Lawlor (Kecal), Justin Lavender (Vašek)	David Lloyd-Jones /Clive Timms	Steven Pimlott	Stefanos Lazaridis
1981–82	A Midsummer Night’s; Dream	Britten	Kevin Smith (Oberon), Nan Christie (Tytania), Stephen Rhys-Williams (Bottom), Ian Caley (Lysander), Barbara Walker (Helena), Fiona Kimm (Hermia), Christopher Booth-Jones (Demetrius)	Elgar Howarth	Ian Watt-Smith	Alexander; McPherson
1981–82	Manon Lescaut	Puccini	Arlene Saunders (Manon), Benito Maresca (Des Grieux), Christian du Plessis (Lescaut)	David Lloyd-Jones	Christopher; Renshaw	Bruno Santini
1981–82	Nabucco	Verdi	Pauline Tinsley (Abigaille), Norman Bailey (Nabucco), John Tranter (Zaccaria)	Clive Timms	Revival of 1979–80 production	
1981–82	Così fan tutte	Mozart	Eiddwen Harrhy (Fiordiligi), Patricia Parker (Dorabella), Robin Leggate (Ferrando), Robert Dean (Guglielmo), Kate Flowers (Despina), Rodney Macann (Don Alfonso)	David Lloyd-Jones	Graham Vick	Russell Craig
1981–82	Werther	Massenet	John Brecknock (Werther), Carol Wyatt (Charlotte), Lesley Garrett (Sophie)	Clive Timms	Steven Pimlott	Maria Björnson
1981–82	The Flying Dutchman	Wagner	Malcolm Donnelly, Anne Evans, John Tranter	Friedrich Pleyer	Revival of 1978–79 production	
1982–83	Prince Igor	Borodin	Malcolm Donnelly (Igor), Margaret Curphey (Yaroslavna), Tom McDonnell (Galitsky), Roderick Kennedy (Khan Konchak)	David Lloyd-Jones	Steven Pimlott	Stefanos Lazaridis
1982–83	The Marriage of Figaro	Mozart	William Shimell (Figaro), Lesley Garrett (Susanna), Stephen Roberts (Count), Margaret Neville (Countess), Elise Ross (Cherubino)	Richard Hickox	Revival of 1978–79 production by Patrick Libby	
1982–83	Samson et Dalila	Saint-Saëns	Gilbert Py (Samson), Ann Howard (Dalila), Jonathan Summers (High Priest)	Clive Timms	Revival of 1978–79 production by Patrick Libby	
1982–83	Madama Butterfly	Puccini	Elizabeth Vaughan (Butterfly), Kristian Johannsson (Pinkerton), Terence Sharpe (Sharpless), Maureen Morelle (Suzuki)	David Lloyd-Jones	John Copley	Robin Don
1982–83	La Cenerentola	Rossini	Della Jones (Cenerentola), John Brecknock/Richard Morton (Don Ramiro), ??? (Don Magnifico), Stuart Harling (Dandini), Rodney Macann (Alidoro)	Guido; Amojne-Marsan /Roy Laughlin	Colin Graham	Roger Butlin
1982–83	The Tales of Hoffmann	Offenbach	David Hillman (Hoffmann), Suzanne Murphy (Olympia, Antonia, Giulietta, Stella), Raimund Herincx (Lindorf, Coppelius, Dr Miracle, Dapertutto)	Clive Timms	Revival of 1980–81 production	
1982–83	La bohème	Puccini	William Livingston (Rodolfo), Anne Williams-King (Mimi), William Shimell (Marcello), Maria Moll (Musetta)	David Lloyd-Jones	Revival of 1978–79 production	
1982–83	Don Giovanni	Mozart	Christian du Plessis (Don Giovanni), Suzanne Murphy (Donna Anna), Eiddwen Harrhy (Donna Elvira), Roderick Earle (Leporello), Ian Thompson (Don Ottavio)	Clive Timms	Andrew Wickes	Maria Bjornson
1982–83	Káťa Kabanová	Janáček	Marie Slorach (Katya), Keith Mills (Boris), Bonaventura Bottone (Kudryash), Barbara Walker (Varvara), Judith Pierce (Kabanicha)	David Lloyd-Jones	Graham Vick	Stefanos Lazaridis
1982–83	Béatrice et Bénédict	Berlioz	Claire Powell (Beatrice), John Brecknock (Benedict), Eilene Hannan (Hero)	David Lloyd-Jones	David Alden	David Fielding
1982–83	L'elisir d'amore	Donizetti	Gillian Sullivan (Adina), Alexander Oliver/Bonaventura Bottone (Nemorino), Michael Rippon (Dulcamara), Gordon Sandison (Belcore)	John Pryce-Jones	Revival of 1980–81 production	
1982–83	Der Freischütz	Weber	John Mitchinson (Max), Margaret Curphey (Agathe), Malcolm Rivers (Caspar), Kate Flowers (Aennchen)	Clive Timms	Revival of 1980–81 production	
1983–84	Die Fledermaus	J Strauss	Jonny Blanc (Eisenstein), Penelope Mackay (Rosalinda), Lynda Russell (Adele), Adrian Martin/Bonaventura Bottone (Alfredo)	Clive Timms	Hans Hollman	John Gunter/ Sue Blane
1983–84	Così fan tutte	Mozart	Marie Slorach (Fiordiligi), Cynthia Buchan (Dorabella), John Graham-Hall (Ferrando), Robert Dean/Geoffrey Dolton (Guglielmo), Elizabeth Gale (Despina), Rodney Macann (Don Alfonso)	John Pryce-Jones	Revival of 1981–82 production	
1983–84	Rebecca (world premiere)	Josephs	Gillian Sullivan (The second Mrs de Winter), Peter Knapp (Maxim de Winter), Ann Howard (Mrs Danvers)	David Lloyd-Jones	Colin Graham	Stefanos Lazaridis
1983–84	Il trovatore	Verdi	Natalia Rom (Leonora), Eduardo Alvares (Manrico), Cynthia Buchan (Azucena), James Dietsch (Count di Luna)	Yan Pascal; Tortelier	Andrei Şerban	Michael Yeargan
1983–84	Eugene Onegin	Tchaikovsky	Eilene Hannan (Tatyana), Jonathan Summers (Onegin), Robin Leggate (Lensky), Fiona Kimm (Olga)	David Lloyd-Jones	Graham Vick	Roger Butlin
1983–84	The Cunning Little Vixen	Janáček	Helen Field (Vixen), Willard White (Forester), Gordon Christie (Fox), Neil Jenkins (Schoolmaster), Thomas Lawlor (Priest)	Wyn Davies	David Pountney	Maria Björnson
1983–84	Orfeo ed Euridice	Gluck	Felicity Palmer (Orfeo), Patricia Rozario (Euridice), Cathryn Pope (Amor)	David Lloyd-Jones	Philip Prowse	Philip Prowse
1983–84	Tosca	Puccini	Valerie Popova (Tosca), Kristian Johannsson (Cavaradossi), Brent Ellis (Scarpia)	John Pryce-Jones	Andrew Wickes	
1983–84	The Bartered Bride	Smetana	Eiddwen Harrhy (Mařenka), Laurence Dale (Jeník), Thomas Lawlor (Kecal), Mark Curtis (Vašek)	Clive Timms	Revival of 1981–82 production	
1983–84	Salome	R Strauss	Penelope Daner (Salome), Philip Joll (Jokanaan), Nigel Douglas (Herod), Della Jones (Herodias)	David Lloyd-Jones	Joachim Herz	Rudolf Heinrich
1983–84	A Village Romeo and Juliet	Delius	Peter Jeffes (Sali), Anne Williams-King (Vrenchen), David Wilson-Johnson (The Dark Fiddler)	Nicholas Cleobury	Robert Carsen	Russell Craig/ John Fraser
1983–84	Madama Butterfly	Puccini	Mani Mekler (Butterfly), Franco Farina (Pinkerton), Rodney Macann (Sharpless), Anne Mason (Suzuki)	Clive Timms	Revival of 1982–83 production	
1983–84	The Threepenny Opera	Weill	Peter Savidge (Macheath), Beverley Mills (Polly), Eiddwen Harrhy (Jenny Diver), Mark Lufton (Peachum), Clare Moll (Mrs Peachum)	John Pryce-Jones	Philip Prowse	Philip Prowse
1984–85	Cavalleria rusticana	Mascagni	Phyllis Cannan/Jane Eaglen (Santuzza), Frederick Donaldson (Turiddu)	David Lloyd-Jones /Clive Timms	Steven Pimlott	Raimonda Gaetani
1984–85	Pagliacci	Leoncavallo	Angelo Marengi (Canio), Kate Flowers (Nedda), Florian Cerny (Tonio)	David Lloyd-Jones /Clive Timms	Steven Pimlott	Raimonda Gaetani
1984–85	Nabucco	Verdi	Elizabeth Vaughan (Abigaille), Jonathan Summers (Nabucco), Giovanni Gusmeroli (Zaccaria)	Elgar Howarth/ John Pryce-Jones	Revival of 1979–80 production	
1984–85	Jonny spielt auf (British premiere)	Krenek	Jonathan Sprague (Jonny), Kenneth Woollam (Max), Penelope Mackay (Anita), Gillian Sullivan (Anita)	David Lloyd-Jones	Anthony Besch	John Stoddart
1984–85	The Magic Flute	Mozart	Laurence Dale (Tamino), Jane Leslie Mackenzie (Pamina), Alan Watt (Papageno), Geoffrey Moses (Sarastro), Evelyn Nicholson (Queen of the Night)	Peter Hirsch	Graham Vick	Russell Craig
1984–85	The Gondoliers	Sullivan	Beverley Mills/Louise Winter (Tessa), Gordon Christie (Marco), Peter Savidge (Giuseppe), Gillian Sullivan (Gianetta)	David Lloyd-Jones /Anthony Shelley	Christopher; Renshaw	Tim Goodchild
1984–85	The Threepenny Opera	Weill	Peter Savidge (Macheath), Beverley Mills (Polly), Eiddwen Harrhy (Jenny Diver), Mark Lufton (Peachum), Clare Moll (Mrs Peachum)	John Pryce-Jones	Revival of 1983–84 production	
1984–85	La traviata	Verdi	Helen Field/Natalia Rom (Violetta), Adrian Martin (Alfredo), Jonathan Summers (Germont)	Roderick Brydon	François Rochaix	Jean-Claude Maret
1984–85	Tamerlano	Handel	Felicity Palmer (Tamburlaine), Richard Morton (Bajazet), Sally Burgess (Andronicus), Eiddwen Harrhy (Asteria), Wendy Vercoe (Irene)	Clive Timms	Philip Prowse	Philip Prowse
1984–85	Die Meistersinger von Nürnberg	Wagner	Michael Burt (Sachs), Denes Striny (Walther), Nicholas Folwell (Beckmesser) Marie Slorach (Eva), Bonaventura Bottone (David), John Tranter (Pogner)	David Lloyd-Jones /Clive Timms	Ladislav Stros	Vladímir Nyvlt/ Josef Jelínek
1984–85	Il trovatore	Verdi	Wilhelmenia Fernandez (Leonora), Gordon Greer (Manrico), Patricia Payne (Azucena), Keith Latham (Count di Luna)	John Pryce-Jones	Revival of 1983–84 production	
1984–85	Werther	Massenet	Tibère Raffalli (Werther), Cynthia Buchan (Charlotte), Patricia Rozario (Sophie)	Yan Pascal; Tortelier	Revival of 1981–82 production	
1985–86	I puritani	Bellini	Dennis O'Neill (Arturo), Suzanne Murphy (Elvira), Donald Maxwell (Riccardo), Roderick Earle (Giorgio)	Clive Timms	Andrei Şerban	Michael Yeargan
1985–86	The Magic Flute	Mozart	Richard Morton (Tamino), Jane Leslie Mackenzie (Pamina), Henry Newman (Papageno), Stephen Richardson (Sarastro), Evelyn Nicholson (Queen of the Night)	Martin; Fischer-Dieskau	Revival of 1984–85 production	
1985–86	The Midsummer; Marriage	Tippett	Rita Cullis (Jenifer), Donald Stephenson (Mark), Peter Jeffes (Jack), Patricia O’Neill (Bella), Philip Joll (King Fisher), Penelope Walker (Sosostris)	David Lloyd-Jones	Tim Albery	Tom Cairns/ Antony McDonald
1985–86	La fanciulla del West	Puccini	Mary Jane Johnson (Minnie), John Treleaven (Dick Johnson), Malcolm Donnelly (Jack Rance)	David Lloyd-Jones	David Pountney	Günther Schneider-Siemssen
1985–86	The Golden Cockerel	Rimsky- Korsakov	Andrew Shore (King Dodon), Elizabeth Gale (Queen of Shemakha), Justin Lavender (Astrologer), Bronwen Mills (Cockerel)	Alexander Rahbari	David Pountney	Maria Björnson/ Sue Blane
1985–86	La traviata	Verdi	Natalia Rom/Helen Field (Violetta), Adrian Martin (Alfredo), Donald Maxwell (Germont)	John Pryce-Jones	Revival of 1984–85 production	
1985–86	The Mikado	Sullivan	Harry Nicoll (Nanki-Poo), Kate Flowers (Yum-Yum), Alan Oke (Ko-Ko), Thomas Lawlor (Pooh-Bah), John Tranter (The Mikado)	Clive Timms	Christopher; Renshaw	Tim Goodchild
1985–86	Aida	Verdi	Wilhelminia Fernandez/Maria Abajan (Aida), Frederick Donaldson/Seppo Ruohonen (Radames), Sally Burgess/Linda Finnie (Amneris), Keith Latham (Amonasro)	David Lloyd-Jones; John Pryce-Jones	Philip Prowse	Philip Prowse
1985–86	Intermezzo	R Strauss	Peter Savidge (Robert Storch), Rita Cullis (Christine), Harry Nicoll (Baron Lummer)	Stephen Barlow	John Cox	Martin Battersby
1985–86	The Rake's Progress	Stravinsky	Anthony Rolfe Johnson (Tom Rakewell), William Shimmell (Nick Shadow), Jane Leslie Mackenzie (Ann Trulove)	Roderick Brydon	François Rochaix	Jean-Claude Maret
1985–86	Faust	Gounod	Jerome Pruett (Faust), Valerie Masterson (Marguerite), John Tomlinson (Méphistophélès), Keith Latham (Valentin)	Clive Timms	Ian Judge	John Gunter/ Deidre Clancy
1985–86	Don Giovanni	Mozart	Peter Savidge (Don Giovanni), Christine Teare (Donna Anna), Kathryn Harries (Donna Elvira), Nicholas Folwell (Leporello), Glenn Winslade (Don Ottavio) Linda Kitchen (Zerlina)	David Lloyd-Jones	Tim Albery	Maria Björnson/ Antony McDonald
1986–87	Les Troyens (part 1: The Capture of Troy)	Berlioz	Kristine Ciesinski (Cassandra), Ronald Hamilton (Aeneas), Richard Salter (Chorebus)	David Lloyd-Jones	Tim Albery	Antony McDonald /Tom Cairns
1986–87	Madama Butterfly	Puccini	Natalia Rom (Butterfly), Arthur Davies/Frederick Donaldson (Pinkerton), Keith Latham (Sharpless), Claire Primrose (Suzuki)	Rico Saccani	Sally Day	Robin Don
1986–87	The Barber of Seville	Rossini	Peter Savidge (Figaro), Beverley Mills (Rosina), Harry Nicoll (Almaviva), David Wilson-Johnson (Dr Bartolo)	Clive Timms	Giles Havergal	Russell Craig
1986–87	La bohème	Puccini	Adrian Martin (Rodolfo), Eirian Davies/Lynne Dawson (Mimi), William Shimmell/Anthony Michaels-Moore (Marcello), Anna Steiger/Roisin McGibbon (Musetta)	Elgar Howarth/ Clive Timms	David Freeman	David Roger
1986–87	Norma	Bellini	Monica Pick-Hieronimi (Norma), Eiddwen Harrhy (Adalgisa), Frederick Donaldson (Pollione)	Clive Timms	Andrei Şerban	Michael Yeargan
1986–87	Oedipus rex	Stravinsky	Anthony Roden (Oedipus), Della Jones (Jocasta), Keith Latham (Creon), John Tranter (Tiresias)	David Lloyd-Jones	Revival of 1980–81 production	
1986–87	Die Entführung aus dem Serail	Mozart	Sally Wolf (Konstanze), Laurence Dale/Jerome Pruett (Belmonte), Tom Haenan (Osmin), Elizabeth Gale/Bronwen Mills (Blonde), Bonaventura Bottone (Pedrillo)	Tomasz Bugaj	Graham Vick	Kevin Rupnik
1986–87	La traviata	Verdi	Sheri Greenawald (Violetta), Jerome Pruett/Patrick Power, Keith Latham (Germont)	John Pryce-Jones	Revival of 1984–85 production	
1986–87	Daphne (British premiere)	R Strauss	Helen Field (Daphne), William Lewis (Apollo), Peter Jeffes (Leukippos)	David Lloyd-Jones	Philip Prowse	Philip Prowse
1987–88	Les Troyens (part 2: The Trojans at Carthage)	Berlioz	Sally Burgess (Dido), William Lewis (Aeneas), Patricia Bardon (Anna)	David Lloyd-Jones	Tim Albery	Tom Cairns/ Antony McDonald
1987–88	The Marriage of Figaro	Mozart	Robert Hayward (Figaro), Helen Field (Susanna), Peter Savidge (Count), Iva-Maria Turri (Countess), Beverley Mills (Cherubino)	Stephen Barlow	Peter Gill	Alison Chitty
1987–88	Macbeth	Verdi	Brent Ellis/Keith Latham (Macbeth), Josephine Barstow (Lady Macbeth)	John Pryce-Jones	Ian Judge	John Gunter/ Deidre Clancy
1987–88	Carmen	Bizet	Cynthia Buchan (Carmen), Dennis O’Neill/Edmund Barham/Arthur Davies (Don José), Anthony Michaels-Moore/Donald Maxwell (Escamillo), Marie Slorach (Micaela)	Alexander Rahbari /Clive Timms /Anthony Jenner	Richard Jones	Nigel Lowery
1987–88	Rebecca	Josephs	Anne Williams-King (The second Mrs de Winter), Peter Knapp (Maxim de Winter), Ann Howard (Mrs Danvers)	David Lloyd-Jones	Revival of 1983–84 production	
1987–88	The Merry Widow	Lehár	Kathryn Harries/Vivian Tierney (Hanna Glawari), Peter Savidge (Danilo), Andrea Bolton (Valencienne), Paul Nilon (Camille), Thomas Lawlor (Baron Zeta)	Clive Timms	Revival of 1979–80 production	
1987–88	Káťa Kabanová	Janáček	Eiddwen Harrhy (Katya), Edmund Barham (Boris), Paul Nilon (Kudryash), Louise Winter (Varvara), Catherine Wilson (Kabanicha)	Elgar Howarth	Revival of 1982–83 production	
1987–88	Tosca	Puccini	Mary Jane Johnson/Valerie Popova (Tosca), John Treleaven (Cavaradossi), Sergei Leiferkus (Scarpia)	Clive Timms	Ian Judge	Gerard Howland/ Ann Curtis
1987–88	Fidelio	Beethoven	Janice Cairns (Leonore), Jeffrey Lawton (Florestan), Donald Maxwell (Pizarro), Mark Munkittrick (Rocco)	David Lloyd-Jones /Roy Laughlin	Michael; McCarthy	Peter Mumford
1988–89	The Love for Three Oranges	Prokofiev	Peter Jeffes (The Prince), Paul Harrhy (Truffaldino), Andrew Shore/Robert Poulton (Leander), Pauline Tinsley (Fata Morgana)	David Lloyd-Jones	Richard Jones	The Brothers Quay /Sue Blane
1988–89	Lucia di Lammermoor	Donizetti	Valerie Masterson (Lucia), Jorge Pita/Ingus Peterson (Edgardo), Keith Latham (Enrico)	Clive Timms	David Gann	Ultz/ Stephen Rodwell
1988–89	La bohème	Puccini	Adrian Martin (Rodolfo), Joan Rodgers (Mimi), Peter Savidge (Marcello), Marie Angel (Musetta)	Diego Masson	Revival of 1986–87 production	
1988–89	Les pêcheurs de perles	Bizet	Arthur Davies/Adrian Martin (Nadir), Sergei Leiferkus/Keith Latham (Zurga), Anne Dawson (Leila)	David Lloyd-Jones	Philip Prowse/ Sally Day	Philip Prowse
1988–89	Aida	Verdi	Janice Cairns (Aida), John Treleaven (Radames), Sally Burgess (Amneris), Keith Latham (Amonasro)	Clive Timms	Revival of 1985–86 production	
1988–89	The Flying Dutchman	Wagner	Donald Maxwell (The Dutchman), Kristine Ciesinski (Senta), David Gwynne (Daland), Jeffrey Lawton (Erik)	Jacek Kaspszyk	Stephen Medcalf	Lez Brotherston
1988–89	The Marriage of Figaro	Mozart	Anthony Michaels-Moore (Figaro), Judith Howarth (Susanna), Peter Savidge/Geoffrey Dolton (Count), Ida-Maria Turri (Countess), Linda Kitchen (Cherubino)	Elgar Howarth	Revival of 1987–78 production	
1988–89	Manon	Massenet	Helen Field (Manon), Patrick Power (Des Grieux), Lescaut (Geoffrey Dolton)	Clive Timms	Richard Jones	Richard Hudson
1988–89	Boris Godunov	Mussorgsky	John Tomlinson (Boris), Edmund Barham (Grigory), Kim Begley (Shuisky), Sean Rea (Pimen)	David Lloyd-Jones	Ian Judge	Russell Craig/ Deidre Clancy
1989–90	Peter Grimes	Britten	John Treleaven (Peter Grimes), Marie Slorach (Ellen Orford), Malcolm Donnelly (Balstrode)	David Lloyd-Jones /Roy Laughlin	Ronald Eyre	Mark Thompson
1989–90	Tosca	Puccini	Mary Jane Johnson/Edith Davis/Janice Cairns (Tosca), Edmund Barham (Cavaradossi), Donald Maxwell/Keith Latham (Scarpia)	Carlo Rizzi	Revival of 1987–78 production	
1989–90	La finta giardiniera	Mozart	Anne Dawson (Sandrina), Paul Nilon (Belfiore), Nigel Robson (Podestà), Peter Savidge (Nardo), Linda Kitchen (Serpetta) Katherine Steffan (Ramiro)	Alan Hacker	Tim Albery	Tom Cairns
1989–90	Show Boat	Kern	Linda Kitchen (Magnolia), Peter Savidge (Ravenal), Sally Burgess (Julie), Karla Burns/Ellia English (Queenie), Bruce Hubbard/José Garcia (Joe), Trevor Peacock (Cap’n Andy), Dilys Laye (Parthy)	Graeme Jenkins /Wyn Davies	Ian Judge	Russell Craig/ Alexander Reid
1989–90	The Barber of Seville	Rossini	Russell Smythe (Figaro), Clare Shearer (Rosina), Neill Archer (Almaviva), Andrew Shore (Dr Bartolo)	Marco Guidarini	Revival of 1986–87 production	
1989–90	Don Pasquale	Donizetti	Andrew Shore/Roger Bryson (Pasquale), Adrian Martin (Ernesto), Juliet Booth/Judith Howarth (Norina), Robert Hayward (Malatesta)	David Lloyd-Jones /Hilary Griffiths	Patrick Mason	Joe Vaněk
1989–90	Jérusalem (British premiere)	Verdi	Arthur Davies (Gaston), José Garcia (Roger), Janice Cairns (Hélène), Keith Latham (Count of Toulouse)	Paul Daniel/ Roy Laughlin	Pierre Audi	Michael Simon/ Jorge Jara
1989–90	L'heure espagnole	Ravel	Louise Winter (Concepción), Jason Howard (Ramiro), Harry Nicoll (Gonzalve), Andrew Shore (Don Inigo Gomez)	David Lloyd-Jones	Martin Duncan	Tom Cairns
1989–90	Gianni Schicchi	Puccini	Andrew Shore (Schicchi), David Maxwell-Anderson (Rinuccio), Juliet Booth (Lauretta)	David Lloyd-Jones	Martin Duncan	Tom Cairns
1989–90	Orfeo ed Euridice	Gluck	Sally Burgess (Orfeo), Jane-Leslie Mackenzie (Euridice), Claire Daniels (Amor)	Clive Timms	Revival of 1983–84 production	
1989–90	Maskarade (British professional premiere)	Nielsen	Paul Nilon (Leander), Mary Hegarty (Leonora), Geoffrey Dolton (Henrik), Meriel Dickinson (Magdelone), Clive Bayley (Jeronimus)	Elgar Howarth	Helena; Kaut-Howson	Lez Brotherston

== Sources ==
- Leeks, Stuart, ed. (2003). Opera North @ 25. Leeds: Opera North.

== See also ==
- Opera North: history and repertoire, seasons 1978–79 to 1980–81
- Opera North: history and repertoire, seasons 1990–91 to 1996–97
- Opera North: history and repertoire, seasons 1997–98 to 2003–04
- Opera North: history and repertoire, seasons 2004–05 to present
