= Opera North: history and repertoire, seasons 1978–79 to 1980–81 =

Opera North is an opera company based at The Grand Theatre, Leeds, England. This article covers its establishment and early years.

== History ==
On 10 March 1976, at a reception at Harewood House, a plan to make the Grand Theatre a northern home for English National Opera (ENO) was unveiled. The Arts Council of Great Britain was prepared to back the scheme, provided that the local authorities in the area would also contribute funding. With Leeds City Council in the lead, sufficient funds were forthcoming, although there was some slippage in the proposed timetable. English National Opera North (ENON) was established in late 1977, with Lord Harewood as Managing Director and Graham Marchant as General Administrator. Its first performance (of Saint-Saëns's Samson et Dalila) was given on 15 November 1978. The opera was conducted by the founding Music Director of the company, David Lloyd-Jones.

In the inaugural 1978–79 season, 11 operas were performed. Six were new productions, four of them directed by Patrick Libby, ENON's Director of Productions. The remaining five productions comprised one from Scottish Opera (Colin Graham's Peter Grimes) and four from ENO. Before the end of the season, the company toured The Marriage of Figaro to Barnsley, Scarborough and Darlington.

the 1979–80 season saw two more Libby productions (one of them the rarely performed A Village Romeo and Juliet by Frederick Delius who was born in Bradford), six, including Richard Rodney Bennett's The Mines of Sulphur, borrowed from ENO, one revival from 1978 to 1979, Wendy Toye's new The Merry Widow and Steven Pimlott's spectacular new Nabucco. Libby's Rigoletto was played in a tent in Sheffield as well as at the company's regular venues in Newcastle, Salford and Nottingham.

Most productions during this period were conducted by Lloyd-Jones. Clive Timms, Opera North's Head of Music, and John Pryce-Jones, Chorus Master, also conducted, with Elgar Howarth, Gabriele Bellini and David Parry as guest conductors. A stalwart of ENO, Robert Ferguson, sang many of the leading tenor roles, frequently with John Rawnsley and/or Stuart Harling (baritones) and John Tranter (bass). Guest singers included Josephine Veasey, Ann Murray, Elizabeth Harwood, Della Jones, Elizabeth Vaughan, Joan Carden, Felicity Palmer, Graham Clark, David Hillman, Peter Glossop, Forbes Robinson, Derek Hammond-Stroud and Norman Bailey. Another special guest, in the non-singing role of Frosch in Die Fledermaus, was Clive Dunn of Dad's Army fame.

As well as performing during this period at its regular venues, the company also visited Dortmund (with Peter Grimes), Glasgow (with Nabucco and Carmen) and Buxton.

At the end of the 1981–82 season, English National Opera North changed its name to Opera North and became an independent entity.

== Repertoire ==
Below is a list of main stage operas performed by the company during the period when it was known as English National Opera North.

| Season | Opera | Composer | Principal cast | Conductor | Director | Designer |
|---|---|---|---|---|---|---|
| 1978–79 | Samson et Dalila | Saint-Saëns | Gilbert Py (Samson), Katherine Pring (Dalila), John Rawnsley (High Priest) | David Lloyd-Jones | Patrick Libby | John Stoddart |
| 1978–79 | Les mamelles de Tirésias | Poulenc | Joy Roberts (Thérèse), Stuart Harling (The Husband) | Clive Timms | John Copley | Robin Don |
| 1978–79 | Dido and Aeneas | Purcell | Ann Murray (Dido), Sandra Dugdale (Belinda), Ian Caddy (Aeneas) | Clive Timms | Ian Watt‑Smith | Alexander McPherson |
| 1978–79 | La bohème | Puccini | Robert Ferguson (Rodolfo), Eileen Hannan (Mimi), John Rawnsley (Marcello), Margaret Haggart (Musetta) | David Lloyd‑Jones/ Clive Timms | Patrick Libby | Margaret Harris |
| 1978–79 | Orpheus in the Underworld | Offenbach | Peter Jeffes (Orpheus), Sandra Dugdale (Euridice), Eric Shilling/Thomas Lawlor (Jupiter), Bonaventura Bottone (John Styx) | Clive Timms | Wendy Toye | Malcolm Pride |
| 1978–79 | The Magic Flute | Mozart | Robert Ferguson (Tamino), Eiddwen Harrhy (Pamina), Stuart Harling (Papageno), Don Garrard/John Tranter (Sarastro), Margaret Haggart/Iris Saunders (Queen of the Night) | David Lloyd-Jones | Anthony Besch | John Stoddart |
| 1978–79 | Hänsel und Gretel | Humperdinck | Claire Powell (Hansel), Elizabeth Gale (Gretel), Ann Howard (Witch) | David Lloyd-Jones | Patrick Libby | Adam Pollock |
| 1978–79 | Die Fledermaus | J Strauss | Nigel Douglas (Eisenstein), Sheila Armstrong (Rosalinda), Joy Roberts (Adele), Ramon Remedios (Alfredo) | David Parry | Patrick Libby | Jane Kingshill |
| 1978–79 | Peter Grimes | Britten | Robert Ferguson (Grimes), Ava June (Ellen Orford), Geoffrey Chard (Balstrode) | David Lloyd-Jones | Colin Graham | Alix Stone |
| 1978–79 | The Marriage of Figaro | Mozart | Paul Hudson (Figaro), Joy Roberts (Susanna), Stuart Harling (Count), Eiddwen Harrhy (Countess), Marie McLaughlin (Cherubino) | David Lloyd-Jones/ John Pryce-Jones | Patrick Libby | Robin Don |
| 1978–79 | La traviata | Verdi | Lois McDonall (Violetta), Ryland Davies (Alfredo), Christian du Plessis (Germont) | Clive Timms | John Copley | David Walker |
| 1979–80 | Rigoletto | Verdi | John Rawnsley/Michael Lewis (Rigoletto), Michael Renier/Robert Ferguson (Duke), Joy Roberts/Margaret Neville (Gilda) | John Pryce-Jones/ Clive Timms | Patrick Libby | Maria Björnson |
| 1979–80 | Tosca | Puccini | Elizabeth Vaughan (Tosca), Kenneth Collins (Cavaradossi), Geoffrey Chard (Scarpia) | David Lloyd-Jones | Steven Pimlott | Margaret Harris |
| 1979–80 | The Flying Dutchman | Wagner | Peter Glossop (The Dutchman), Arlene Saunders (Senta), Paul Hudson (Daland), Robert Ferguson (Erik) | David Lloyd-Jones | Basil Coleman | Robin Don |
| 1979–80 | The Merry Widow | Lehár | Elizabeth Harwood (Hanna Glawari), David Hillman (Danilo), Bente Marcussen (Valencienne), Adrian Martin (Camille), Thomas Lawlor (Baron Zeta) | David Lloyd-Jones/ John Pryce-Jones | Wendy Toye | Bob Ringwood |
| 1979–80 | Hänsel und Gretel | Humperdinck | Fiona Kimm (Hansel), Kate Flowers (Gretel), Ann Howard (Witch) | David Parry | Revival of 1978–79 production | |
| 1979–80 | Carmen | Bizet | Gillian Knight/Ann Howard (Carmen), Robert Ferguson (Don José), Michael Lewis (Escamillo), Joy Roberts (Micaela) | Clive Timms | John Copley | Stefanos Lazaridis |
| 1979–80 | Der Rosenkavalier | R Strauss | Lois McDonall (The Marschallin), Eiddwen Harrhy (Octavian), Laureen Livingstone (Sophie), Dennis Wicks (Baron Ochs) | David Lloyd-Jones | John Copley | David Walker |
| 1979–80 | The Mines of Sulphur | Bennett | Fiona Kimm (Rosalind), Robert Ferguson (Bocconnion, Eric Garrett (Sherrin), Sally Burgess (Jenny), John Fryatt (Trim) | Clive Timms | Colin Graham | Alix Stone |
| 1979–80 | Nabucco | Verdi | Ludmilla Andrew (Abigaille), Camillo Meghor (Nabucco), John Tranter (Zaccaria) | Elgar Howarth | Steven Pimlott | Stefanos Lazaridis |
| 1979–80 | A Village Romeo and Juliet | Delius | Adrian Martin (Sali), Laureen Livingstone (Vrenchen), Stuart Harling (The Dark Fiddler) | David Lloyd-Jones | Patrick Libby | John Fraser |
| 1979–80 | Le Comte Ory | Rossini | Graham Clark (Count Ory), Eiddwen Harrhy (Countess Adèle), Della Jones (Isolier), Russell Smythe (Raimbaud), Paul Hudson (Ory's Tutor) | David Lloyd-Jones | Anthony Besch | Peter Rice |
| 1980–81 | Jenůfa | Janáček | Lorna Haywood (Jenůfa), Margaret Kingsley (Kostelnička), Robert Ferguson (Laca), Philip Mills (Števa) | David Lloyd-Jones | David Pountney | Maria Björnson |
| 1980–81 | L'elisir d'amore | Donizetti | Lillian Watson (Adina), Ryland Davies (Nemorino), Forbes Robinson (Dulcamara), Richard Jackson (Belcore) | Clive Timms | Michael Geliot | Michael Beaven |
| 1980–81 | La traviata | Verdi | Elizabeth Vaughan (Violetta), Franco Bonanome (Alfredo), Michael Lewis (Germont) | Gabrielle Bellini | Revival of 1978–79 production | |
| 1980–81 | The Merry Widow | Lehár | Elizabeth Robson (Hanna Glawari), Christopher Booth-Jones (Danilo), Eirian James (Valencienne), Arthur Davies (Camille), Thomas Lawlor (Baron Zeta) | David Lloyd-Jones | Revival of 1979–80 production | |
| 1980–81 | The Tales of Hoffmann | Offenbach | David Hillman (Hoffmann), Joan Carden (Olympia, Antonia, Giulietta, Stella), Norman Bailey (Lindorf, Coppelius, Dr Miracle, Dapertutto) | David Lloyd-Jones | Anthony Besch | John Stoddart |
| 1980–81 | La bohème | Puccini | Robert Ferguson (Rodolfo), Sally Burgess (Mimi), Terence Sharpe (Marcello), Bente Marcussen (Musetta) | Clive Timms | Revival of 1978–79 production | |
| 1980–81 | Oedipus rex | Stravinsky | Robert Ferguson (Oedipus), Josephine Veasey (Jocasta), Hugh-Nigel Sheehan (Creon), John Tranter (Tiresias) | David Lloyd-Jones | Patrick Libby | Stefanos Lazaridis |
| 1980–81 | Les mamelles de Tirésias | Poulenc | Kate Flowers (Thérèse), Stuart Harling (The Husband) | Clive Timms | Revival of 1978–79 production | |
| 1980–81 | Tosca | Puccini | Elizabeth Vaughan (Tosca), Kenneth Collins (Cavaradossi), Geoffrey Chard (Scarpia) | David Lloyd-Jones | Revival of 1979–80 production | |
| 1980–81 | The Magic Flute | Mozart | Adrian Martin (Tamino), Helen Walker (Pamina), Michael Lewis (Papageno), John Tranter (Sarastro), Margaret Haggart (Queen of the Night) | David Lloyd-Jones | Revival of 1978–79 production | |
| 1980–81 | Don Giovanni | Mozart | Tom McDonnell (Don Giovanni), Elizabeth Robson (Donna Anna), Felicity Palmer (Donna Elvira), Michael Rippon (Leporello), Robin Leggate (Don Ottavio) | David Lloyd-Jones | David Pountney | Maria Björnson |
| 1980–81 | The Barber of Seville | Rossini | Michael Lewis (Figaro), Della Jones (Rosina), John Brecknock (Almaviva), Derek Hammond-Stroud (Dr Bartolo) | John Pryce-Jones | Patrick Libby | Frances Tempest/ Steve Addison |
| 1980–81 | Der Freischütz | Weber | Robert Ferguson (Max), Sally Burgess/Bente Marcussen (Agathe), Malcolm Rivers (Caspar), Sandra Dugdale (Aennchen) | Clive Timms | Steven Pimlott | John Fraser |

== Sources ==
- Leeks, Stuart, ed. (2003). Opera North @ 25. Leeds: Opera North.

== See also ==
- Opera North: history and repertoire, seasons 1981–82 to 1989–90
- Opera North: history and repertoire, seasons 1990–91 to 1996–97
- Opera North: history and repertoire, seasons 1997–98 to 2003–04
- Opera North: history and repertoire, seasons 2004–05 to present
