= Under Milk Wood: An Opera =

2015 opera by John Metcalf

- Opera by John Metcalf
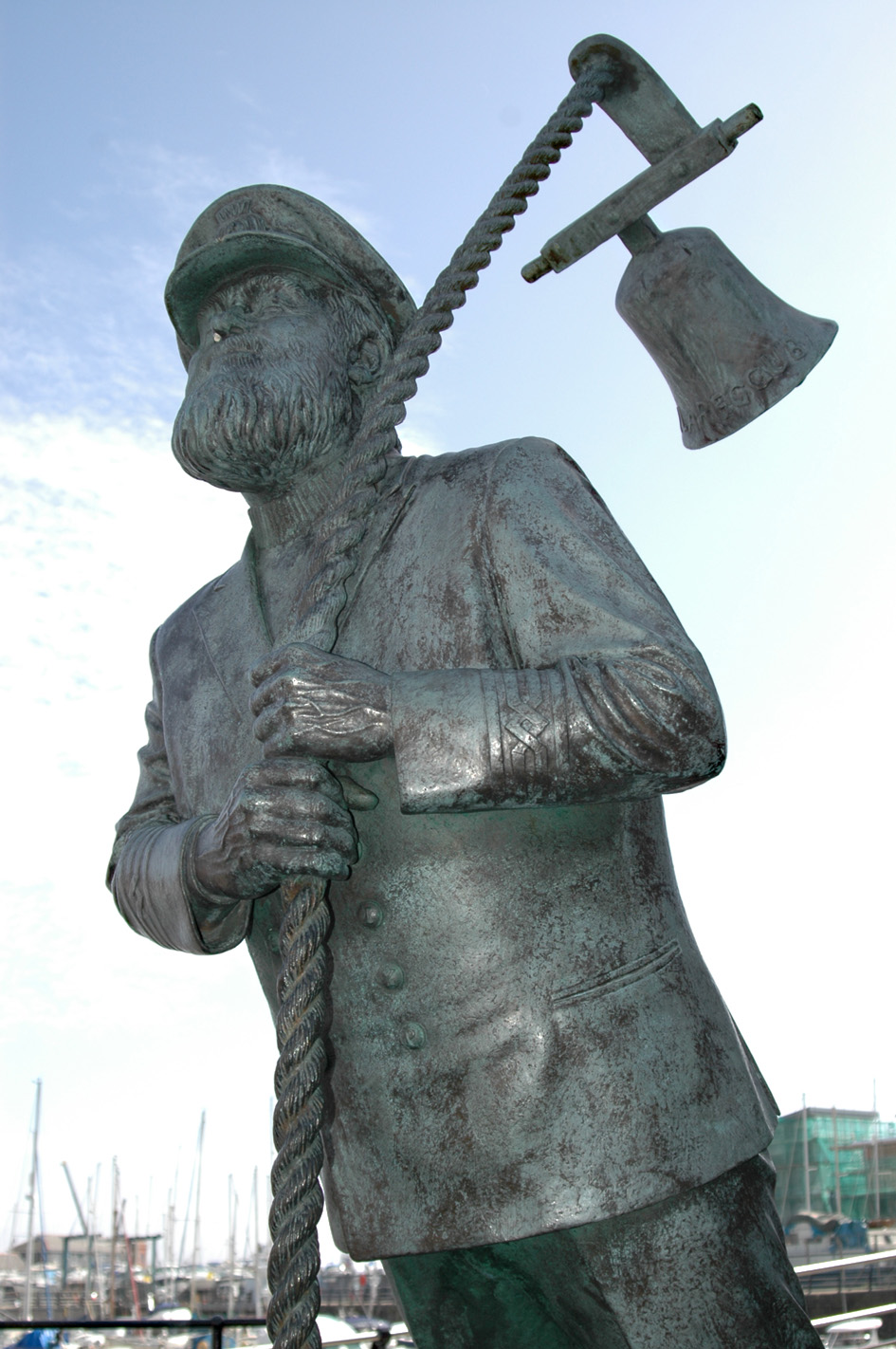
- Statue in Swansea's Maritime Quarter of Captain Cat, one of the opera's main characters
- Based on: Under Milk Wood by Dylan Thomas
- Premiere: 3 April 2014; Taliesin Arts Centre, Swansea

Under Milk Wood: An Opera is a chamber opera in one act by the Welsh composer John Metcalf. The libretto is directly adapted from the play for voices Under Milk Wood by Dylan Thomas. It was premièred on 3 April 2014 at the Taliesin Arts Centre in Swansea.

== Composition and performance history ==
Under Milk Wood: An Opera is the seventh opera by John Metcalf, which he began composing in 2007, with the first workshops being held in 2008. The world premiere production was produced by Taliesin Arts Centre (Wales) in co-production with Le Chien Qui Chante (Quebec) and Companion Star (New York) and in association with Welsh National Opera, with the premiere performance at Taliesin Arts Centre in Swansea on 3 April 2014. The production was directed by Keith Turnbull, and the musical director was Wyn Davies, who also played the piano and synthesiser and sang the role of Organ Morgan.

== Roles ==
Roles, voice types, premiere cast
Role	Voice type	Premiere cast, 3 April 2014
Myfanwy Price / Polly Garter / Mrs Butcher Beynon / Mrs Floyd	soprano	Elizabeth Donovan
Gossamer Beynon / Lily Smalls / Mrs Pugh	soprano	Helen-Jane Howells
Mrs Ogmore-Pritchard / Mrs Organ Morgan / Mrs Dai Bread One / Bessie Bighead / Mae Rose-Cottage	soprano	Gweneth-Ann Jeffers
Rosie Probert / Mrs Cherry Owen / Mrs Willy Nilly / Mrs Dai Bread Two / Mrs Utah Watkins	mezzo-soprano	Karina Lucas
Mr Mog Edwards / Rev Eli Jenkins	tenor	Eamonn Mulhall
Organ Morgan	tenor	Wyn Davies
Dancing Williams / Mr Pritchard / Mr Pugh / Mr Floyd / Sinbad Sailors / Willy Nilly / Fisherman	baritone	Paul Carey Jones
Tom-Fred / Mr Waldo / Mr Ogmore / Cherry Owen / Utah Watkins / Inspector of Cruelty	baritone	Richard Morris
Captain Cat	bass	Michael Douglas Jones

== Instrumentation ==
The opera requires five instrumentalists: a string player who plays violin, viola and crwth; a harpist who plays concert harp and lever harp; a flautist who plays flute and bass flute; a keyboard player who plays piano and synthesiser; and a percussionist. There are also various other instruments and sound effects which include an accordion and are played by members of the cast.

== Reception ==
The premiere production received broadly positive coverage in the Welsh and UK press. It was nominated for Best World Premiere in the International Opera Awards, Best New Opera by the Royal Philharmonic Society, Best Opera and Best Scenic and Costume Design in the Wales Theatre Awards. The Guardian named the opera one of the best of 2014.

In his review for The Telegraph, John Allison called it "an operatic testimony for (Dylan) Thomas", praising Metcalf's music "that captures the ripeness of Thomas’s vision and never works against the poetry", while also noting a lack of contrast in the "dreamy" mood of the score. Writing for The Times, Anna Picard noted the influence of Benjamin Britten on Metcalf's score, comparing it to Albert Herring, and again praised the setting of the text "with due attention to the glorious mouth-feel of Thomas' poetry". Rian Evans in Opera repeated the praise for Metcalf's setting – "honouring the intrinsic musicality of Thomas' text was Metcalf's priority" – while pointing out that "the absence of dramatic plot as such" (of both Metcalf's piece and the original play) places greater importance than usual on the portrayal of the characters. For the Western Mail, Mike Smith praised the piece's soundscape, while raising the caveat that it "remains empathetic to the play but perhaps lacks some of the rawness, saltiness and grit of Thomas’ 'fugue for voices'".

== Recordings ==
A recording of the opera featuring the original cast was released by Ty Cerdd Records on 27 October 2014.

== Adaptations ==
An arrangement of the scene between Rosie Probert and Captain Cat was made by John Metcalf for two voices and piano, and premiered at the 2021 Bangor Music Festival, performed by Caryl Hughes, Paul Carey Jones and Wyn Davies.
