= Phillip Joll =

Welsh operatic baritone

- Born: 14 March 1954 (age 71); Merthyr Tydfil, Wales
- Genres: Opera
- Occupation: Baritone

Phillip Joll (born 14 March 1954) is a Welsh operatic baritone known for his portrayal of Wotan in Wagner's Der Ring des Nibelungen.

Born 14 March 1954 in Merthyr Tydfil, Joll was a pupil at Cyfarthfa High School, before joining the Royal Northern College of Music. He graduated from the National Opera Studio in London. Joll has appeared with the English and Welsh National Operas. He appears in a wide variety of roles in the German and Italian repertoire in roles such as Simon Boccanegra, Falstaff, Rigoletto, Tonio in Pagliacci, and Wozzeck.

His Australian debut was as Jochanaan in Richard Strauss' Salome in 1988 for the Lyric Opera of Queensland. He first sang Wotan with the Seattle Opera in 2000.
