= Mark Shanahan =

Irish conductor and conducting teacher

Mark Shanahan is an Irish conductor and conducting teacher.

== Biography ==
Mark Shanahan was born in Manchester, where he attended Chetham's School. He later attended the University of London and studied conducting at the Royal Academy of Music with the Sir Henry Wood Scholarship. While still studying at the Royal Academy of Music he won the first prize of the first NAYO Conducting Competition.

Mark Shanahan is active as an opera and orchestral conductor, and he has been associated with the English National Opera. Mark Shanahan has conducted operas in theatres such as La Fenice, Théâtre Graslin, Nationale Reisopera, Opera North, Grange Park Opera, Opera Ireland, English Touring Opera, Marseilles Opera and the Oper Frankfurt.

Guest conducting engagements include concerts at halls such as the Royal Festival Hall, Barbican Centre and Royal Albert Hall with orchestras including the RTÉ National Symphony Orchestra, Royal Philharmonic Orchestra, Orchestra of Opera North, Stavanger Symphony Orchestra and the Orquesta Filarmónica de Gran Canaria. He is also Guest Conductor of the Netherlands Symphony Orchestra and Artistic director of the Forest Philharmonic Orchestra.

Shanahan was appointed Head of Music at the National Opera Studio in 2010. In 2021 he was dismissed after the organisation received complaints from "young artists, coaches, staff members and external colleagues" about "behaviour was that it was intimidating, bullying and possibly discriminatory". He later won an unfair dismissal case against his former employer although the presiding judge noted his "blameworthy conduct" and that had he remained in employment there was a 40% chance that he would have been fairly dismissed.

Shanahan is a guest professor of conducting at the Royal Academy of Music, guest conductor at the Guildhall School of Music and Drama and a Visiting conducting Fellow at the Royal Northern College of Music in Manchester.
