= Margaret Haggart =

Australian singer

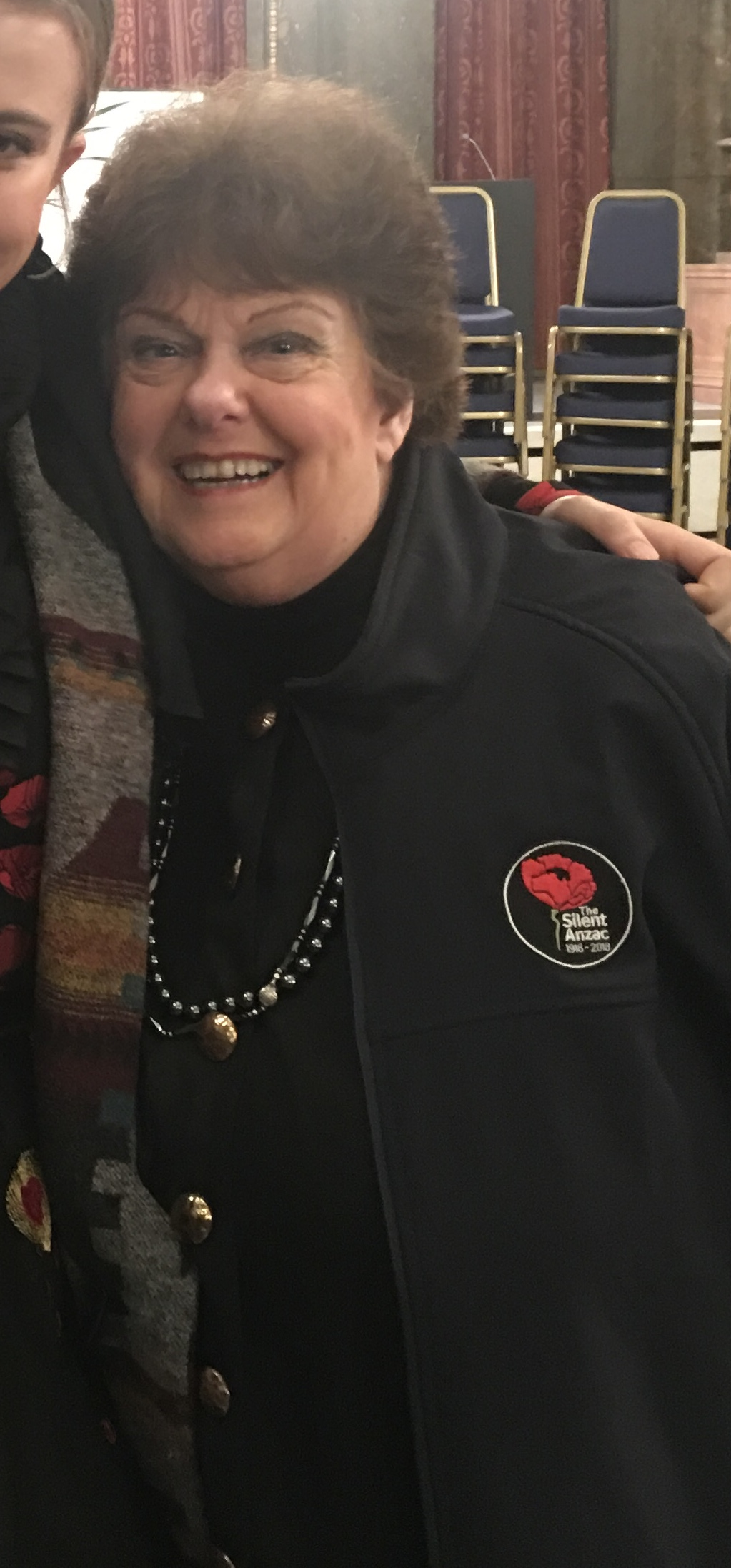
Margaret Haggart in Australia House, London after a performance of the Silent Anzac on Remembrance Day 2018

Margaret Haggart is an Australian operatic soprano and community arts founder based in Melbourne, Australia. Her career spans over 90 operatic, operetta and cabaret roles, performed in the United Kingdom, Italy, France, the United States of America, South America, Singapore, New Zealand and Australia. She is a board member of Melbourne Opera, Green Room Awards and a committee member for the now finished Mietta Song Competition.

In June 2023 she was awarded an Order of Australia for services to the performing arts.

== Early life ==
Haggart grew up in the Melbourne suburb of Footscray, her father a Scottish coal miner migrated to Australia and met her mother of English heritage when they were working at a zip factory in Deer Park. Haggart attended North Footscray Primary School and Footscray Girls High School. In her teenage years, she participated in choir and light opera opportunities in her local community. She studied voice with Antonio Moretti-Pananti.

Haggart performed regularly with the Williamstown Light Opera, Hawthorn Light Opera, and was a founding member of the Victoria State Opera.

== International career ==
In 1972, Haggart moved to the United Kingdom where she regularly performed with the English National Opera, Welsh National Opera, Opera North and Scottish Opera. She was particularly known for singing Mozart's Königin der Nacht from the opera Die Zauberflöte.

She sang for the BBC Proms at Royal Albert Hall in 1976. In France she sang with the Opéra national de Lorraine (formerly known as Opéra de Nancy) and Chorégies d'Orange.

== Association with Gian Carlo Menotti ==
Haggart was invited by Gian Carlo Menotti to perform in his Festival dei Due Mondi in Spoleto in 1986. This included the recorded-to-video performance of Menotti's La santa di Bleecker Street for the festival. She then travelled to the US and performed in the same production for the 10th U.S. Spoleto Festival. Menotti founded the Spoleto Festival Melbourne, where she was invited to perform in its opening season.

== Discography ==
- Concerto on Australian Themes, An Australian in Paris (1998) – Naxos, 8.554368
- Hansel and Gretel, Humperdinck (1999) – Opera D'Oro, OPD-1204

== Filmography ==
- "Mrs Grosse" in The Turn of the Screw: Britten, Opera Australia, ABC Video (1991)
- "Witch" in Hansel and Gretel, Humperdinck, Opera Australia ABC Video (1992)
- "Maria Corona" in La santa di Bleecker Street, Menotti, Festival dei Due Mondi di Spoleto (1986)
- "Berta" in The Barber of Seville, Rossini, Victoria State Opera, ABC Video (1984)
