= Nicholas Sharratt =

English operatic tenor

Nicholas Sharratt is an English operatic tenor from Nottingham.

== Biography ==
Sharratt studied at the Royal Northern College of Music and the National Opera Studio.

He has performed the title role in Orpheus in the Underworld for Scottish Opera and Ernesto in Don Pasquale for English Touring Opera. Other principal roles include Nemorino in L'elisir d'amore for Grange Park Opera and Pedrillo in Die Entführung aus dem Serail for Opera North.

In 2012 he played Count Almaviva in The Barber of Seville for English Touring Opera, and created the role of Sam in Ghost Patrol by Stuart MacRae in a Scottish Opera/Music Theatre Wales production that won the 2013 South Bank Sky Arts Award for Opera.

In 2013 he played Frederic in the Scottish Opera/D'Oyly Carte Opera Company co-production of The Pirates of Penzance.
