= Arlene Saunders =

American opera singer (1930–2020)

Arlene Saunders (Cleveland, October 5, 1930 – April 17, 2020) was an American spinto soprano opera singer. After making her operatic debut as Rosalinde von Eisenstein, in Die Fledermaus, with the National Opera Company in 1958, she made her first appearance with the New York City Opera in 1961, as Giorgetta in Il tabarro (conducted by Julius Rudel). With that company, she soon sang in Carmen (as Micaëla), La bohème (as Mimì), Louise (opposite Norman Treigle as the Père), Die lustige Witwe and Don Giovanni (as Donna Elvira).

In 1964, Saunders began a relationship with the Hamburg State Opera, with whom she made films of Le nozze di Figaro (as the Contessa, 1967), Der Freischütz (1968), and Die Meistersinger (with Giorgio Tozzi and Richard Cassilly, 1970). With the company she also created the part of the music teacher in the world premiere of Gian Carlo Menotti's Help, Help, the Globolinks! in 1968 (which was filmed the following year). For RCA, she recorded Il re pastore (with Lucia Popp and Reri Grist), in 1967. In 1971, she created the title role in Ginastera's Beatrix Cenci, which she repeated at the City Opera in 1973. She sang at the Metropolitan Opera in 1976, as Eva in Die Meistersinger, and in 1978, the soprano returned to the City Opera for La fanciulla del West. She also appeared at Milan, London (Covent Garden), Paris, Vienna, Rome, Leeds (Senta in 1979) and Buenos Aires.

Saunders appeared on the January 8, 1962 episode of the CBS gameshow To Tell the Truth, posing as an imposter for a dog trainer.

In 1967, Saunders was named a Kammersängerin, in Hamburg. In 1985 she gave her Farewell as the Marschallin in Der Rosenkavalier, at the Teatro Colón. In 1986, she married Raymond Adrian Raskin of New York and Santa Fe.

She died in New York City on April 17, 2020, at the age of eighty-nine, from COVID-19.
