= Charles Edwards (stage designer) =

English opera designer and director

Charles Edwards (born in Newcastle-upon-Tyne October 9, 1965) is an English opera designer and director. Edwards attended the Central School of Art and Design in London. His work as a stage designer includes productions of Tristan und Isolde at the Grange Park Opera, A Midsummer Night's Dream at the English National Opera, and Il Trittico at the Scottish Opera.

He made his directing debut at the Mid Wales Opera in 2001 with Cosi fan tutte. As a director he is noted for his productions of Strauss’s Elektra at the Royal Opera and Bellini's I Puritani at the Metropolitan Opera.
