= Dietfried Bernet =

Austrian conductor

- Born: 14 May 1940; Vienna, Nazi Germany
- Died: 23 May 2011 (aged 71); Hohenems, Austria
- Occupation: Conductor

Dietfried Bernet (14 May 1940 – 23 May 2011) was an Austrian orchestra conductor.

== Life ==
Born in Vienna, Bernet studied in his native hometown with Hans Swarowsky and Dimitri Mitropoulos, conducted his first concerts at the Vienna Musikverein at the age of 18 and won 1st prize at the International Conducting Competition in Liverpool at the age of 22.

At 23, he conducted Verdi's La traviata at the Spoleto Festival (directed by Luchino Visconti), was conductor at the Vienna Volksoper at 24, conductor at the Vienna State Opera at 26, and General Music Director of the Philharmonisches Staatsorchester Mainz at 34. From 1995 to 2000, he was guest principal conductor at the Royal Opera House in Copenhagen.

He has appeared regularly with the major orchestras of Europe and overseas such as the Teatro Colón in Buenos Aires, the Teatro La Fenice in Venice, La Monnaie in Brussels as well as Zurich, Hamburg, the US, Canada, Brazil, Chile, conducted at major opera houses such as the Royal Opera House, the English National Opera, the Houston Grand Opera, the Vienna State Opera, the Deutsche Oper Berlin, the Berlin State Opera, the Bavarian State Opera, the Hamburg State Opera, Cologne, Stuttgart, Monte Carlo, Catania, Barcelona, Copenhagen, Stockholm, Oslo, the Teatro San Carlo Naples and any others.

From 2005 to 2008, Bernet was honorary conductor and music director of the Tyrolean Symphony Orchestra Innsbruck, conducted at the Salzburg Festival, the Festival dei Due Mondi, the 1996, 1999, 2005 Glyndebourne Festival, the 2003 and 2005 Bregenz Festival (CD recording Bohuslav Martinů's Julietta). Along the way, he made numerous radio, television and CD recordings.

As a composer, Bernet has a work published by Universal-Edition. For Bärenreiter Verlag he has translated Bohuslav Martinů's Czech opera Julietta into German together with Aleš Březina and is the author of the book Argumente für den Herrn im Frack. Was Sie schon immer über das Dirigieren wissen wollten.

Bernet was a member of the masonic lodge Equality since 1970 and a founding member of the Zur Wahrheit lodge in 1974.

Bernet died in Hohenems, Vorarlberg at the age of 71.

== Awards ==
- Berufstitel Professor (awarded by the Austrian federal president)
- Austrian Decoration for Science and Art (2001)
- Multiple awards with the "Premio de Criticos" by the Circolo de Criticos.

== Publication ==
- Argumente für den Herrn im Frack. Was Sie schon immer über das Dirigieren wissen wollten Limbus Verlag, Hohenems 2008, ISBN 3-902534-14-1.
