= Annabel Arden =

British theatre and opera director

- Born: 11 November 1959 (age 67); London, England
- Education: St Paul's Girls' School; Newnham College, Cambridge
- Occupations: Theatre and opera director, actress
- Spouse: Stephen Jeffreys (died 2018)

Annabel Arden (born 11 November 1959) is a British actress, theatre and opera director, and one of the co-founders of Théâtre de Complicité.

== Early life and education ==
Arden was born in London in 1959 and studied English from 1978 to 1981 at Newnham College, Cambridge.

== Career ==
=== Théâtre de Complicité ===
After university, she trained at Jacques Lecoq's theatre school in Paris with Monika Pagneux and Philippe Gaulier. She then toured internationally with Neil Bartlett. In 1983 Arden founded Théâtre de Complicité with Simon McBurney and Marcello Magni.

=== Opera ===
For Opera North, Arden has directed The Magic Flute, The Return of Ulysses, La Traviata and The Cunning Little Vixen. In addition, for the English National Opera, she has directed The Rake’s Progress. At Glyndebourne Festival Opera, she has directed Puccini’s Gianni Schicchi, Rachmaninov’s The Miserly Knight, Donizetti's L'elisir d'amore.and Rossini's The Barber of Seville.

=== Theatre ===
As well as acting and directing for Théâtre de Complicité, Arden has also worked with plays at the National Theatre, the Arcola, the Royal Court as well as for BBC Radio.

== Personal life ==
Arden was married to playwright Stephen Jeffreys, until his death on 17 September 2018.

Awards

- Time Out Award 1987
- Olivier Award 1991
- Olivier Nomination The Rakes Progress 2002
- European Woman of Achievement Award in recognition of an outstanding contribution to pan-European understanding and progress that provides and inspiration to others 2003

== Productions with Théâtre de Complicité ==
- 1983: Put It On Your Head (The Almeida Theatre, London) — as actress
- 1985: A Minute Too Late (until 2005 all over Europe, in the USA, South Amerika, Israel and Sri Lanka) — co-director
- 1986: Foodstuff — actress
- 1986: Please, Please, Please — director and actress
- 1987: Anything For A Quiet Life (The Almeida Theatre, London, and in 1989 as TV production for Channel 4) — actress
- 1988: Burning Ambition
- 1989: Dürrenmatt: The Visit (London, Zürich, Hong Kong, Australien) — director (with Simon McBurney)
- 1989: The Phantom Violin — actress
- 1992: The Street of Crocodiles, a both the life and work of writer Bruno Schulz (Royal National Theatre, thereafter on a worldwide tour) — actress
- 1992: Shakespeare: The Winter's Tale (Seymour Theatre Centre Sydney, thereafter in Hong Kong and London) — director
- 1994: The Three Lives of Lucie Cabrol (Manchester and thereafter tour til 1996) — collaboration
- 1994: Out of a house walked a man … — collaboration
- 1997: John Berger: To The Wedding (Radio production for BBC Radio 3) — speaker
- 1999: Mnemonic
- 2013: The Lionboy (Bristol Old Vic, thereafter on Tour) — director
