= Jeffrey Lawton =

English tenor and opera singer

Jeffrey Lawton FRNCM
- Born: 11 December 1938; Oldham, Lancashire, England
- Died: 4 May 2018 (aged 79)
- Genre: Opera
- Occupation: Opera singer (tenor)
- Years active: 1959 – 2014 (22 June)

Jeffrey Lawton, FRNCM (11 December 1938 – 4 May 2018), was a tenor best known as an international opera singer. He began his career as a student at the Royal Manchester College of Music and from 1982 to 1987 was principal tenor with the Welsh National Opera Company. Lawton also sang with Opera North and the Scottish Opera. On one occasion in 1990 he substituted for the ill Plácido Domingo in the role of Otello at the Royal Opera, London under Carlos Kleiber. As well as singing at various British festivals and the BBC Proms at the Royal Albert Hall, other pursuits included president of the Wagner Society Manchester and patron of the Oldham Choral Society. Lawton was a tutor and a Fellow of the Royal Northern College of Music (FRNCM).

== Selected performances ==
=== Welsh National Opera ===
- Otello - Otello, 1986
- The Trojans - Aeneas, 1987
- Die Frau ohne Schatten - The Emperor, 1989
- Tristan und Isolde - Tristan, 1993

=== Opera North ===
- Wozzeck - Captain, 1993
- Tannhäuser - Tannhäuser, 1997
- Der Kuhhandel - President Mendez, 2006

=== Scottish Opera ===
- The Greek Passion - Panait Katerina's lover, 1990
- Tristan und Isolde - Tristan a Cornish knight, 1994 & 1998
- Inés de Castro - Pedro Crown Prince of Portugal, 1996
- Peter Grimes - Peter Grimes a fisherman, 1997
- Die Meistersinger von Nürnberg - Balthasar Zorn a pewterer, 2006

=== Royal Opera House ===
- Der Ring des Nibelungen, Siegfried - Siegfried, 1986
- Otello - Otello, 1990
- Elektra - Aegisth, 1994

== Film appearances ==
- Othello TV film, Production company BBC, Broadcaster ZDF, 1985
- After Moscow, Production company Euston Films, 1983
