= Richard Farnes =

British conductor

Richard Farnes CBE (born 1964) is a British conductor, and was Music Director of Opera North from 2004 to 2016.

== Education ==
Farnes was a chorister at King's College, Cambridge before entering Eton College as a music scholar in 1977. He returned to King's as organ scholar in 1983 and subsequently studied at the Royal Academy of Music, the Guildhall School of Music and Drama and the National Opera Studio.

== Later career ==
During his professional career, he has conducted operas at the Royal Opera House, English National Opera, Scottish Opera, English Touring Opera, Glyndebourne Festival Opera and Glyndebourne on Tour, among other companies. He has also conducted the Royal Scottish National Orchestra and the Scottish Chamber Orchestra.

Before joining Opera North in 2004, Farnes had conducted The Secret Marriage, The Marriage of Figaro, Joan of Arc, La Traviata, Eugene Onegin, Gloriana and Tosca for the company, as well as the world première of The Nightingale's to Blame by Simon Holt. The operas he has conducted since becoming Music Director include La rondine, Salome, Falstaff, Macbeth, Katya Kabanova, the complete ring cycle and the award-winning Peter Grimes.

He relinquished his post with Opera North following the 2015-16 season.

== Selected recordings ==
- Bluebeard's Castle (Chandos Opera in English), with John Tomlinson, Sally Burgess and the Orchestra of Opera North

Cultural offices
Preceded by Steven Sloane	Music Director, Opera North; 2004-2016	Succeeded by Aleksandar Marković
