= Pamela Helen Stephen =

British classical mezzo-soprano (1964–2021)

- Born: 27 January 1964
- Died: 30 November 2021 (aged 57)
- Education: Royal Scottish Academy of Music and Drama
- Occupation: Opera singer
- Known for: Classical mezzo-soprano
- Awards: Robert Helpmann Award

Pamela Helen Stephen (27 January 1964 – 30 November 2021) was a British classical mezzo-soprano, who sang in operas and oratorios.

== Biography and career ==
Pamela Helen Stephen was born in Solihull on 27 January 1964. She grew up in Scotland, and studied at the Royal Scottish Academy of Music and Drama, where she obtained a bachelor's degree in musical performance in 1986. She later studied opera, lieder and oratorio singing, at the Opera Theater Center at Aspen, Colorado, with Herta Glaz, and at the University of Toronto, with Patricia Kern.

Pamela Helen Stephen performed with many of the world's leading conductors, including André Previn, Sir Charles Mackerras, John Eliot Gardiner, Antonio Pappano, Andris Nelsons, Vladimir Jurowski, Sir Simon Rattle, Richard Hickox, Edward Gardner, and Sir Richard Armstrong. She sang at festivals such as Edinburgh International Festival, the BBC Proms, the Aldeburgh, Cheltenham, and Wexford Festivals, and the Spoleto Festival and with orchestras including the London Symphony Orchestra, BBC National Orchestra Wales, Bournemouth Symphony Orchestra, City of Birmingham Symphony Orchestra, Scottish Chamber Orchestra, Royal Northern Sinfonia, Berliner Konzerthausorkester, Royal Scottish National Orchestra, and Orchestra Sinfonica di Milano.

She notably performed as Caesar in Opera North's 2012 production of Handel's Giulio Cesare, and Dido, in Purcell's Dido and Aeneas, also with Opera North in 2013. She sang the role of Penelope in Benedict Andrews's production of The Return of Ulysses for English National Opera and Suzuki in Anthony Minghella's production of Madame Butterfly, also for ENO. She was Hécube in the 2012 production of Berlioz's Les Troyens, directed by David McVicar at the Royal Opera House, and performed in works by Vaughan Williams, Britten, Verdi and others.

Pamela Helen Stephen made several dozen recordings, including Strauss' Ariadne auf Naxos, Szymanowski's Stabat Mater, Mozart's The Marriage of Figaro, conducted by Sir John Eliot Gardiner, Ravel's L'enfant et les sortilèges, led by André Previn, various Haydn Masses with Collegium Musicum 90, conducted by Richard Hickox, and Ryan Wigglesworth's Echo and Narcissus.

Pamela Helen Stephen was nominated for the Robert Helpmann Award and won Scottish Opera's John Noble Award, the Caird Scholarship, the Countess of Munster Award and the Canadian/Scottish Philharmonic Society Award.

She was the third wife of Richard Hickox, until his death in 2008. They had two children together. She died from cancer on 30 November 2021, at the age of 57.
