= David Hillman (tenor) =

British opera singer (1934–2009)

David Hillman (21 November 1934 – 8 August 2009) was an English operatic tenor who sang with all the leading opera companies in the United Kingdom.

== Early career ==
David Hillman was born in London, England. From 1957 to 1962, he worked as a quantity surveyor.

From 1960 to 1963, he studied at the National Opera School with Joan Cross, and he also studied privately with Antony Benskin and Otakar Kraus. His professional opera debut was as Arvino in I Lombardi with Welsh National Opera in 1962, and early engagements with that company and with Sadler's Wells Opera included the principal tenor roles in The Queen of Spades, La traviata, The Magic Flute, Die Entführung aus dem Serail, La bohème and Gloriana, as well as those in The Mikado, Ruddigore, and La belle Hélène.

== Major debuts and premières ==
Hillman debuted at the Netherlands Opera in 1972 as Tom Rakewell in The Rake's Progress, at Santa Fe Opera in 1974 as Fritz in La Grande-Duchesse de Gérolstein, at the Royal Opera House, Covent Garden, in 1976 as Malcolm in Macbeth, at the Opera Theatre of Saint Louis in 1979 as Bacchus in Ariadne auf Naxos and with Glyndebourne Festival Opera as Count Elemer in Arabella.

He also created roles in the world premières of operas by Thea Musgrave, Iain Hamilton, Malcolm Williamson (The Violins of Saint-Jacques), Stephen Paulus and, most notably, Richard Rodney Bennett's The Mines of Sulphur. British stage premières included King Roger (1975, for the New Opera Company) and Saul and David (1977, for University College Opera). He sang Sinon in a hitherto unstaged episode in Part 1 (La prise de Troie) of Les Troyens for Opera North in 1986.

== Later career ==
Hillman continued to sing roles such as Eisenstein (Die Fledermaus), Janek (The Makropulos Affair) and the title role in The Tales of Hoffmann for English National Opera (and the latter role also for Opera North). He sang numerous roles for Scottish Opera in the 1970s and 1980s, including Eisenstein, Nero in L'incoronazione di Poppea, Edgardo in Lucia di Lammermoor, Almaviva in The Barber of Seville, Cassio in Otello, Macduff in Macbeth and Lysander in A Midsummer Night's Dream. In his later years he continued to sing with smaller companies.

== Death ==
David Hillman's death in 2009 was caused by a brain tumour.

== Television roles ==
1973

- The Yeomen of the Guard as Colonel Fairfax
- The Mikado as Nanki-Poo

1975

- Gianni Schicchi as Rinuccio

1980

- What The Old Man Does Is Always Right (with Sir Geraint Evans) as Second Traveller

1982

- The Yeomen of the Guard as Colonel Fairfax
- Iolanthe as Lord Tolloller

1987

- La traviata as Gastone
