= Linda Finnie =

Scottish opera singer

Linda Finnie (born 9 May 1952) is a Scottish mezzo-soprano. She made her debut in 1976 with Scottish Opera, and has since made appearances all over Europe, including at Bayreuth (in 1988).
