= Eric Garrett =

English operatic bass (1931–2009)

Eric Garrett (10 June 1931 – Majorca, Spain, 7 May 2009) was an English operatic bass.

== Biography ==
Born in Skelton-in-Cleveland, Yorkshire, Garrett was a member of the roster of singers at the Royal Opera, London at Covent Garden for forty years. He joined the opera company's chorus in 1956 and was promoted to principal in 1962. He sang more than fifty roles with the Royal Opera during his lengthy career, particularly excelling in comprimario roles. His deft characterization of the Sacristan in the 1964 Franco Zeffirelli staging of Giacomo Puccini's Tosca was particularly admired. He died in Majorca, Spain at the age of 77.
