= Wyn Davies (conductor) =

Welsh conductor

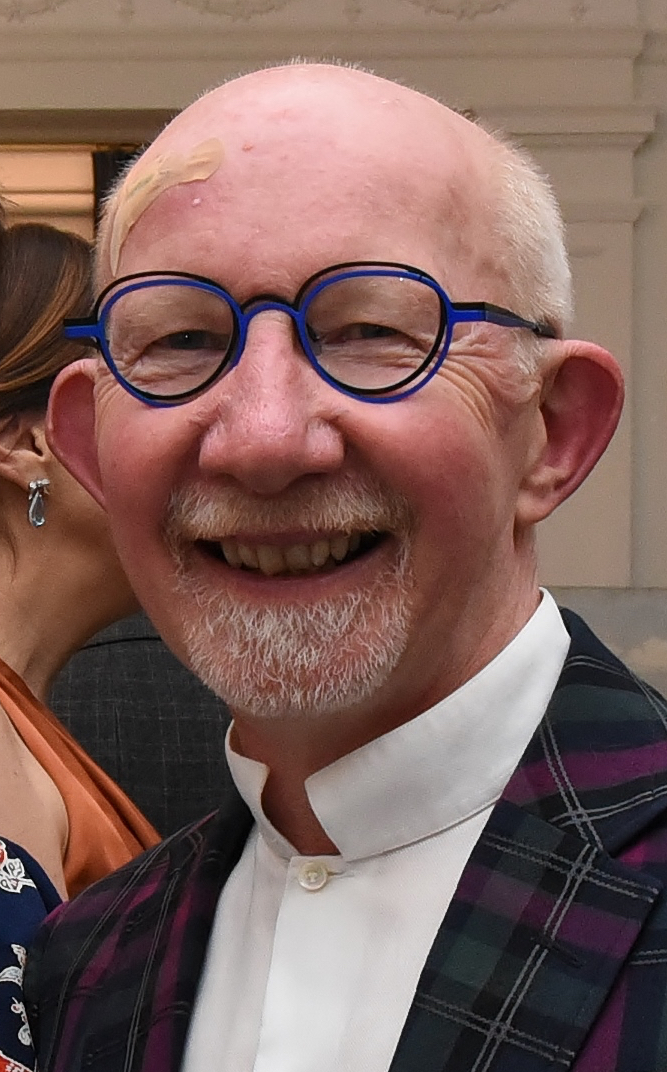
- Davies in 2018
- Born: 8 May 1952 (age 74); Gowerton, West Glamorgan, Wales
- Occupation: Conductor

Wyn Davies (born 8 May 1952 in Gowerton, Wales) is a Welsh conductor.

After graduating from Christ Church, Oxford, Davies joined the Welsh National Opera as a Staff Conductor in 1974. From 1987, Davies spent two years as assistant conductor at the Metropolitan Opera, New York and undertook two winter seasons for the Banff Centre for the Performing Arts in Canada which included the 1989 award-winning production of Weill's Threepenny Opera in Toronto.

In 2005, Davies was appointed director of music to New Zealand Opera. In Britain he regularly conducts at the Buxton Festival, with the Hallé Orchestra and for Opera North.

In 2014, he was musical director for the world premiere production of John Metcalf's Under Milk Wood: An Opera, an adaptation of Dylan Thomas' play for voices. The premiere performance took place at Taliesin Arts Centre, Swansea on 3 April 2014. Davies also sang the role of Organ Morgan and played piano and synthesizer in the piece.

In 2015, he released a CD of his cabaret "Just Wyn" on the Stone Records label.
