= Oliver von Dohnányi =

Slovak conductor

Oliver von Dohnányi (born 2 March 1955) is a Slovak conductor based in Prague, Czech Republic.

== Life and career ==
Dohnányi was born in Trenčín, Czechoslovakia (now in Slovakia) and studied violin, composition and conducting at the Prague Academy for Music under Václav Neumann and the University of Music and Performing Arts in Vienna under Otmar Suitner. He made his conducting debut in 1979 with the Slovak Radio Symphony Orchestra in Bratislava. Previously, Dohnányi served as the music director of the Czech National Theatre in Prague, Intendent/Artistic Director of the Opera of the Slovak National Theatre in Bratislava, Intendent/Artistic Director of the Opera of the Moravian-Silesian National Theatre in Ostrava, and principal conductor of the Slovak Sinfonietta.

In 2018, Dohnányi received the biggest Russian theatrical award, The Golden Mask, with the title "Best Conductor".

Dohnányi is also a member of the well-known Dohnányi family, a notable Hungarian family of politicians and musicians.
