= Vivian Tierney =

English operatic soprano (born 1957)

Vivian Tierney (born London, 26 November 1957) is an English operatic soprano, who has sung across a wide range of repertoire in the United Kingdom and Europe, and made several recordings.

== Life and career ==
Tierney was born in Highgate, London, but grew up in Manchester and attended the Manchester Grammar School for Girls. Although no other members of her family were musical, she had decided she wanted to be an opera singer after watching a performance of La bohème from Covent Garden on television. She attended Saturday morning lessons at Oldham Rep from the age of six, which involved learning how to speak prose and verse, and became a member of local choirs. From an early age she appreciated music, but was most interested in "the more emotional stuff ... verismo and 20th-century music". From the age of 14 Tierney took singing lessons with Rita Crosby.

While still at school, her singing teacher pushed her to audition for the D'Oyly Carte Opera Company, where at the age of 17 she was successful in getting into the chorus. She also understudied and occasionally played the small Gilbert and Sullivan roles of Lady Ella in Patience and Giulia in The Gondoliers. This gave her much practical experience, and led to principal roles in the company, from 1977 to 1979, including the title role in Princess Ida (her professional debut), Mabel in The Pirates of Penzance, Josephine in H.M.S. Pinafore, and Elsie Maynard in The Yeomen of the Guard. She returned to the company in 1981–82, adding another major role, Yum-Yum in The Mikado. While there, she met and married another D'Oyly Carte artiste, Gareth Jones (c. 1948–2010). She was spotted by Tom Hawkes who engaged her for roles at Sadler's Wells in The Count of Luxembourg and The Gypsy Princess. This in turn led to being asked to sing Edwige in Kent Opera's Robinson Crusoe.

Her debut at the English National Opera was in 1986 substituting for an indisposed Lesley Garrett in Orpheus in the Underworld. Her major break at the London Coliseum was taking the title role in the premiere of Robin Holloway's Clarissa, in 1990. She went on to sing Regan in Lear, Mimì, Malinka/Etherea/Kunka in The Adventures of Mr Brouček, Fiordiligi, Tatyana, Salome and Ellen Orford, before creating Mrs Foran in The Silver Tassie in the 2000 premiere.

Tierney also sang with companies such as the Montpellier Festival (Mimì and Donna Anna), Flanders Opera, and Opera North (The Merry Widow). As a member of the Freiburg Opera, she sang Ellen Orford, Giulietta, Jenny, Marschallin and Renata.

She also appeared in other opera houses in Europe including Munich, Monte Carlo, Nancy and Basle. At the latter she sang the Dyer's Wife in Die Frau ohne Schatten, a highlight of the 1994/95 season, although she had thought she was being auditioned for the role of the Empress.

At Glyndebourne Festival Opera she sang Ellen Orford (Peter Grimes) in 1992, 1994 and 2000 and Mrs Coyle (Owen Wingrave) in 1997.

An only child, Tierney's father died when she was still young. Her marriage to Jones ended in divorce; her son David played the part of Marie's son alongside his mother in the Baylis Programme Wozzeck. Tierney later married the Canadian tenor Alan Woodrow.

== Recordings ==
Her recordings include Lehár's Der Graf von Luxemburg (Juliette Vermont), Britten's The Turn of the screw (Miss Jessel) and Peter Grimes (Ellen Orford), Mozart's Don Giovanni (Elvira) in English, and Nyman's Man and Boy: Dada (Michael's Mother, Old Woman, Bus Conductress, British Museum Guard, BBC Interviewer). She is also heard on the 1982 D'Oyly Carte Opera Company "Last Night" recording and seen in a concert video, "Gilbert & Sullivan's Greatest Hits", recorded at Royal Albert Hall in October 1982.
