= Antony McDonald =

British performance director and designer

Antony McDonald is a British opera and theatre designer and director.

In 2013, McDonald won the Set Design Award at the International Opera Awards. He won the Golden Mask for best costume design in a musical production (Russia) for L'Enfant et les Sortileges at the Bolshoi Moscow, and the Irish Times Best Costume design award for Gerald Barry's opera The Importance of Being Earnest.
