= Jonathan Summers =

Australian operatic baritone (born 1946)

Jonathan Summers (born 2 October 1946) is an Australian operatic baritone who has mainly worked in the United Kingdom. He sang the role of Captain Balstrode in the 1980 recording of Benjamin Britten's Peter Grimes which won a Grammy award for Best Opera recording.

== Early life ==
Summers was born in Melbourne, where he studied art at Prahran Technical College (1964–9) and trained as a vocalist with Bettine McCaughan (1964–74). From 1970 to 1974, he worked as a technical operator and recording engineer with the Radio Division of the Australian Broadcasting Commission. In September 1973 he won the ABC Instrumental and Vocal Competition. He followed with winning the Sun Aria competition in the next month. The same year he won the television talent quest BP Showcase. In 1974, he moved to London, where he studied with Otakar Kraus until 1980.

== Career ==
Summers's professional debut in opera took place in 1975, when he sang the title role in Rigoletto with Kent Opera. He was a member of The Royal Opera, Covent Garden, from 1976 to 1986, singing such roles as Albert in Werther, the Animal Tamer in the British premiere of the three-act version of Lulu, Demetrius in A Midsummer Night's Dream, Papageno in The Magic Flute, Ford in Falstaff, Sharpless in Madama Butterfly and Marcello in La bohème. He has also appeared with English National Opera, Scottish Opera, Opera North and Welsh National Opera.
