= National Opera Studio =

Music school in London, England

Coordinates: 51°27′24.41″N 0°11′41.45″W

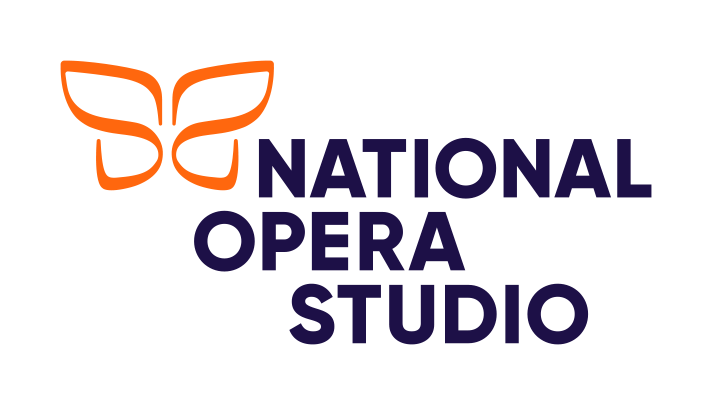
- Founded: 7 October 1977; 49 years ago
- Type: Registered company limited by guarantee
- Registration no.: England & Wales 274755
- Location: The Clore Building, 2 Chapel Yard, Wandsworth High Street, London, SW18 4HZ
- Origins: London, England, UK
- Website: nationaloperastudio.org.uk
- Formerly called: National School of Opera; London Opera Centre

The National Opera Studio in London, England was established in 1977 by the Arts Council as a link between the music colleges and the six main UK opera companies. It was resident at Morley College in Lambeth until 2003, when it gained use for the first time of its own dedicated premises in Chapel Yard, Wandsworth.

Alumni include Alfie Boe, Susan Bullock and Wynne Evans.

Its funding comes in part from the six main UK opera companies – Royal Opera House, English National Opera, Welsh National Opera, Scottish Opera, Opera North and the Glyndebourne Festival Opera, and it is an Arts Council England National Portfolio Organisation (2023–26).

== Programme ==
The National Opera Studio's nine month programme has places for up to 12 singers and four repetiteurs, who are offered residencies, opera scenes showcases and masterclasses with its constituent opera company sponsors.
