= Alan Oke =

British tenor

Alan Oke is a British tenor. Born in London and raised in Scotland, he studied both at the Royal Scottish Academy of Music and Drama in Glasgow and with Hans Hotter in Munich.

== Career ==
Following a successful career as a baritone, he made his debut as a tenor in 1992 singing Brighella in Ariadne auf Naxos for Garsington Opera. Since then, he has sung a wide variety of roles with Scottish Opera, Opera North, the Royal Opera, English National Opera, and Opera New Zealand, as well as appearances at the Edinburgh, Aldeburgh, Bregenz, and Ravenna Festivals.

He portrayed Marlow in Tarik O'Regan's Heart of Darkness at the Royal Opera House and Gandhi in Philip Glass's Satyagraha for the English National Opera and the Metropolitan Opera, in New York City.

In 2016, he premiered the role of The Major in Elena Langer's opera Figaro Gets a Divorce at the Welsh National Opera.

He played Peter Grimes in the performance of Britten's opera on Aldeburgh Beach 2013 filmed as Grimes on the Beach.

He lives in Edinburgh, Scotland.
