= Motley Theatre Design Course =

Information
- Former name: Sadler's Wells Design Course; Theatre Design Course of the English National Opera
- Type: Postgraduate
- Established: 1966
- Founder: Stephen Arlen; Margaret Harris
- Closed: 2010

Motley Theatre Design Course was an independent postgraduate theatre design course based in London.

== History of the school ==
=== Sadler's Wells Opera and English National Opera ===
In 1962, Sadler's Wells Opera announced the appointment of their first permanent creative team of Glen Byam Shaw as Director of Productions, John Blatchley as his assistant and Margaret 'Percy' Harris MBE (of the Motley Theatre Design Group) as Head of Design, stressing that "apart from their eminence in the world of theatre, they have been connected with teaching, both on the dramatic side and design." This referred to their involvement in the Old Vic Theatre School (1947–1952), founded by Michel Saint-Denis, George Devine and Glen Byam Shaw. Percy Harris had previously taught at Michel Saint-Denis' experimental London Theatre Studio (1936–1939). Percy had taught Jocelyn Herbert RDI at the London Theatre Studio, and Jocelyn herself was to teach Percy's students from 1966 onwards. As Motley biographer Michael Mullin noted, Percy's aims for the school "hearkened back to the London Theatre Studio ideal of a ‘company’ who work in happy collaboration, rather than a group of individuals in creative competition with each other".

In 1966 a room was found for Percy to teach in, in nearby St John Street, and the Sadler's Wells Theatre Design Course began with 8 students. Students were to come from various parts of the world and disciplines so they could learn from each other. They were taught the techniques of their craft by staff at Sadlers Wells Opera and others. Projects were to be mainly led by directors. In an interview with Michael Billington in 1991, Percy Harris explained her philosophy of teaching: “It's all based on the work of Michel Saint-Denis…(who) believed that the most important person in the theatre was the dramatist, then the actors, and then the director and designer. He argued that the designer's job was to show the play and the actors to the best possible advantage. Also that they should not decorate: they should design. I suppose that is why our designers are very popular with dramatists. Edward Bond said that he couldn't have written for the theatre if it hadn't been for the Course, especially Hayden Griffin.” Hayden Griffin is the co-director of the school.

In 1969, Sadlers Wells Opera moved to their present home at the London Coliseum and became English National Opera. For a time the school moved into the vacated space at the top of the Sadler's Wells Theatre. In 1971, the school moved to Camperdown House, Aldgate to be near the company, and at this point became the English National Opera Theatre Design Course. Teachers at this time included Bill Bryden and Maria Björnson and students were also taught by the creative team at English National Opera who worked in the same building.

=== Riverside Studios and the Almeida Theatre ===
In 1979, organisational changes at English National Opera necessitated the school moving to the Riverside Studios, then under the lively directorship of David Gothard. It became the Theatre Design Course at the Riverside. The aims and training of the school were in harmony with the Riverside ethos and the school developed further ideas and flexibility. Students had access, either through formal teaching or observation, to Samuel Beckett, Edward Bond, Andrei Tarkovsky, Angela Carter, Bill Gaskill, David Leveaux, Anselm Kiefer, Sir Jonathan Miller, Sir David Hare, Tadeusz Kantor, Elijah Moshinsky, Sir Peter Hall, Michael Bogdanov, Danny Boyle and Percy's collaborator Elisabeth Montgomery. Students collaborated with young directors at the Drama Centre.

This arrangement lasted until 1987, when management changes at Riverside led to Artistic Director Pierre Audi welcoming the school at the Almeida Theatre which was also far-reaching in its ethos and exposed the young designers to Pierre's experimental programming of drama, contemporary music and opera. Teachers and visitors included Danny Boyle, Simon McBurney, Alec Guinness and Simon Callow.

=== Royal National Theatre and Covent Garden ===
By 1991, Pierre Audi had become Artistic Director of De Nederlandse Opera, and the school once again found itself without a home. It temporarily resided at the Royal National Theatre Paint Frame, and then, in 1992, in a warehouse in Shelton Street, Covent Garden. Finding itself for the first time independent of a producing theatre, the school renamed itself the Motley Theatre Design Course, after the Motley Theatre Design Group, the collective Percy Harris had formed with Sophie Harris and Elizabeth Montgomery. Alison Chitty RDI OBE joined Percy as co-director. As Jocelyn Herbert noted, "the school went through numerous financial crises, and many changes of venue; the fact that it survived was due to the loyalty, generosity and hard work of a small group of supporters inspired by Percy's dogged determination to keep it going."

=== Theatre Royal Drury Lane ===
In 1994 the school moved to the scene dock in the Theatre Royal Drury Lane where it remained until 2011. The end of year exhibitions were held first at the Theatre Museum in Covent Garden and subsequently at the Royal National Theatre Paint Frame. Former students Anthony Lamble and Ashley Martin-Davis joined the school as Associate Directors. During this period, the school also taught visiting students from the British American Drama Academy. Teachers at this time included Jane Howell, William Gaskill, Jocelyn Herbert, Sean Holmes and Simon Usher.

In early 2000, Percy Harris, who was still teaching at the age of 95, fell ill and died a few months later. The school continued to adhere to Percy's teaching philosophy. With an intake now of 11 students, the school initiated an annual project with students on the MFA Theatre Directing Course at Birkbeck, University of London. Teachers during this period included Lindsay Posner, Mike Leigh, James Macdonald, Steve Tompkins, David Eldridge, Simon Stephens, Martin Duncan, Philip Langridge, Michael Attenborough, Steven Pimlott, Katie Mitchell.

In 2007 Alison Chitty RDI OBE was awarded the Misha Black Award for Innovation in Design Education. According to Professor Frank Height, "Misha Black had a powerful belief in the creative interaction of all design disciplines and removed previously perceived barriers in design education. In my opinion, Alison Chitty has taken this belief into her chosen field of design and used it to achieve international recognition for the excellence of the application of the creative process in both traditional and new fields of entertainment and is an exemplar of advanced design education which is being fostered in so many UK institutions".

In December 2010, Alison Chitty and Ashley Martin-Davis announced that they would be leaving at the end of the academic year. The Chairman, John Simpson, announced that the school was facing difficulties in the current political and economic climate and might have to close. In January 2011, the Alumni and Friends of Motley Theatre Design Course formed to support the school through the next testing period in its long history. After a robust campaign, and facing significant pressure, the chairman John Simpson gave a public speech at the opening of the annual student exhibition at the National Theatre, reversing his decision and announcing that he would find a way for the course to continue, saying that he could not "look Percy in the eye if he met her at the pearly gates". To date, Motley Theatre Design Course is still trading, but not running any courses or enabling alumni access to the library assembled by Percy Harris over the course of her teaching career.

== Notable alumni ==
- Jon Bausor
- Alexandra Byrne
- Isabella Bywater
- Kim Carpenter
- Phoebe de Gaye
- Es Devlin
- Maria Djurkovic
- Mini Grey
- Margo Harkin
- Jeremy Herbert
- Gemma Jackson
- Shawn Kerwin
- Anthony Lamble
- Antony McDonald
- Jean-Marc Puissant

== Notable faculty ==
- Michael Attenborough
- Stephen Arlen
- Maria Björnson
- Bill Bryden
- Martin Duncan
- David Eldridge
- William Gaskill
- Margaret Harris
- Jocelyn Herbert
- Sean Holmes
- Jane Howell
- Anthony Lamble (Associate Director 1997-2008)
- Philip Langridge
- Mike Leigh
- Katie Mitchell
- Steven Pimlott
- Lindsay Posner
- Simon Stephens
- Steve Tompkins
- Simon Usher
