= London Theatre Studio =

Drama and design school

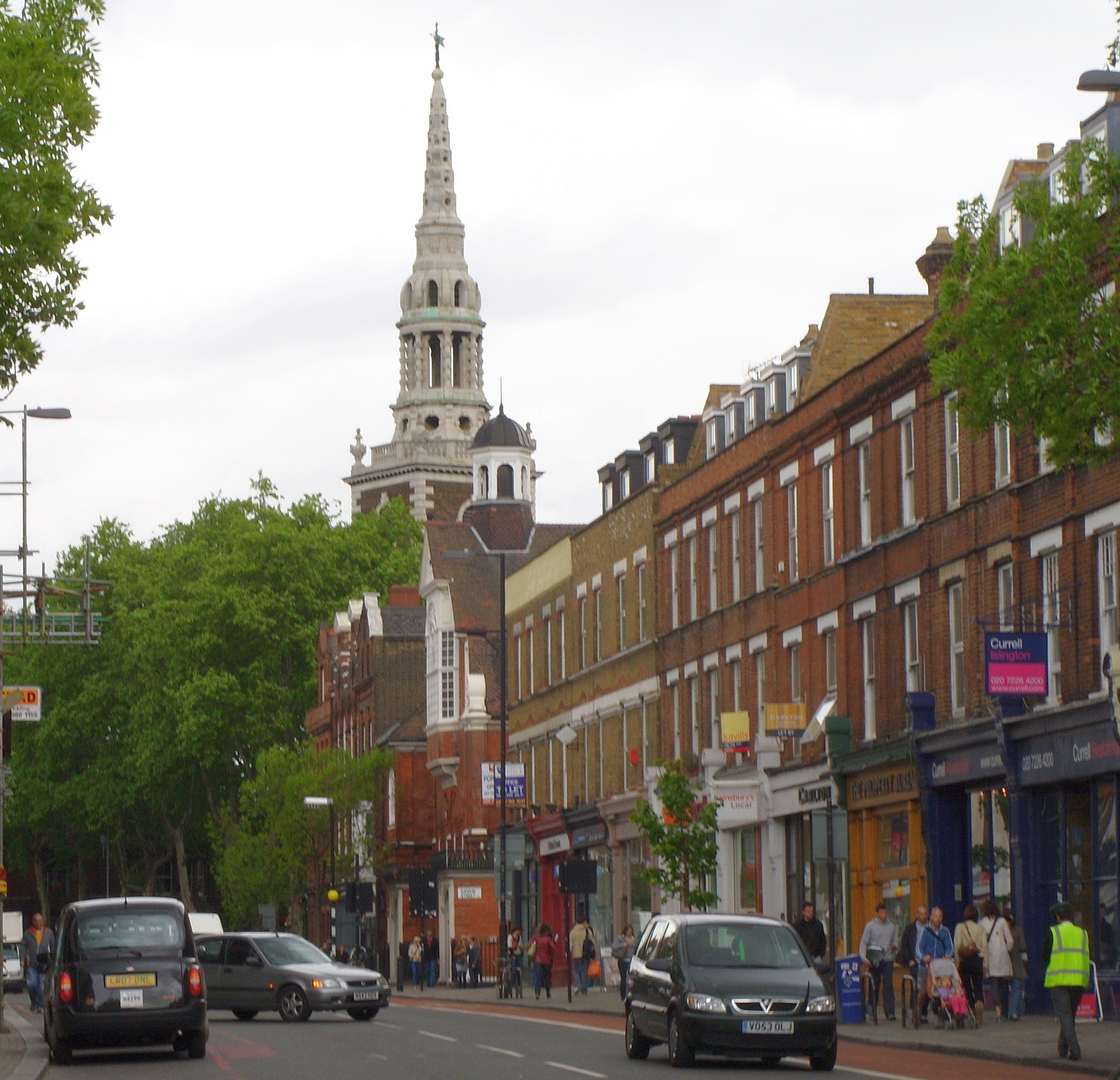
Upper Street, Islington, in 2007

The London Theatre Studio was a drama and design school in Upper Street, Islington, London, from 1936 to 1939. It was directed by the French actor and director Michel Saint-Denis.

The school was the first in England to teach theatrical design as well as drama. It was closed at the beginning of the Second World War, and after the war its director and other instructors returned to teaching drama and design in other places.

== Background ==
In 1929, with the support of Jacques Copeau, his uncle, Michel Saint-Denis and other members of Copeau's company moved to Paris and established the Compagnie des Quinze, a company of actors, in which Saint-Denis put into effect the innovative teaching methods of Copeau. This folded in 1934, and in 1935 Saint-Denis moved to London, where the next year he founded the London Theatre Studio with George Devine, Marius Goring, and Glen Byam Shaw. Margaret Harris later did not know how the money for setting up the school was raised, but speculated that it was with the help of Tyrone Guthrie.

== The school ==
The first classes of the new school were in rooms in Beak Street which had once been used as practice rooms by Serge Diaghilev. As they were small, the students were not all on site at the same time. Then, with financial help from a student named Laura Dyas, a purpose-designed school was created in Providence Hall, a former Strict Baptist chapel in Providence Place, Upper Street, Islington, with a conversion of the building designed by Marcel Breuer and F. R. S. Yorke. Breuer designed the stage and auditorium, and also all the furniture, much of which was in moulded plywood. The contract for the building works was dated July 1936, and for the furniture September 1936. An Oxford friend of Devine, Peter Bayne, was brought in as business manager, and a limited liability company, London Theatre Studio Ltd, was incorporated.

The new school followed the methods of Copeau, as developed further by Saint-Denis, and in its first term had twenty-four students.

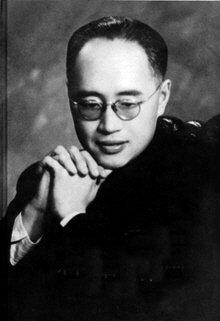
Huang Zuolin

The school's design course was taught by Sophie Harris, Margaret Harris, and Elizabeth Montgomery, who were collectively a unit known as Motley, and Richard Southern taught stage scenery design and its history. This was the first theatrical design course at an English drama school. George Devine was assistant director of the school and taught lighting. Saint-Denis taught directing, and Huang Zuolin was among his students.

While he was in England, Saint-Denis also worked in theatre, including directing productions by the Royal Shakespeare Company. Alec Guinness, Michael Redgrave, John Gielgud, and Laurence Olivier were among those he directed, and Guinness, who was already working as an actor, took classes at the Studio. At this time, there were some sixteen professional actors enrolled as students.

The London Theatre Studio was closed in 1939, as a result of the outbreak of the Second World War. In July 1941, an extraordinary general meeting of London Theatre Studio Ltd decided to wind up the company voluntarily, as it "cannot by reason of its liabilities continue its business".

== Aftermath ==
Saint-Denis stayed in England, and from 1940 to 1944 was the director of Radio Londres, a BBC station broadcasting in French. After the war, he established the Old Vic Theatre School (1947–1952) with George Devine and Glen Byam Shaw. He went on to found a new drama school in Strasbourg in 1954, and in 1960 was an advisor for the creation of the National Theatre School of Canada in Montreal.

Margaret Harris was later a director of the Motley Theatre Design Course, a historian of which has observed that her aims "...hearkened back to the London Theatre Studio ideal of a ‘company’ who work in happy collaboration, rather than a group of individuals in creative competition with each other".

A drama instructor at the school, Oliver Reynolds (1908–1998) was rejected for military service when the London Theatre Studio closed and spent the war years transcribing books into Braille. After the war, he launched his own drama school, before in 1951 joining the staff of the Central School of Speech Training and Dramatic Art.

== Notable staff ==
Sophie Harris

- Michel Saint-Denis (1897–1971), Director
- George Devine (1910–1966), assistant director, lighting tutor
- Marius Goring (1912–1998), Shakespearean acting
- Sophie Harris (1900–1966), design
- Elizabeth Montgomery (1902–1993), design
- Margaret Harris (1904–2000), design
- Richard Southern (1903–1989), stage scenery

== Notable students ==
See also Category:Alumni of the London Theatre Studio

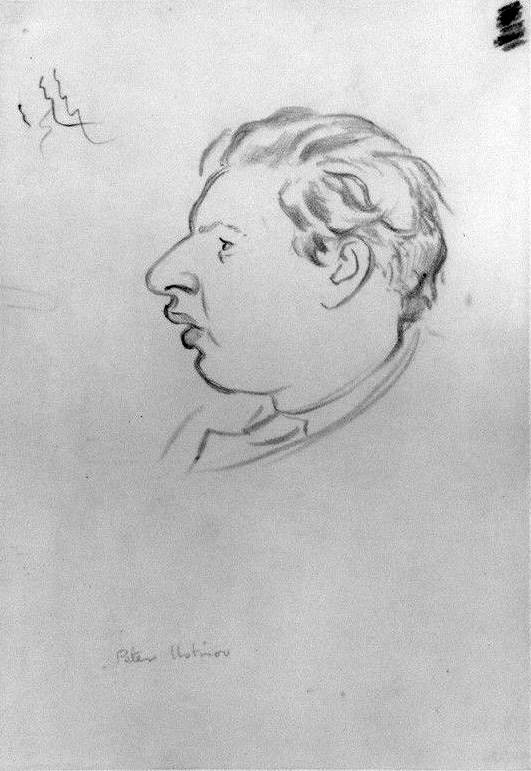
Peter Ustinov

- Huang Zuolin (1906–1994)
- Alec Guinness (1914–2000)
- Yvonne Mitchell (1915–1979)
- James Donald (1917–1993)
- Jocelyn Herbert (1917–2003)
- John Crockett (1918–1986)
- Angelica Garnett (1918–2012)
- Noel Willman (1918–1988)
- Sonia Rolt (1919–2014)
- Peter Ustinov (1921–2004)
- Maria Britneva (1921–1994)
- Maureen Pryor (1922–1977)
