= Voytek (designer) =

Voytek, born Wojciech Roman Pawel Jerzy Szendzikowski (15 January 1925 in Warsaw, Poland – 7 August 2014 in London, United Kingdom), was a leading production designer, for British stage and television, for which he also directed, wrote and produced.

== Career ==
Son of Wladyslaw, a doctor, and Maria Szendzikowski, Wojciech was born and spent his childhood and adolescence in Warsaw. As a teenage partisan during World War 2, he was awarded the Polish Cross of Valour in the Warsaw Uprising of 1944. Sustaining a shoulder wound, he was captured and held as a prisoner of war in Germany. His wartime experience left its mark on the wry humour which infused his later work, a Brechtian political irony focused on class.

After liberation, Voytek walked to Italy, where he joined the exiled Polish army and formed a theatre group. Arriving in Scotland in 1946, he enrolled at Dundee Art College, before joining the Old Vic's Theatre School the following year as a stage design student. There, his primary mentor was Margaret Harris of Motley. The theatre director George Devine suggested 'Voytek' as his professional soubriquet, as 'nobody could pronounce or remember his real name'. After a period in the mask and costume department of London's Arts Theatre, he took an extended contract in repertory at the Nottingham Playhouse as a set and costume designer, where his work attracted attention for its bold, 'metafictional' style: as he put it, 'I believe the Theatre is the essence of reality rather than a mediocre copy of our environment'. He subsequently began designing for television and cinema, where many of his main achievements were to lie.

Over the seven years from 1958 he designed more than 40 Armchair Theatre plays for ABC Television, working with cutting-edge directors such as Philip Saville. He worked on plays featuring many stars of the era including Diana Dors, Patrick Macnee and Leo McKern, with screenplays written by William Saroyan, Michael Meyer and many other young writers. In 1961, he won a Guild of Television Producers and Directors Award for his contribution to the series; while the same year he collected the TV drama design Bafta for The Rose Affair, a modern, styled version of Beauty and the Beast. He also designed several feature films, including Cul-de-sac (1966), directed by Roman Polanski.

Such was his prestige that he made the unusual career move into direction, with credits including episodes of Callan, Man at the Top, The Mind of Mr. J.G. Reeder, The Incredible Adventures of Professor Branestawm, Tales of Mystery and Imagination, (Frankenstein), Crown Court and Special Branch. As a producer, he took charge of the 1967 TV adaptation of Bunyan's Pilgrim's Progress and also wrote several TV scripts.

His later stage work included Ronald Eyre's production of Much Ado About Nothing for the Royal Shakespeare Company in 1971, and The Marquis of Keith by Wedekind (1974, also for the RSC). In 1983 he won a Critics' Circle Theatre Award for best designer, for his set for Botho Strauss's Great and Small at the Vaudeville Theatre, which was set inside a massive plastic tower doubling as a prison cage. He won his second Bafta for production design on the LWT miniseries Dandelion Dead (1994), after which he retired from television work.

== Personal life ==
His first wife was Renee Bergmann, an actor, with whom he had three children, Stefan, Joe and Julie. The marriage ended in divorce in 1971, as did his second marriage to Fionnuala (née Kenny), with whom he had a daughter, Taya.
