= Alison Chitty =

British costume designer

Alison Chitty OBE RDI (born 16 October 1948) is an Olivier Award winning production designer and set and costume designer, known for her collaborations with Mike Leigh, Francesca Zambello, Peter Gill and Sir Peter Hall. She is also the Director of the Motley Theatre Design Course, a successor to Motley Theatre Design Group. Both organisations included Margaret Harris as one of their founders.

She studied at Saint Martin's School of Art and the Central School of Art and Design, and subsequently was resident at the Victoria Theatre, Stoke-on-Trent. She was resident designer at the Royal National Theatre for eight years, and has also designed for English National Opera, Royal Opera House, Santa Fe Opera and many other theatres internationally.

For Mike Leigh she was production designer on Life is Sweet, Naked and Secrets and Lies.

== Awards ==
- 2001 Olivier Award Best Costume Design for Remembrance of Things Past, Royal National Theatre
- 2004 Received OBE
- 2007 Olivier Award Best Costume Design for The Voysey Inheritance, Royal National Theatre
- 2008 Young Vic Award
- 2007 Awarded the Sir Misha Black Award.
- 2009 Elected Royal Designer for Industry.
