= Suzanne Bing =

French actress (1885–1967)

Suzanne Bing (10 March 1885 – 22 November 1967) was a French actress. She was a founding member of Jacques Copeau's Théâtre du Vieux-Colombier in Paris during the first season 1913-14. Later she worked with the troupe in New York from 1917–19 and again in Paris, 1920-24.

== Early life and formative years ==
Suzanne Bing was born in Paris in the 2nd arrondissement. When Bing joined the Vieux-Colombier in 1913, she came to the company with some experience in the artistic circles of Paris.

She married the composer Edgard Varèse on 5 November 1907 after spending two years at the Paris Conservatoire de Musique et de Déclamation where vocal training was more important than acting. She spent several years in Berlin where Varèse tried to make a living. After their daughter, Claude, was born in October 1910, she continued to act in various venues in Paris. But by 1913 Varèse and Bing decided they should pursue their respective careers, and they separated. The marriage was not annulled until 1965.

== At the Vieux-Colombier ==
During the first season of the Vieux-Colombier in Paris, Bing played several important roles, the most critically acclaimed of which was her Viola in an adaptation of Shakespeare's Twelfth Night, (Nuit des rois). When war broke out in August 1914, the second season was cancelled as most of the men either volunteered or were called up for service.

Bing continued her collaboration with Copeau as he pursued his concept for a school for actors where his ideals of respect for the text and an acting style freed of rhetorical flourishes common during the era would be taught to young people drawn to a vocation in the theater. Bing, with her own acting experience and training, was an invaluable source of knowledge and support for Copeau. Their first efforts took place in November 1915 with a group of children ranging in age from six to fourteen years.

Bing worked as an assistant to Copeau during these sessions, sometimes replacing him in his absence. Her ability to work with the youngsters in a relaxed and playful atmosphere contributed to the success of this undertaking and helped Copeau in his understanding of various techniques, such as improvisation and music-based movement, that he would incorporate later into a more elaborate curriculum.

After Copeau was excused from military service because of illness, the professional and intimate lives of Bing and Copeau became increasingly intertwined, as she worked with him to establish some basic guidelines for a school. They collaborated on a translation of Shakespeare's The Winter's Tale, finished in 1916. In March 1917, while Copeau was in New York City for a series of lectures, Bing gave birth to their son, Bernard.

== To New York and back ==
During the two-year stint of the Vieux-Colombier at the Garrick Theatre on 35th Street in New York City, Bing reprised the role of Viola in Nuit des rois, and seven other roles ranging from Elise in Molière's L’Avare to Astolphe in Alfred de Musset's Barberine during the first season and some thirteen roles in the second season, including Cherubin in Le Mariage de Figaro of Beaumarchais, Mélisande in Maurice Maeterlinck's Pelléas et Mélisande, and Mrs. Helseth in Henrik Ibsen's Rosmersholm.

In a review, the magazine The Nation wrote on 29 March 1919: "Suzanne Bing seems to be a flame of inspiration to the group, and one comes to look for her, in however humble a capacity, in almost every performance, ..."

More importantly she continued to collaborate with Copeau on his idea of a school for young actors. She participated in activities at the Children's School founded by Margaret Naumberg, Waldo Frank's wife, who put into practice many of the concepts of Maria Montessori. During the summer of 1918, while the troupe of the Vieux-Colombier was lodged at the New Jersey estate of Otto H. Kahn, she and Marie-Hélène (later Mme Dasté), known as "Maiène", Copeau's oldest child, began to construct masks and work on activities that included movement and masks.

Upon their return to Paris in 1919, Copeau did not immediately re-open the Théâtre du Vieux-Colombier, but the desire to open a school for actors remained ever-present. Again Suzanne Bing played an important role in both areas. The theater began its season with Shakespeare's Winter's Tale on 9 February 1920 in the Copeau/Bing adaptation and acting classes for a group of adults began on 1 March under the direction of Copeau and Bing. When it became obvious that a suitable locale for a theater school was not available, Bing started lessons with youngsters between the ages of fourteen and eighteen the following December in space above the theater. For the next four years, she shared her talents between the theater and her young charges at the École du Vieux-Colombier, which now had its own space several blocks from the theater and a full-blown program of studies.

Although Copeau thought it best to protect his students from the influence of the professional theater, he did allow them to participate to critical acclaim in a production of André Gide's Saul in which they played masked demons. Bing's work with her students was put on display in an adaptation of a Noh play, Katan, which they presented in 1924 before an astonished Copeau and Harley Granville-Barker.

== The "Copiaus" and the Compagnie des Quinze ==
Abruptly at the end of the 1924 season, Copeau disbanded his theater company and, with those actors who were willing and some of the students from the school, moved to Burgundy. Thus began a fascinating saga in the countryside that was to last some five years. The motley group of some thirty-five students and actors first settled in Morteuil and then finally in Pernand-Vergelesse, a village not far from Beaune, deep in the wine-producing area of Burgundy. With the school abandoned because of a lack of funds in 1925, this odd mixture of actors and students, along with Copeau's nephew, Michel Saint-Denis, slowly formed themselves into a troupe that relied on the development of characters of their creation they developed through improvisation and mask work. The concept of a New Comedy that Copeau had developed much earlier during the war years came to fruition here with Bing, Maiène, St-Denis and Jean Dasté, who would soon become Copeau's son-in-law (he married Maiène). The masked characters, reminiscent of the commedia dell'arte, became part of their repertoire as they played in pieces written expressly for them by Copeau or that resulted from their improvisations. As they traveled from village to village putting on their plays in town squares, led by actors in costume and carrying banners, accompanied by drums and music, Burgundians began calling them the "Copiaus". The name soon marked them as progeny of Copeau's concept of the theater—a theater reduced to its essence.

Bing's influence here is not difficult to discern. Her interest in improvisation and masks grew into a devotion both to the development of her former students, Maiène, Jean Dasté, Etienne Decroux, Jean Dorcy, and to the continuation of the concepts of Copeau, the man they all called "patron." As the transition from student actor to professional took place under Bing's aegis, they developed new techniques based on their improvisations and mask work. The result was that the students of the École du Vieux-Colombier became themselves teachers and professional actors devoted to a well-honed craft.

In 1929 this small group left Burgundy for Paris to establish the Compagnie des Quinze, under the direction of Michel Saint-Denis. Their first production, Noé, written for the company by André Obey, was produced on the stage of the Vieux-Colombier in 1931. All the training of the actor's instruments—body and voice—along with the highly developed use of the mask were put on display in this work in which most of the actors played masked animal characters.

== Later life and legacy ==
Although not working directly in the theater under Copeau, Bing continued her collaboration with him on a translation of the tragedies of Shakespeare published in 1939. She, like many theater actors of her generation, tried her hand at the art of the film in Le Calvaire de Cimiez (1934). Illness drained her energies, but not her spirit. Even during World War II, when she was forced to wear the hated star despite her conversion to Catholicism, she maintained her dignity. Although set up in a retirement home, by Copeau in 1947, she continued to work, giving elocution lessons and readings to foreign students at the Sorbonne. The French translations of the comedies of Shakespeare, her last collaboration with Copeau, were published in 1952.

She remained throughout her life the most ardent believer in Copeau's concepts of the theater. Without her it is unlikely that the École du Vieux-Colombier would have achieved its many successes, as can be seen in the influence her students exercised in the world of the theater between the two wars and after. She helped transform the formation of the actor in France—a tradition carried on subsequently by Jacques Lecoq and Ariane Mnouchkine.

Suzanne Bing died 1967 in Neuilly-sur-Seine.
