= Sophie Harris =

English theatre and opera costume and scenic designer

- Sophie Harris
- Born: 2 July 1900; Hayes, Kent, England
- Died: 10 March 1966 (aged 65); Hammersmith, London, England
- Years active: 1932–1966
- Spouse: George Devine (div. 1960)

Audrey Sophia "Sophie" Harris (2 July 1900 – 10 March 1966) was an English award winning theatre and opera costume and scenic designer.

== Biography ==
Born in Hayes, Kent, the third child and first daughter of William Birkbeck Harris, a Lloyds Insurance clerk, and his wife Kathleen Marion Carey. With her younger sister Margaret "Percy" Harris she studied at The Chelsea Illustrators Studio in London. A fellow student was Elizabeth Montgomery, and the three formed a theatre design partnership known as Motley Theatre Design Group. The first full-scale production on which they worked was Romeo and Juliet for the Oxford University Dramatic Society (OUDS), John Gielgud's début as a director. The great success of this led to an invitation from Gielgud to design Gordon Daviot's Richard of Bordeaux, which opened at the New Theatre in St Martins Lane, London, in February 1933. The production was a huge success, achieving cult status, with playgoers queuing round the block every night. It is widely recognised that the success was partly owing to the Motley sets and costumes, which captured the essence of the period in an artistic rather than a slavishly historical sense, and were much admired for their beauty and lightness. This early recognition led to a busy and highly successful decade during which they became Gielgud's regular collaborators, working with him on such productions as his celebrated Romeo and Juliet (1935), in which he alternated the parts of Romeo and Mercutio with Laurence Olivier, and his Hamlet of 1936. They also formed a partnership with the celebrated French director Michel Saint-Denis, whose production of André Obey's Noah, starring Gielgud in the title role, they designed in 1935. Saint Denis went on to found the London Theatre Studio (1936–1939), a radical new theatre school which incorporated courses in theatre design taught by the Motleys. This was the first time theatre design had been taught within a drama school in the UK. In addition to their teaching and theatre work, the Motleys also opened a couture house in 1936, to which Harris made a substantial contribution.

At the outbreak of World War II, Margaret Harris and Elizabeth Montgomery were in the USA, working with Laurence Olivier, and they decided to remain there until the end of the war. Sophie Harris, still in England, married the actor and director George Devine (1910–1966) with whom she formed a relationship after the OUDS Romeo and Juliet. Their daughter Harriet was born in 1942. Working on her own for the first time, Sophie designed several plays and films during this period.

Shortly after Devine's return after the war, he founded The Old Vic Theatre School, together with Saint-Denis and Glen Byam Shaw. Sophie, with Margaret Harris, back from America, taught design and costume at the school. Following the closure of the school in 1952, the Motleys continued to design extensively for both opera (at London's Sadler's Wells Theatre and English National Opera) and theatre. Their work at the Shakespeare Memorial Theatre was much admired throughout the 1950s. Harris also had a successful solo career as a costume designer for films, as well as reviving her couture house under the name Elizabeth Curzon. In the early days of Devine's newly founded English Stage Company at the Royal Court Theatre (founded 1956), the Motleys designed numerous productions. Harris designed the costumes for several Woodfall Films, including Saturday Night and Sunday Morning (1960), A Taste of Honey (1961), The Loneliness of the Long Distance Runner (1962), and This Sporting Life (1963), and for Jack Clayton (The Innocents (1961) and The Pumpkin Eater, for which she won a BAFTA Award for best costume designer. (1963).

Harris was divorced from George Devine in the early 1960s. She continued to work successfully in both theatre and film until her death in March 1966.
