= Hayden Griffin =

Theatre stage designer (1943–2013)

Hayden Griffin (23 January 1943 – 24 March 2013) was a stage designer, known for his work for the Royal Court Theatre and the Royal National Theatre in London. Griffin was "regarded by many as the finest stage designer of his generation".

== Early life ==
He was born on 23 January 1943 in Pietermaritzburg, South Africa. His father flew for the South African Air Force as a Spitfire pilot, and his mother was a cousin of the novelist Alan Paton. He was educated at Maritzburg College, followed by Durban Art School and the Theatre Design Course at Sadler's Wells, London under Margaret Harris in 1966/7.

== Career ==
An Academy and Olivier Award nominated set & costume designer, Griffin's work included Wetherby, Intimacy, Six Characters in Search of An Author (film), and Syrup. As well as the Royal Court Theatre and the Royal National Theatre, he also worked for the Royal Shakespeare Company, Public Theater, Royal Opera House, English National Opera, Metropolitan Opera House, Birmingham Royal Ballet, San Francisco Ballet, Royal Lyceum Theatre and the Teatro Stabile in Genoa.

He was closely associated with Margaret Harris and the Motley Theatre Design Course after arriving in Britain in 1965, firstly as a student on the inaugural year of the course in 1966, and latterly as teacher and co-director. He also taught at the London Film School until the end of his life.

== Personal life ==
Griffin was married twice, firstly to Carol Lawrence, a fellow Motley student, with whom he had three children, and secondly to Fiona Williams, with whom he had a son.

== Death ==
He died from cancer on 24 March 2013, in London, aged 70.
