= Man and Boy: Dada =

2003 opera by Michael Nyman

Man and Boy: Dada is a 2003 opera by Michael Nyman with a libretto by Michael Hastings. It tells the story of a friendship between aging dada artist Kurt Schwitters and a twelve-year-old boy. These two characters and the boy's mother make up the cast of the opera.

It was first performed at the Badisches Staatstheater in Karlsruhe, Germany, on 13 March 2004, directed by Robert Tannenbaum. It was then performed in the UK by the Almeida Opera in July 2004, in a production designed by Jeremy Herbert, directed by Lindsay Posner and conducted by Paul McGrath at the Almeida Theatre.

The opera features an extensive use of oboe (rare in Nyman's work), mostly in the second act, to capture the feel of post-War popular music, somewhat reminiscent of Dmitri Shostakovich's Suite for Variety Orchestra.

== Synopsis ==
Michael is a young boy on a bus who competes with an old man for bus tickets, which they both collect (as did Nyman as a child). The man turns out to be Kurt Schwitters, a dada artist who escaped Germany, although his wife has been killed and his son missing, and is facing deportation. They get to talking about their collections. Schwitters invites Michael to come to his apartment to see them. Michael refuses for obvious reasons, but asks what he does with them, and is told about merz collages.

Michael lives with his mother. His father was a night watchman whose body was never found when his building was struck by a German doodlebug bomb. Although Michael's mother hates all Germans, she makes an exception for the artist, who gradually earns her trust. Michael and Kurt go to the British Museum together and deface a lion statue in a dada manner.

Michael's mother won't allow Kurt to visit while he is sick, and he gets interviewed by a BBC newswoman who likes to hear herself talk and makes sure that her pontifications get more air time than Kurt's corrections. She ends the interview by referring to dada as "dadaISM," with heavy emphasis on the "ism", and goes on quite a pace about Schwitters's references to his "art" rather than "anti-art", as the proponents of dada would have it.

Kurt spends more time with Michael and his mother. He repeatedly suggests that the two get married so that he can become a naturalized citizen, but she is not interested in him that way. He makes numerous mistakes. He offends her with a song about doodlebug bomb, but she agrees to hear it again, as the song was not at all intended to make fun of her husband. He makes a very large mistake at Michael's birthday. Michael wants a bicycle, but Kurt gives him a dada bike that cannot be ridden. Michael's mother is horrified that he would do what she perceives as a practical joke to a boy. His motivation was completely different—he wanted to give Michael something special and unique. Kurt decides that he is too eccentric to get on with Michael and his mother. Michael tries to persuade him to stay, telling him that he appreciates the dada bike and can say to his friends that he crashed it.

== Recording ==
Man and Boy: Dada an opera in two acts

Studio album by Michael Nyman
- Released: 1 June, 2005 (UK); July 29, 2008 (United States)
- Recorded: October and November 2004
- Genre: opera, contemporary classical
- Length: Disc 1: 42:27; Disc 2: 62:23
- Language: English; German
- Label: MN Records
- Producer: Michael Nyman

Michael Nyman chronology
The Actors (2003)	Man and Boy: Dada an opera in two acts (2005)	The Piano Sings (2005)

The album, based on the Almeida production, was recorded in 2004 and released in 2005. It was the first release on Nyman's own label, MN Records, and his 48th release overall.

=== Track listing ===
Disc 1 – ACT ONE

1. SCENE 1 – You need a ticket to breathe the air
2. SCENE 2 – A few things I collect beside bus tickets
3. SCENE 3 – Any more fares please?
4. SCENE 4 – It's kind of interesting rubbish
5. SCENE 5 – Scarper!
6. SCENE 6 – Forty sheep and twenty reindeer?
7. SCENE 7 – Coughs and sneezes spread diseases
8. SCENE 8 – Except take a piss
9. SCENE 9 – Doodlebug

Disc 2 – ACT TWO

1. SCENE 10 – A Famous cup of British tea
2. SCENE 11 – This was a good one – Ponders End to Waterloo
3. SCENE 12 – I'm highly adept at the tango
4. SCENE 13 – Show me a bike!
5. SCENE 14 – Chuk persh szing!
6. SCENE 15 – Happy birthday, dear Michael!
7. SCENE 16 – I am having a trouble with hanky panky
8. SCENE 17 – Latin à la Hammersmith Palais
9. SCENE 18 – A hundred stops but they have no name
10. SCENE 19 – I was trying to explain something about Dada

=== Cast ===
- John Graham-Hall (tenor): Kurt Schwitters
- William Sheldon (boy soprano): Michael
- Vivian Tierney (soprano): Michael's mother/old woman/bus conductress/British Museum guard/BBC interviewer

=== Musicians ===
Michael Nyman Band

- conducted by Paul McGrath
- Gabrielle Lester, violin
- Rebecca Hirsch, violin
- Tony Hinnigan, cello
- Paul Morgan, double bass
- Melinda Maxwell, oboe
- Gareth Hulse, oboe
- Andrew Sparling, clarinet, bass clarinet
- David Rix, clarinet, bass clarinet
- David Roach, soprano, alto saxophone
- Christopher Gunia, bassoon
- Richard Benjafield, percussion
- Dominic Saunders, piano

=== Crew ===
- Composed and produced by Michael Nyman
- Recorded, edited and mixed by Austin Ince at Abbey Road Studios, London, October and November 2004.
- Assistant engineer: Roland Heap
- Assistant to Michael Nyman: Andy Keenan
- Mastered by Peter Mew at Abbey Road Studios, December 2004
- Music published by Chester Music Ltd./Michael Nyman Ltd., 2004
- Libretto © Michael Hastings, 2004
- (The librettist gratefully acknowledges contributions and alterations to the text by Victoria Hardie)
- Designed by Russell Mills (shed)
- Co-designed by Michael Webster (storm)
- Portrait of Kurt Schwitters, '1924', photographer, Eli Lissitsky (courtesy of the Sprengel Museum, Hanover)
- Kurt Schwitters, Gerd Strindberg and Edith Thomas (?) in the garden of the house in Barnes, London, 1941/1943 photographer: Kurt and Ernest Scwitters Stiftung, Hanover
- Production photos by Michael Nyman
- Design imagery by Jeremy Herbert and Steven Williams
- Special thanks to Elizabeth Lloyd, Rachel Thomas, John Fosbrook, Gill Graham, James Rushton, Nicholas Hare, James Ware, Declan Colgan, Robert Tannenbaum, Achim Thorwald, Patrick Dickie, Phillippa Cole, Jeremy Herbert, Lindsay Posner, Sarah Wilson, Jeremy Bines, Alexander Balanescu, Annette Gentz, Colette Barber & Lucy Launder at Abbey Road, Karin Orchard at the Kurt Schwitters Archiv, Sprengel Museum, Hanover
