= Elizabeth Wilmot =

Elizabeth Wilmot may refer to:

- Elizabeth Montgomery (designer), married name Elizabeth Wilmot (1902–1993), English theatre and opera costume and scenic designer
- Elizabeth Wilmot, Countess of Rochester (1651–1681), English heiress
