= Jocelyn Herbert =

British artist and stage designer (1917–2003)

- Born: 22 February 1917; London, England
- Died: 6 May 2003 (aged 86); Long Sutton, Hampshire, England, UK
- Education: Slade School of Art
- Occupation: Stage designer
- Notable work: Collaborations with Samuel Beckett; contributed to the design of the National Theatre, London
- Spouse: Anthony Baruh Lousada (m. 1937; div. 1960)
- Partner: George Devine
- Children: 4
- Parent: A. P. Herbert (father)

Jocelyn Herbert RDI (22 February 1917 – 6 May 2003) was a British stage designer.

== Early life ==
Born in London the second of the four children of playwright, novelist, humorist and parliamentarian A. P. Herbert (1890–1971), through her father she had contact with artists, writers and stage people. She began her artistic training in Paris under the painter André Lhote (1885–1962). She then continued her education at the Slade School of Art, London where she trained in theatre design before joining the London Theatre Studio in 1936 where her theatre designs were used in the Studio's theatrical experiments. It was here that she was taught by Margaret Harris and Sophie Harris of the Motley Theatre Design Group. World War II (1939–45) interrupted this final stage of training, leading Herbert to concentrate on her family life.

== The Royal Court Theatre and George Devine ==
Herbert's professional career began in 1956 when she joined George Devine's English Stage Company. Devine was a theatrical manager, director, teacher and actor. The Company was based at The Royal Court Theatre, London. Her first production was Eugène Ionesco's (1909–1994) play The Chairs. The Court attracted a hub of writers and Herbert worked on new material by the playwrights John Arden, Arnold Wesker, John Osborne, Samuel Beckett and David Storey. It was also at the Court that she first collaborated with the directors Lindsay Anderson, John Dexter and Tony Richardson.

== The National Theatre and Sir Laurence Olivier ==
Herbert then moved on to the National Theatre under the director, actor and producer Laurence Olivier (1907–89) at the Old Vic, an association that led to her being invited by Olivier to join the Committee planning the National's new building on London's South Bank (opened 1976) and over which she exerted considerable influence on the shaping of the auditoria. It was at the National that Herbert first collaborated with the playwright Tony Harrison on his translation of The Oresteia (1980) which also played in the amphitheatre at Epidaurus, Greece. This was the beginning of a rich partnership with Harrison which went on to span both a series of theatre projects and also the Channel 4 film, Prometheus (1998). A rare sympathy grew between Harrison and Herbert to the extent that the boundaries between script and design became fluid.

== Influence and style ==
Herbert's designs were characterised by simplicity to draw attention to the actors and the writing. The use of sparse structures, visible rigging, gauzes, arches and shadows were employed to create ambience rather than realism. Herbert created acting spaces on stage by using lighting that highlighted different areas of the stage. Herbert fostered an artistic policy of close collaboration with script and playwrights and directors; Devine championed this method of collaborative working at the Court. She was influential in set design, as prior to her the trend was for sumptuous sets that recreated a room/place rather than a mood or atmosphere. Her tryptic working methods brought the designer, directors and authors of plays and productions closer together. Among Herbert's productions were: The Kitchen, Happy Days and Home (starring Ralph Richardson and John Gielgud) at the Royal Court; Laurence Olivier's Othello and Early Days (starring Ralph Richardson) at the National Theatre, London; The Seagull (starring Vanessa Redgrave and Peggy Ashcroft) in the West End, London. From 1967 she also designed for the opera. Herbert's first design for opera was for Sadler's Wells. She later worked at the Paris Opera House and the Metropolitan Opera, New York. Her New York production of Berg's Lulu in 1977, in collaboration with director John Dexter, was so acclaimed that it was still in the repertoire as late as 2010, and has been preserved on DVD. Her last opera was Harrison Birtwistle's The Mask of Orpheus at the Coliseum in 1986.

== Cinema work ==
In addition to stage work Herbert also designed for the cinema, where she worked as production or costume designer. Her film work began in 1963 with Tony Richardson's Tom Jones and she worked with him again on Ned Kelly (1970) and The Hotel New Hampshire (1984). For Karel Reisz she designed Isadora (1968), and films with Lindsay Anderson included If.... (1968), O Lucky Man! (1973) and The Whales of August (1987).

== Personal life ==
Herbert had one marriage, to the arts administrator Anthony Baruh Lousada. They had four children. The family were neighbours of George and Sophie Devine, on Lower Mall in Hammersmith, London. A love affair developed between Jocelyn and George – love letters were discovered by George's daughter Harriet -- and in due course they moved to Rossetti Studios in Flood Street, Chelsea, together. They never married, but Devine willed his estate to her. Herbert and Lousada divorced in 1960. She died on 6 May 2003, in Long Sutton, Hampshire.

== Herbert's legacy ==
The Jocelyn Herbert Award was established after her death and was given until 2007 by the Linbury Trust and by Jocelyn Herbert's family (in 2009 it was given by the Jocelyn Herbert Archive at Wimbledon College of Art and sponsored by the Rootstein Hopkins Foundation) to the candidate epitomising her belief in theatre. The successful candidate needs to have:

- A genuine interest in all aspects of theatre and belief in the importance of the collaborative effort needed to make the resulting work at its best, in short a passion for the art of theatre.
- An exciting imagination and the artistic skill to visually demonstrate their ideas clearly.
- A respect and feeling for the original work being designed – text or music.
- A strength of personality and determination to see the work process through to the end.
- A desire for further study, time or simply some space to develop their ideas or missing knowledge.

These qualities reflect Herbert's own words about design: "For me, there seems no right way to design a play, only, perhaps, a right approach. One of respecting the text, past or present, and not using it as a peg to advertise your skills, whatever they may be, nor to work out your psychological hang-ups with some fashionable gimmick."
