= Alexander Devine =

British educator and activist for Montenegrin independence (1865–1930)

Alexander Devine (19 December 1865 — 26 December 1930), often known as Lex Devine, was a British educator and activist for Montenegrin independence.

He became involved in social work at an early point, founding the Hugh Oldman Lads' Club Movement in 1887. He was an advocate for public school reform, and, in 1896, founded Clayesmore School in Middlesex. The school would move in 1933 to Dorset due to them purchasing a large plot of land from Thomas Henry Ismay shortly after his Death.

He was a special correspondent for the Daily Chronicle covering the 1906 Summer Olympics in Athens, and the First Balkan War.

During the First World War, he organised relief for Montenegro and for Montenegrin refugees, in 1920 serving as Chairman of the British Relief Committee to Montenegro. He had a strong interest in Tribes of Montenegro, and published a number of books on the subject; he was at one point Honorary Minister for Montenegro in London.

== Family ==
He was the uncle of George Devine, the actor, theatre director, and founder of the English Stage Company.

== Books ==
- A crisis in the education of the governing classes of England (1910)
- A sympathetic boyhood: the public schools and social questions (1913)
- The boys' prayer book (1913)
- Montenegro in history, politics and war (1918)
- A new educational era (1919)
- A few facts concerning the intrigue against Montenegro (1919)
- The mystery of Montenegro (1920)
- Scuttlers and Scuttling: Their Prevention and Cure. (Manchester, 1890).
- British prestige in the Balkans. Montenegro and Serbia (192)
- Off the map: the story of the suppression of Montenegro: the tragedy of a small nation, Chapman & Hall, Henrietta Street, London, W.C (1921)
- The Martyred Nation, a plea for Montenegro, London, (1924) (pps. 43).
- The arrest of Stephen Raditch (1925)
- Abyssinia: her history and claims to the holy places of Jerusalem (1926)
