= Anthony Baruh Lousada =

British solicitor, artist and administrator

Sir Anthony Baruh Lousada (4 November 1907 – 24 June 1994) was a British solicitor, artist and Arts administrator.

He was born in Paddington to Julian George Lousada, a solicitor and art collector, and a member of a prominent Anglo-Sephardi family. He was educated at Westminster School and New College, Oxford.

He was admitted as a solicitor in 1933 and from 1935 to 1973 was a partner in the family firm of Stephenson Harwood & Tatham. During the Second World War he worked in the Ministry of Economic Warfare and at the War cabinet.

He was a distinguished Arts administrator, and served as Vice-Chairman of the Contemporary_Art_Society from 1961 to 1971, a trustee (1962 to 1969) and then Chairman of Trustees from 1972 to 1979 of the Tate Gallery. He was Chairman of the Royal College of Arts from 1972 to 1979 and then Chairman of the Advisory Committee of the Governments Art Collection from 1976 to 1993. He also held exhibitions of his own paintings, which were mostly landscape watercolours and oils. For his services to the Arts he was knighted in the 1975 Birthday Honours.

He married twice. His first wife was the stage designer Jocelyn Herbert, the daughter of Sir A.P. Herbert, MP, with whom he had a son and three daughters. After they divorced in 1960 he married dancer Patricia McBride and had a further son and daughter.
