= George Devine =

English theatrical manager, director, teacher and actor (1910–1966)

George Devine CBE
- Born: 20 November 1910; London, England
- Died: 20 January 1966 (aged 55); London, England
- Education: Clayesmore School; Wadham College, Oxford (did not graduate)
- Occupations: Theatrical producer, manager, actor
- Known for: Founding Old Vic Theatre School and Royal Court Theatre
- Spouse: Sophie Harris (m. 1939, divorced)
- Partner: Jocelyn Herbert
- Children: 1
- Relatives: Alexander Devine (uncle)
- Military career
- Allegiance: United Kingdom
- Branch: British Army; Royal Artillery
- Service years: 1941-1945
- Rank: Captain
- Conflicts: World War II; Burma campaign

George Alexander Cassady Devine CBE (20 November 1910 – 20 January 1966) was an English theatrical manager, director, teacher, and actor based in London from the early 1930s until his death. He also worked in TV and film.

== Early life and education ==
Devine was born in Hendon, London to Georgios Devine (son of an Irish father and a Greek mother) and a Canadian mother, Ruth Eleanor Cassady (from Vancouver). His father was a clerk in Martins Bank.

Ruth Devine became mentally unstable after her son's birth, and his parents' marriage, deeply unhappy throughout his early childhood, had broken down by the time he was in his early teens. Around this time he was sent to Clayesmore School, an independent boys' boarding school founded by his uncle Alexander "Lex" Devine, who took his nephew under his wing hoping that he would take over the running of the school. In 1929, Devine went to Oxford University to read for a degree in history at Wadham College.

It was at Oxford that his interest in theatre, which had begun at school, came to fruition, and in 1931 he became president of the prestigious Oxford University Dramatic Society, or OUDS. In early 1932, he invited the young actor John Gielgud to direct a production of Romeo and Juliet and, as the OUDS did not admit women, invited Peggy Ashcroft and Edith Evans to play Juliet and the Nurse. Gielgud insisted on having the costumes designed by Motley, a newly formed theatre-design team consisting of sisters Sophie and Margaret Harris as well as Elizabeth Montgomery.

The great success of the production encouraged Devine to abandon his degree before sitting his finals and move to London to begin an acting career. He also worked for Motley as their business manager.

== Pre-war years ==
Although Devine managed to get some work as an actor, both at the Old Vic and for John Gielgud (whose directing career had taken off after the OUDS Romeo and Juliet), he was initially not a great success. Rather overweight, dark and foreign-looking, he did not fit the conventional stereotype and tended to play relatively small character parts. Always interested in France (he spoke the language perfectly) and in French theatre, he suggested to Gielgud that they should invite the French director Michel Saint-Denis to London in 1935 to direct a version of his successful production of Andre Obey's Noé.

This proved to be the beginning of a close and fruitful partnership between the two men. Saint-Denis remained in London and, together with Devine and their friends Marius Goring and Glen Byam Shaw, founded the London Theatre Studio in 1936, which offered training not only to actors and directors but also to stage designers. Run by Motley, this was the first course in Britain to offer training in set and costume design. Jocelyn Herbert, who was later to become part of Devine's life, was a student on the course.

At the end of the 1930s Devine finally got the chance to direct a play himself. His first professional production was an adaptation by Alec Guinness of Charles Dickens' novel Great Expectations, which played at the Queen's Theatre in 1939, with Guinness as Herbert Pocket and Martita Hunt as Miss Havisham; David Lean saw this and later acknowledged that it "exerted a tremendous influence" on his celebrated 1946 film. Devine also directed a successful production of a stage version of Daphne du Maurier's Rebecca at the Queen's Theatre in 1939.

== Wartime ==
When the Second World War broke out in September 1939, Devine did not initially expect to be called up, owing to a supposedly weak heart. He did, however, pass his army medical and went into basic training with the Royal Artillery at the end of 1941. After a period of relative inactivity in India, he was transferred to Burma where he spent the final part of the war engaged in jungle warfare. He attained the rank of captain and was twice mentioned in despatches.

== Post-war years and Old Vic Theatre School ==
Devine returned to England in 1946, and in September of that year appeared as George Antrobus in Laurence Olivier's production of Thornton Wilder's The Skin of Our Teeth, also starring Vivien Leigh, at the Piccadilly Theatre in London. Soon afterwards, together with Saint-Denis and Byam Shaw, and under the auspices of the Old Vic, he opened the Old Vic Theatre School in Thurlow Park Road, Dulwich, London, to continue the training courses begun at the London Theatre Studio before the war. At the same time he formed the Young Vic Theatre Company, which was intended to bring theatre to young people. The school ran successfully for several years, training actors such as Prunella Scales, Joan Plowright and Patrick Wymark.

In 1952, the three directors were forced to resign following a dispute with the Old Vic governors, and Devine embarked on a free-lance career as a director and actor. Byam Shaw had moved to Stratford-upon-Avon to run the Shakespeare Memorial Theatre, and Devine directed several successful Shakespeare productions there in the early 1950s, including a notorious version of King Lear (1955), which starred John Gielgud and was designed by the experimental Japanese American artist and sculptor Isamu Noguchi. He also directed several operas at Sadler's Wells Theatre in London, and appeared in several films.

== Royal Court Theatre ==
In 1952 the young director Tony Richardson cast Devine in a television adaptation of "Curtain Down", a short story by Anton Chekhov. There soon developed what Devine came to call their "great friendship". Not long afterwards, together with Richardson's friend and partner the American sociologist George Goetschius, they formed a plan for a radical new theatre company, the objective of which, as Devine wrote later, "was to get writers, writers of serious pretensions, back into the theatre", and thus to make the theatre "part of the intellectual life of the country". The fulfilment of these goals led to the formation in 1955 of what was called the English Stage Company. They acquired the rental of the Royal Court Theatre in Sloane Square, London, and Devine placed an advertisement in the Stage asking for new plays. The Royal Court opened in April 1956 with a production of Angus Wilson's play The Mulberry Bush, followed by Arthur Miller's The Crucible, in which Devine played Governor Danforth as well as directing. It was not until the third production, John Osborne's Look Back in Anger, that the theatre really attracted public attention. Although the play was badly reviewed by traditional theatre critics such as Milton Shulman and Philip Hope-Wallace, glowing reviews from the two Sunday critics Kenneth Tynan and Harold Hobson ensured that the play eventually became a hit.

Under Devine's direction the English Stage Company remained primarily a writers' theatre, nurturing new talents such as Arnold Wesker, Ann Jellicoe, Edward Bond, Donald Howarth, Keith Johnstone, and many others. Devine's policy of taking on young directors as assistants produced some notable talents including William Gaskill, John Dexter, Lindsay Anderson, Anthony Page, and Peter Gill. Devine was also interested in continental drama. He staged several plays by Eugène Ionesco, including a celebrated production of The Chairs, in which he appeared with Joan Plowright. He also greatly admired Samuel Beckett, several of whose plays were produced at the Royal Court, including Endgame in which Devine played Hamm.

Several more of John Osborne's plays were staged at the Royal Court and George Devine appeared in one, the historical drama A Patriot for Me, when he suffered a second heart attack followed soon afterwards by a stroke that eventually led to his death at the age of 55. He had begun to draft an autobiography, which included these words:

I was not strictly after a popular theatre à la Joan Littlewood-Roger Planchon, but a theatre that would be part of the intellectual life of the country. In this respect I consider I utterly failed. I feel I have the right to talk in this proprietary way about the English Stage Company to which I gave nine years of my life and nearly died in the tenth. I was convinced the way to achieve my objective was to get writers, writers of serious pretensions, back into the theatre. This I set out to do. I wanted to change the attitude of the public towards the theatre. All I did was to change the attitude of the theatre towards the public.

== Personal life and death ==
Following their meeting in 1932, Devine and Sophie Harris formed a relationship, and he moved in with her in London after he left Oxford. They married in October 1939, and their daughter Harriet was born in September 1942, after Devine had embarked for India. The marriage ended in the late 1950s, when Devine began living with Jocelyn Herbert, with whom he remained until his death.

He was awarded the CBE in the 1957 Birthday Honours for services to the Theatre. Devine was appearing in A Patriot for Me when he suffered the heart attack that led to his death on 20 January 1966 at age 55.

== Legacy and commemoration ==
The George Devine Award for Most Promising Playwright is named in his honour.

In 1992, English Heritage erected a blue plaque at 9 Lower Mall, Chiswick, London, commemorating Devine, a former resident of the property.

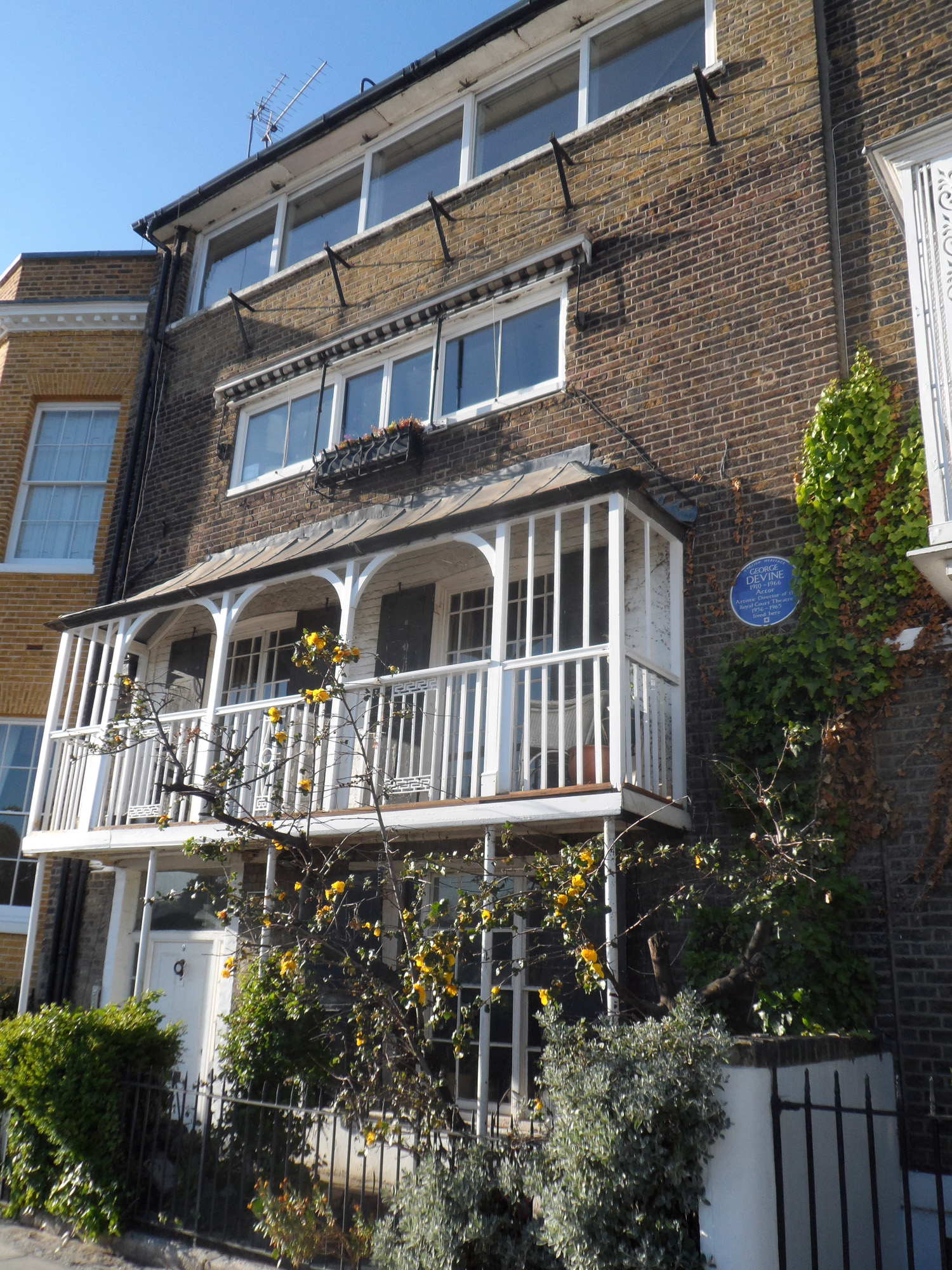
9 Lower Mall, Chiswick, London

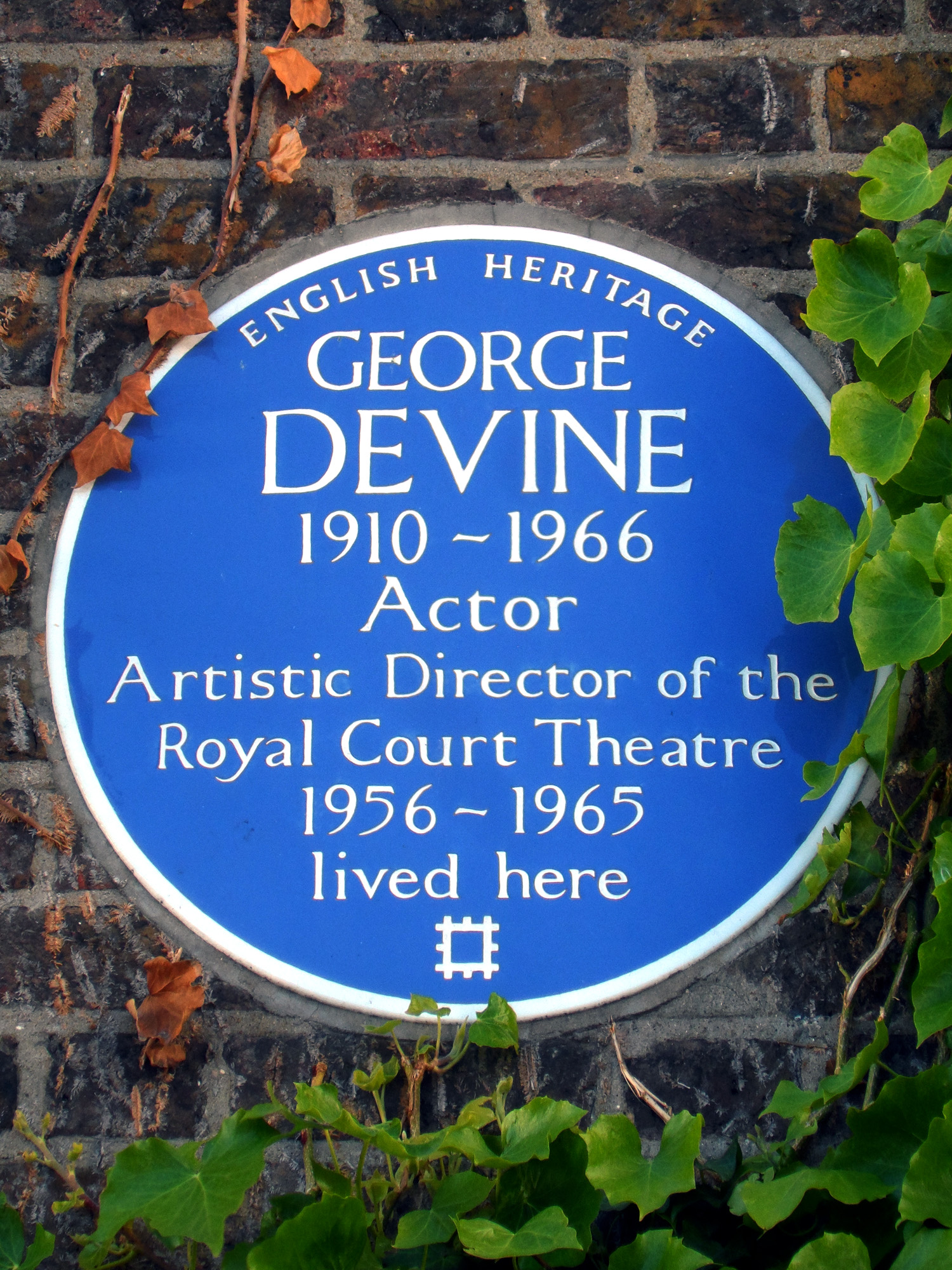
A close-up shot of the blue plaque commemorating George Devine.

== Filmography ==
Year	Title	Role	Notes
1939	The Silent Battle	Sonneman	
1952	The Card	Mr. H. Calvert	
1953	The Beggar's Opera	Peachum	
1954	The Million Pound Note	Chop House Proprietor	
1957	Time Without Pity	Barnes – the Editor	
1959	Look Back in Anger	Doctor	
1963	Tom Jones	Squire Allworthy	
