= Paul McGrath (conductor) =

British conductor and television personality

Paul McGrath (born 14 May 1964) is a British conductor and television personality best known for his involvement with prominent contemporary composers such as Jonathan Dove, Julian Grant, Michael Nyman and Judith Weir and for his role as a mentor in the BBC series A Maestro at the Opera. He is the Director of Music at the University of Warwick.

== Life and career ==
McGrath was born Bromley, Kent and educated at The King's School, Canterbury, the University of Bristol, the National Opera Studio and the Royal Northern College of Music, where he held the Junior Conductor Fellow.

After working as an assistant to Sir Georg Solti at the Royal Opera House, Covent Garden, he made his professional debut at the Batignano Festival in L'ajo nell'imbarazzo. He became Conductor-in-Association at the Royal Liverpool Philharmonic in 1995. His BBC Proms début came in the summer of 1997 when he conducted Deborah Warner's staging of Arthur Honegger's Jeanne d'Arc au bûcher alongside Libor Pešek.

For Jonathan Dove, Paul McGrath has conducted the world premieres of Siren Song at the Almeida Theatre in 1994 and Airport Scenes at the University of Warwick; and the Belgian Premiere of Flight at De Vlaamse Opera in 2002.

For Michael Nyman, Paul McGrath has conducted the British and US premieres of Man and Boy: Dada and the British and Italian premieres of Love Counts. He conducted the recordings of both of these opera for Michael Nyman Records. He also conducted the world premiere of Nyman's film score for Battleship Potemkin on 19 October 2011. He conducted the world premiere of Nyman's new cello concerto, A Sad Pavanne for these Distracted Times, and the Italian premiere of A Dance he Little Thinks Of in Catania in 2011.
