= Mozart 252 =

- photograph by Michael Nyman design by Russell Mills and Storm Clarke-Webster

Studio album in tribute to Wolfgang Amadeus Mozart by Michael Nyman
- Released: 3 March 2008 (UK); 27 May 2008 (United States)
- Recorded: 14–15 April 2005 (Abbey Road Studios); 29 November 2005, 27 April 2006 (Angel Recording Studios); 14 July 2006 (Olympic Studios)
- Genre: Contemporary classical music, minimalist music, film music. opera recital
- Length: 50:28
- Language: English
- Label: MN Records
- Director: Michael Nyman
- Producer: Michael Nyman

Michael Nyman chronology
Love Counts (2007)	Mozart 252 (2008)	8 Lust Songs: I Sonetti Lussuriosi (2008)

Professional ratings
Review scores
Source	Rating
The Times	4/5 stars

Mozart 252 is a 2008 album by Michael Nyman (his 58th release) with the Michael Nyman Band, Hilary Summers, and Andrew Slater, celebrating the 250th anniversary of Wolfgang Amadeus Mozart's birth. Although "Revisiting the Don," one of only two newly written works on the album, was commissioned and performed in 2006, the album's title is a joke on its lateness as an album, released 252 years after Mozart's birth ("it seemed more appropriate to miss the beat by two years"). The album also includes "In Re Don Giovanni," Nyman's first composition for the band, which is based on the first fifteen bars of "Madamina, il catalogo è questo" from Don Giovanni, six selections from Peter Greenaway's film, Drowning by Numbers, in which he was instructed to base the music on the slow movement of Mozart's Sinfonia Concertante K. 364, and two duets and an aria from Nyman's television opera, Letters, Riddles and Writs, in this recording featuring bass Andrew Slater as Leopold Mozart and contralto Hilary Summers as Wolfgang.

The album appears on emusic's list of The Best Albums of 2008.

== The music ==
Nyman's liner notes are relatively brief and refer the reader to Pwyll ap Siôn's The Music of Michael Nyman: Texts, Contexts and Intertexts for an extensive analysis of the relationship of Mozart's music to Nyman's. Nyman notes that "Not Knowing the Ropes" is the piece erroneously titled "Knowing the Ropes" on the original Drowning by Numbers soundtrack. The piece "Knowing the Ropes" is a sort of "list" in the way that "Trysting Fields" is a list, but he is unclear on the relationship of the two pieces, which are similar to one another. "Trysting Fields" is built out of every appoggiatura from the movement in order (each repeated three times), and ends with a bit of "rock and roll". "Knowing the Ropes" is based on a "wiggly" semiquaver in the piece.

"O my Dear Papa" (also referred to as "O My Dear Son") is translations of letters between Wolfgang and Leopold by Emily Anderson and "I Am an Unusual Thing" her translation of a riddle and a reported conversation with Constanze Mozart, while the text of "Profit and Loss", describing Mozart's earnings and expenses, is written by Jeremy Newson, co-librettist and director of the television opera. "O My Dear Son" is based on "O Osiris und Isis" from Die Zauberflöte, and "I Am an Unusual Thing" draws music from Mozart's "Haydn Quartets," while "Profit and Loss" overlays "In Re Don Giovanni" and then goes in a darker direction based on the same material.

== Track listing ==
1. "In Re Don Giovanni"
2. "Revisiting the Don"
3. "Trysting Fields"
4. "Not Knowing the Ropes" [otherwise known as "2M6"]
5. "Wedding Tango"
6. "Wheelbarrow Walk"
7. "Fish Beach"
8. "Knowing the Ropes"
9. "O my Dear Papa"
10. "I am an Unusual Thing"
11. "Profit and Loss"

== Personnel ==
- Music composed, directed and produced by Michael Nyman
- Recorded, edited and mixed by Austin Ince

Performed by the Michael Nyman Band

- Michael Nyman, Simon Chamberlain, piano
- Ian Humphries, violin
- Gabrielle Lester, violin
- Catherine Thompson, violin
- Kate Musker, viola
- Tony Hinnigan, cello
- Martin Elliott, bass guitar
- David Roach, soprano and alto sax
- Simon Haram, soprano and alto sax
- Andrew Findon, baritone sax, flute, piccolo
- Nigel Gomm, trumpet
- Steve Sidwell, trumpet
- Nigel Barr, bass trombone, euphonium
- Hilary Summers, contralto
- Andrew Slater, bass
- Assistant engineers:
  - Abbey Road Studios 2: Alex Scannell
  - Angel Recording Studios 3: James Stone
- Olympic Studios 1: Philippe Rose
- Mixed at Olympic Studios 28, 29 August 2007
  - Assistant: Dave Emery
- Mastered by Austin Ince at Pentland Studio
- Special thanks to Nigel Barr, Lucy Bright, Jane Carter, Viviana D'Ambrosio, Rowan Drury, Annette Morreau, Jeremy Newson, Wolfgang Amadeus Mozart
- Design by Russell Mills (shed)
- Co-design Storm Clarke-Webster (Bryanston)
- Cover photography by Michael Nyman
