= Love Counts =

2005 opera by Michael Nymann and Michael Hastings

Love Counts is a 2005 opera in two acts by Michael Nyman to a libretto by Michael Hastings.

== Performance history ==
The opera premiered 12 March 2005 at the Badisches Staatstheater Karlsruhe, Germany, directed by Robert Tannenbaum. It was performed in London at the Almeida Theatre on 14 July 2006, directed by Lindsay Posner, designed by Peter McKintosh, and conducted by Paul McGrath.

== Roles ==
Role	Voice type	Premiere cast, 12 March 2005
Avril	soprano	
Patsy	bass	

== Synopsis ==
The opera begins with Patsy Bear (spelled Bear in the libretto but spelled Blair in the character list), a middleweight boxer, punching leaves on a tree. Avril Ainger, a mathematics lecturer, encounters him while riding her bicycle and they have a conversation. The next day, Avril passes by the gym where Patsy fights. His manager has dropped him. He is waiting for the bus, but when the driver arrives, he will not tell Patsy the number, for Patsy is illiterate and has difficulty even recognizing numbers. She accompanies him back to his hut and they learn more about each other, Patsy's limitations, and the hurt of Avril's first marriage. They go to a restaurant, and Avril tries to help Patsy with the bill, but he is typically one to walk off without paying.

She begins teaching him basic mathematics, starting with familiarizing him with all the digits, but he only wants to have sex.

The second act is set mostly in Avril's bedroom, jumping backward and forward in time, often with the characters changing clothes in front of the audience.

Avril asks Patsy about the nature of his erections because her previous husband could get them only if he hit her. After they have sex for the first time, Patsy's manager calls and tells him that a new lad wants him to be his trainer.

The lessons continue, and Nyman uses a found number system based on Albert Riemenschneider's collection of 371 Bach Chorale Harmonisations, although Patsy surely knows nothing of Johann Sebastian Bach's work. He compares this to Dr. P's use of Robert Schumann in The Man Who Mistook His Wife for a Hat.

Avril wants Patsy to promise he will not get back in the ring. She cuts up his gear. She takes off her top and hits him, saying she does not want to be hurt again. Patsy asks her to be more ladylike and have sex.

Later, she gets a phone call, and collapses at what she hears. Patsy has fallen into a coma. The doctor says he will regain his memory if she keeps talking to him.

In the final scene, Avril pushes Patsy, now in a wheelchair, down the street where they first met, express their desire to have sex, and go through their counting routine.

== Recording ==
Love Counts an opera in two acts
- Photograph by Michael Nyman design by Russell Mills and Michael Webster

Studio album by Michael Nyman
- Released: 12 March 2007 (UK); 27 May 2008 (United States)
- Recorded: 4, 5, 12 December 2006 (Abbey Road Studios, London); 24–28 July 2006 (Olympic Studios, London)
- Genre: Opera
- Length: Disc 1: 60:17; Disc 2: 62:19
- Language: English
- Label: MN Records
- Producer: Simon Kiln

Michael Nyman chronology
Nyman Brass (2006)	Love Counts an opera in two acts (2007)	Mozart 252 (2008)

Soundtrack
Review scores
Source	Rating
The Guardian	4/5 stars

A recording based on the Almeida production was released in 2007 featuring Andrew Slater as Patsy Bear (bass) and Helen Williams as Avril Ainger (soprano). It is the 57th Michael Nyman album.

=== Personnel ===
The Michael Nyman Band

- conducted by Paul McGrath
- Ian Humphries, violin
- Phillippa Ibbotson, violin
- Nicolette Kuo, violin
- Jonathan Evans-Jones, violin
- Emlyn Singleton, violin
- Debbie Widdup, violin
- Harriet Davies, violin
- Fenella Barton violin
- Kate Musker, viola
- Nick Barr, viola
- Jonathan Barritt, cello
- Tony Hinnigan, cello
- William Schofield, cello
- Chris Laurence, bass
- Mary Scully, bass
- Andrew Walley, bass
- Martin Elliott, bass guitar
- Dominic Saunders, piano
- Walter Fabeck, keyboards
- Dave Fuest, clarinet, bass clarinet
- Andrew Sparling, bass clarinet
- Andrew Findon, baritone saxophone, flute, piccolo
- Dave Lee, horn
- Steve Sidwell, trumpet
- Nigel Gomm, trumpet
