= Richard Southern (theatre designer) =

British Theatre Designer, Lecturer and Researcher

Richard Southern (October 5, 1903 – August 1, 1989) was a British theatre designer and lecturer, best known for his extensive pictorial documentation of historical theatre construction, the Richard Southern Print Collection, comprising some 22,500 visual images. A prolific stage designer and theatre restorer, Southern devoted decades to researching and documenting theatre construction.

== Career ==
Southern was educated at St Dunstan's College, London, then at Goldsmiths Art School and the Royal Academy of Art, where he trained as a designer. Starting out in acting and stage managing, he designed sets for some fifty productions, staged at the Everyman Theatre, the Cambridge Festival Theatre, and London venues.

In 1947, Southern was appointed theatre planning adviser to the Arts Council. His investigation and reconstruction of period theatres and stages included work on Georgian theatres in Richmond, Yorkshire, and King's Lynn, Norfolk. He also took a leading role in the restoration of the first American theatre in Colonial Williamsburg, Virginia.

Together with George Speaight and Sybil Rosenfeld, Southern was a founder of the Society for Theatre Research which was supported by a journal, Theatre Notebook, which he co-edited for nine years.

In 1951, Southern designed the Studio Theatre for the newly formed Drama Department of the University of Bristol, where he lectured over the following two decades. In 1964, Southern was appointed a director of the Nuffield Theatre, University of Southampton, on whose design he had worked in collaboration with architect Sir Basil Spence. In the course of his career, Southern planned several modern theatres and stages including the Royal College of Art (1952), Reading University (1957), Nottingham (1961) and University College London (1967). After his retirement in 1969, he participated in the construction of the Globe Theatre in London, partly based on his earlier models of the Swan Theatre.

== Teaching activity ==
Southern was appointed as Technical Lecturer at Goldsmiths College in 1932 and of the London Theatre Studio in 1937. He was associated with the University of Bristol's Department of Drama since its establishment and delivered a series of annual lectures in the department over a period of four years, funded by the Rockefeller Foundation. He was appointed a Visiting Lecturer in 1959, and from 1961 to 1969 was a Special Lecturer in Theatre Architecture.

== Honors ==
- Honorary D.Litt. (1956) from the University of Bristol

== Selected bibliography ==
- The Medieval Theatre in the Round : a Study of the Staging of 'The Castle of Perseverance' and Related Matters (1975, 2nd ed.)
- The Staging of Plays before Shakespeare (1973)
- The Victorian Theatre : a Pictorial Survey (1970)
- The Seven Ages of the Theatre; with line drawings by the author (1968, 2nd ed.)
- The Georgian Theatre, Richmond, Yorkshire : the story of the theatre (1962)
- On Reconstructing a Practicable Elizabethan Public Playhouse (1959)
- The Dramatic Studio of the University of Bristol = Le Studio Dramatique de l'Université de Bristol (1955)
- The Open Stage and the Modern Theatre in Research and Practice (1953)
- Changeable Scenery : its Origin and Development in the British theatre (1952)
- The Georgian Playhouse (1948)
- Proscenium and Sight-Lines : a Complete System of Scenery Planning and a Guide to the Laying out of Stages for Scene-designers, Stage-managers, Theatre Architects and Engineers (1939)
- Stage-Setting for Amateurs and Professionals (1937)
- The Staging of Eighteenth-century Designs for Scenery (1935)
