= Jeremy Herbert =

Jeremy Herbert, (b. 1960) from London, is an international multi-media artist specializing in theatre design.

He trained under Margaret Harris on the Motley Theatre Design Course.

Jeremy Herbert's credits include both premieres of 4.48 Psychosis and Cleansed written by Sarah Kane at the Royal Court Theatre. He staged Sexual Perversity in Chicago, Laurence Boswell's dark adaptation of Beauty and the Beast, Up for Grabs, Treats, and recently The Ugly One for the Royal Court Theatre.

He frequently works with directors Ian Rickson, Ramin Gray and Laurence Boswell.

== Awards ==
- 1995 - Arts Foundation Award - Theatre Design
- 2000 - Barclays Theatre Award - Best Designer for 4.48 Psychosis.
- 2004 - NESTA Fellowship Dream Time Award - Design
