= Jacques Copeau =

French director

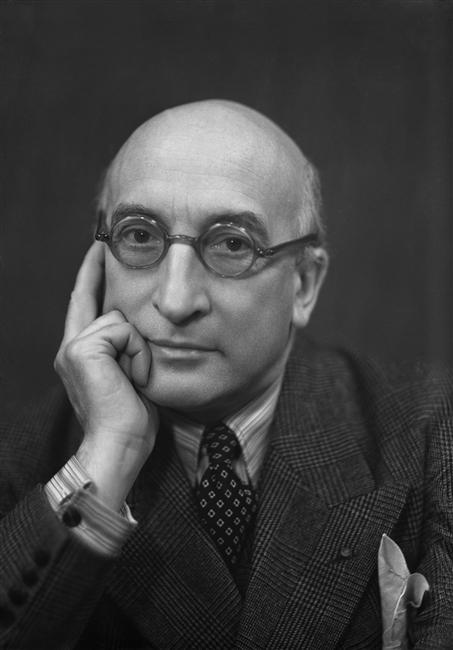
- Jacques Copeau, 1936
- Born: 4 February 1879; Paris, France
- Died: 20 October 1949 (aged 70); Beaune, France
- Occupations: Director, producer, actor, and dramatist

Jacques Copeau (French: [kɔpo]; 4 February 1879 – 20 October 1949) was a French theatre director, producer, actor, and dramatist. Before he founded the Théâtre du Vieux-Colombier in Paris, he wrote theatre reviews for several Parisian journals, worked at the Georges Petit Gallery where he organized exhibits of artists' works and helped found the Nouvelle Revue Française in 1909, along with writer friends, such as André Gide and Jean Schlumberger.

Twentieth century French theatre is marked by Copeau's outlook. According to Albert Camus, "in the history of the French theatre, there are two periods: before Copeau and after Copeau."

== Early life and formative years ==
The child of a well-off middle-class family, the Paris-born Copeau was raised in Paris and attended the best schools. At the Lycée Condorcet, he was a talented but nonchalant student whose interest in theatre already consumed him. His first staged play, Brouillard du matin ("Morning Fog"), was presented on 27 March 1897 at the Nouveau-Théâtre as part of the festivities of the alumni association of the Lycée Condorcet. The former president of the French Republic, Casimir-Perier, and the playwright Georges de Porto-Riche both congratulated him on his work.

During the same period when Copeau was preparing his baccalauréat exams, he met Agnès Thomsen, a young Danish woman seven years his elder who was in Paris to perfect her French. They first met on 13 March 1896, and Copeau, then a seventeen-year-old high school student, quickly fell in love.

Eventually, Copeau passed his exams and began his studies in philosophy at the Sorbonne, but the theatre, extensive reading, and his courtship of Agnès left him little time to study and kept him from passing his exams for the licence, despite several attempts. Against his mother's wishes he married Agnès in June 1902 in Copenhagen. Their first child, Marie-Hélène (called Maiène), was born on 2 December 1902. In mid-April 1905 their second daughter, Hedwig, was born.

In April 1903, the young family made its way back to France where Copeau took up his duties as director of the family's factory in Raucourt in the Ardennes. He reinserted himself into a small literary coterie of friends, among them now, André Gide. While living in Angecourt in the Ardennes, Copeau frequently travelled to Paris where he made a name for himself as theatre critic-at-large for several publications. Back in Paris in 1905, Copeau continued his work as theatre critic, writing reviews of such plays as Ibsen's A Doll's House and Gabriele D’Annunzio's La Gioconda as well an overview of the structure of contemporary theatre published in L'Ermitage in February.

In July 1905, he took on a job at the Georges Petit Gallery where he assembled exhibits and wrote the catalogues. He stayed at the Petit Gallery until May 1909. During this period he continued to write theatre reviews and garnered a reputation as an astute and principled judge of the theatre arts. The sale of the factory in Raucourt gave him the financial independence that allowed him to pursue his literary activities. Copeau was one of the founders of the Nouvelle Revue Française (NRF),^{:61} a publication that was to become one of the leading arbiters of literary taste in France.

Copeau and his young family visited the island of Jersey on two occasions. In 1907, he stayed at Prospect Lodge, then in 1909 at Madeira Villa, both in St Brelade, where he pursued his work on theatrical adaptations, the most well-known being that of Dostoevsky’s The Brothers Karamazov, a project co-written with schoolfriend Jean Croué. André Gide, a visitor to Jersey in 1907, played a pivotal role in Copeau's career at this stage.

He finished work on The Brothers Karamazov by the end of 1910. He was now ready to work in the theatre as a practitioner not only as critic.

The play was staged in April 1911 under the direction of Jacques Rouché at the Théâtre des Arts, receiving favorable reviews. Charles Dullin, who played the role of Smerdiakov, was particularly singled out for a fine performance. A second staging of the adaptation the following October, with Louis Jouvet in the role of Father Zossima, confirmed the earlier critical claim.

In 1910, he bought Le Limon, a piece of property in the Seine-et-Marne département, away from the distractions of Paris.

== The Théâtre du Vieux-Colombier ==
Copeau wanted to rid the Paris stage of the rank commercialism and tawdriness represented by the boulevard theatre. He wanted to move the theatre to a simpler style, freed from the ornamentation that obscured even the finest texts.

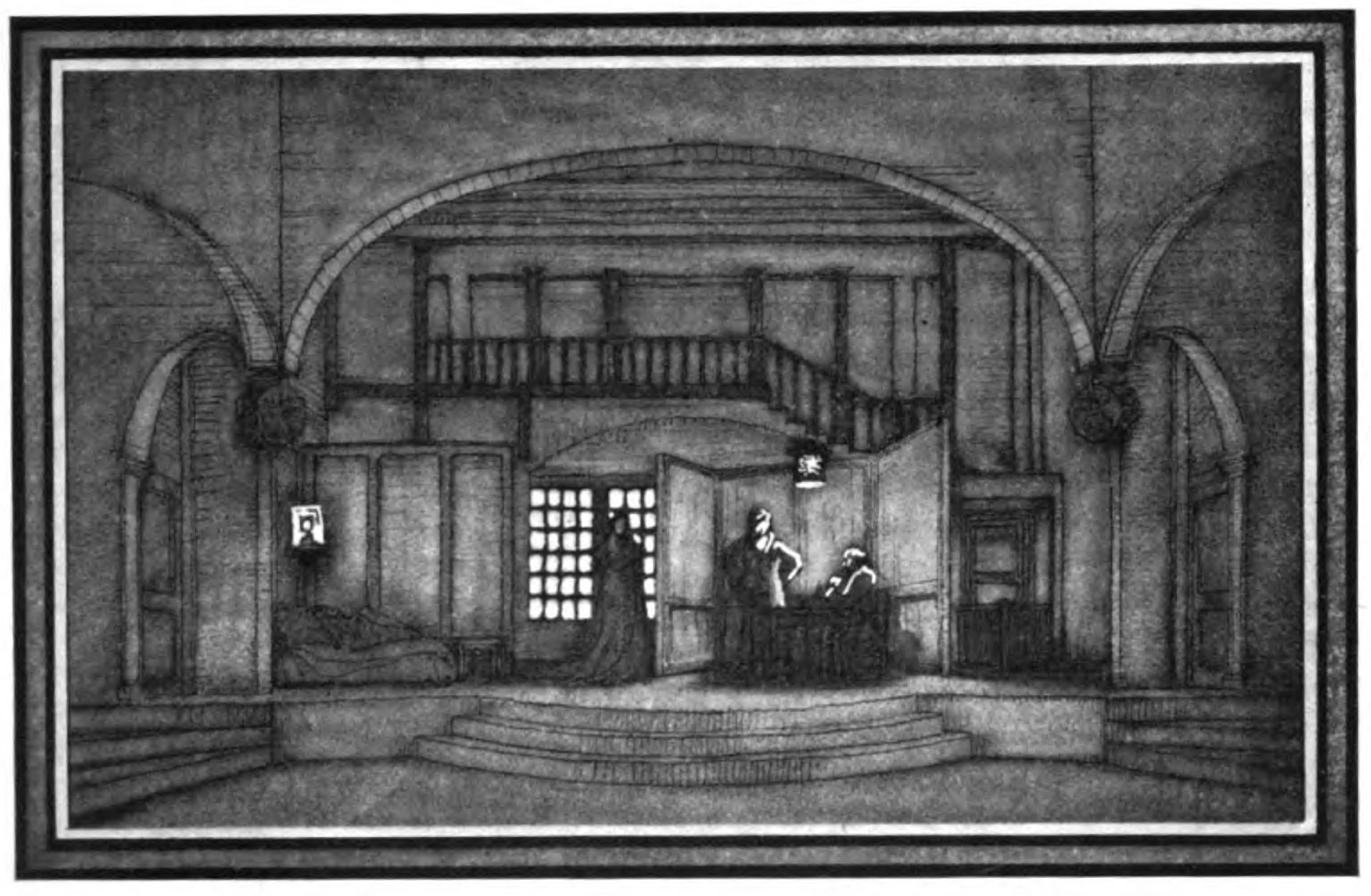
Set design by Louis Jouvet for Copeau's production of The Brothers Karamazov

On the Left Bank, on the rue du Vieux-Colombier, he rented the old and dilapidated Athénée-Saint-Germain, an unlikely venue for the utopian ideals of Copeau, but its location at distance from the commercial theatre district gave a signal that he intended to pursue a new path. He named the theatre after the street so that it could be found more easily. In the spring of 1913, with the help of Charles Dullin in whose Montmartre apartment the auditions took place, Copeau started to assemble a company. Besides Dullin and Louis Jouvet, whom he took on principally as stage manager, he hired, among others, Roger Karl and Suzanne Bing.

During the summer of 1913, Copeau took his troupe to Le Limon, his country house in the Marne valley. The return of the troupe to Paris at the beginning of September, coincided with the publication in the NRF of Copeau's Un essai de rénovation Dramatique: le théâtre du Vieux-Colombier ("Essay on Dramatic Renewal: The Théâtre du Vieux-Colombier"), in which he set forth the principles of this project: first, the choice of place far from the despised Right Bank boulevard in a district closer to schools and the center of artistic life where the new theatre might attract an audience of students, intellectuals and artists with a subscription system that would assure reasonable prices; second, a variety of productions—as many as three different productions a week, which would not only appeal to a wider public, but would offer the actors the opportunity to play several different sorts of roles in quick succession, maintaining the suppleness of their interpretive skills; third, a repertoire both classic and modern would mark the offerings of the company: the classic plays of Jean Racine and Molière—never put in modern dress to keep them à la mode—and the best plays of the previous thirty years. Copeau wanted to entice new playwrights, perhaps those who had despaired that the theatre would ever present works of quality. And, fourth, he held in disdain ham acting or cabotinage, so common in the commercial theatre.

He proposed eventually a school for young actors in order to create a new cohort of actors whose taste and instincts would remain above compromise. Lastly, he proposed a simple stage freed from the overworked scenic machinery that had become commonplace: "Pour l'œuvre nouvelle, qu'on nous laisse un plateau nu" ("For our new undertaking, just give us a bare platform"), he wrote (Registres I, p. 32).

Copeau's advertising poster for the opening of the Théâtre du Vieux-Colombier was a veritable manifesto; a call against the overladen productions of the established theatres in Paris.

At the beginning of October, there appeared on the kiosks of Paris a poster announcing Copeau's appeal to the youth to reject the commercial theatre, to a literate public who wanted to see preserved the classic master pieces of both the French and foreign theatre and to all those who wanted to support a theatre that would excel through its fair prices, variety, and quality of its interpretations and staging. Many years of hard work preceded his Appel, but the "Old Dove-cote" theatre was now ready to open.

During the first season, Copeau kept his promises. He staged plays from the classics, fairly recent works of quality, and the offerings of new playwrights from outside the theatre such as Jean Schlumberger and Roger Martin du Gard. The Théâtre du Vieux-Colombier was inaugurated with a little ceremony on 22 October 1913 and opened with its first public performance on the next evening with Heywood's A Woman Killed By Kindness ("Une femme tuée par la douceur"), but the Elizabethan melodrama did not impress the critics and the public remained indifferent. Molière's Amour médecin, however, received a more promising reception. The Schlumberger offering, Les Fils Louverné ("The Louverné Sons"), a rather austere drama about sibling conflict, was followed by Alfred de Musset's Barberine, a delightfully poetic piece that charmed the public and showed off the talents of the young company on a bare stage. Dullin triumphed in his signature interpretation of Harpagon in Molière's L’Avare ("The Miser") and the troupe showed its physical dexterity in Molière's farce, La Jalousie du Barbouillé ("The Jealousy of Barbouillé").

They performed Paul Claudel's L’Échange ("The Exchange"); dating from 1894 when he was in "exile" as a diplomat in Boston, the play deals with the relationship between spouses. A popular revival of the Copeau-Croué adaptation of The Brothers Karamazov saw Dullin once again as Smerdiakov, Jouvet as Feodor, and Copeau as Ivan. In May, the troupe, exhausted but buoyed by its artistic and sometimes critical successes, staged an adaptation of Shakespeare's Twelfth Night or Nuit des rois to close the season.

Both in its preparation and mise-en-scène, Nuit des rois has entered into legend. Stories abound of Copeau and Jouvet working forty-eight hours non-stop to set the lighting and of Duncan Grant, the English artist who created the costumes, chasing after actors to apply one last dab of color just before the curtain was to come up. The play garnered both critical and public acclaim. With Jouvet as Sir Andrew Aguecheek, Suzanne Bing as Viola, Blanche Albane as Olivia, and Romain Bouquet as Sir Toby Belch, in a startlingly simple stage setting, the play called upon the audience's imagination in a way that had not been seen on a Paris stage since Paul Fort, an earlier reformer who had worked in the theatre in the 1890s. Enthusiastic crowds finally queued up to see this rendition of "real Shakespeare" (Kurtz, pg. 31), but the run closed as scheduled for the troupe was off to Alsace on tour.

== During World War I ==
Planning for the next season began in earnest, but August 1914 brought the outbreak of the First World War. With the men of the troupe called up for duty, including Copeau, there remained no choice but to close the theatre. Remanded to Paris, he kept a thriving correspondence with Jouvet and Dullin about the theatre. With Jouvet, he pondered the various possibilities of stagecraft and how the stage at the Vieux-Colombier could be shaped to fit their ideas about a "nouvelle comédie"—a new comedy reminiscent of the Italian commedia dell'arte. From their discussion came the concept of the "loggia" or a unit set that would be developed and used during the New York years and at the Vieux-Colombier in Paris after the war.

At first, Copeau busied himself with an adaptation of Shakespeare's The Winter's Tale along with Suzanne Bing while news from the front worsened. A telegram in August 1915 from Edward Gordon Craig inviting him to Florence to discuss a possible staging of Johann Sebastian Bach's The Passion According to Saint Matthew was greeted with enthusiasm. A month in Florence discussing with Craig, himself an important reformer of the theatre, helped put many of his own ideas in perspective for Copeau and Craig did not always agree on the means to reach their goal of a theatre renewed.

Before the war Craig had founded a school at the Arena Goldoni where his students studied acting and stagecraft. For Craig any reform of the theatre had to begin with the training of the actor but he did not believe, as did Copeau, that it was possible. His idea of the übermarionnette, the super-marionnette, to replace the human actor completely was a product of the lack of faith in the possibility of educating the actor.

On his return trip to Paris, Copeau stopped in Geneva for further discussions on the theatre with the scene designer Adolphe Appia and with Émile Jaques-Dalcroze, the musician and founder of the Institut de gymnastique rhythmique ("The Institute of Eurhythmics"). After having observed several of Jaques-Dalcroze's classes, he saw in Dalcroze's methods useful means for training young actors in movement. Upon his return to Paris he and Bing immediately went about setting up training sessions for youngsters using Dalcroze's methods. They soon realized from these initial efforts that the method indeed had a lot to offer, but that they also had much to learn.

In the summer of 1916, Copeau received an invitation to organize a tour with the Vieux-Colombier in America, supposedly to counteract the influence of the German theatre in New York City, but also as a propaganda move to continue American support of the French cause. He immediately saw this as an opportunity to bring back his actors from the front and to reconstitute his theatre, but also as a means of shoring up the weak finances of the Vieux-Colombier. But his efforts to free his actors from military duty proved futile and so he left alone in January 1917 for a lecture tour in the United States.

== In New York ==
Several laudatory articles in the New York press preceded his arrival. In the New York Times for example, an article by Henri-Pierre Roche carried the title: "Arch-Rebel of the French Theatre Coming Here." Copeau's presence in New York City attracted the attention of many, but none more influential in regard to his goals than Otto H. Kahn, the philanthropist and patron of the arts. Kahn invited Copeau to dinner at his mansion on East 68th Street and then from the table to the theatre to see George Bernard Shaw's Getting Married.

The next day Copeau accompanied Mrs. Kahn to the Metropolitan Museum. Sufficiently impressed by what he learned from Copeau and from others, on 19 February Kahn offered to Copeau the directorship of what was known as the Théâtre Français, the French-language theatre that had been languishing under the directorship of Etienne Bonheur. He offered to Copeau the Bijou Theatre, a new house that opened in April 1917.

Copeau chose rather an older theatre, the Garrick Theatre on West 35th Street which housed the Théâtre Français, because he felt that with the proper renovations, among other considerations, it would better suit the unit set he had conceived with Jouvet. For the renovations, he hired a young Czech architect, Antonin Raymond, whose modernist concepts coincided well with his ideas of stagecraft. From March through April he delivered some dozen lectures on topics such as Dramatic Art and the theatre Industry, The Renewal of Stagecraft, and The Spirit in the Little Theatres.

When the inauguration of the Théâtre Français de New York took place at the Metropolitan Opera on 17 May 1917, Copeau had negotiated a generous contract with Otto Kahn and the board of directors and was ready to return to Paris with a letter of credit for $18,000 to cover the costs of preparation for the season in New York City.

The summer in Paris proved to be a busy one: the repertoire for the coming season needed to be chosen; costumes, assembled; and his troupe, reconstituted. The latter proved a daunting task. Jouvet was finally given leave from his duties at the Front, but the authorities refused to release Dullin. Jouvet constructed a model set, given the dimensions of the stage area at the Garrick while in New York the young Antonin Raymond battled with the Shubert brothers and their architect over the renovations to the theatre.

With the intervention of Kahn, who footed the bill, and Mrs. Philip Lydig, who was overlooking many of the decorative details of the hall itself, the old Garrick finally started to take shape. Jouvet, who knew that the design of the stage was essential to the success of the repertory that Copeau projected, left France in early October to oversee the final preparations of the stage. When the troupe arrived in New York on 11 November 1917, all was not ready for the season. Renovations on the stage remained unfinished, the subscriptions for the season were not quite as substantial as initially reported, and housing for the actors was not available as projected and they were put up in hotels.

On 26 November 1917, the Théâtre du Vieux-Colombier de New York opened its season on the stage of the renovated Garrick Theatre with an Impromptu du Vieux-Colombier, a piece written especially for the occasion by Copeau, and Molière's Les Fourberies de Scapin ("Scapin's Pranks"). In the center of the stage stood the bare platform Copeau had asked for in his Appel, which allowed the actors to wander about the stage until they were needed in a particular scene. The freedom of movement did not go unnoticed by the critics, as John Corbin of the New York Times remarked: "it renders possible many combinations and groupings, all sorts of telling encounters."

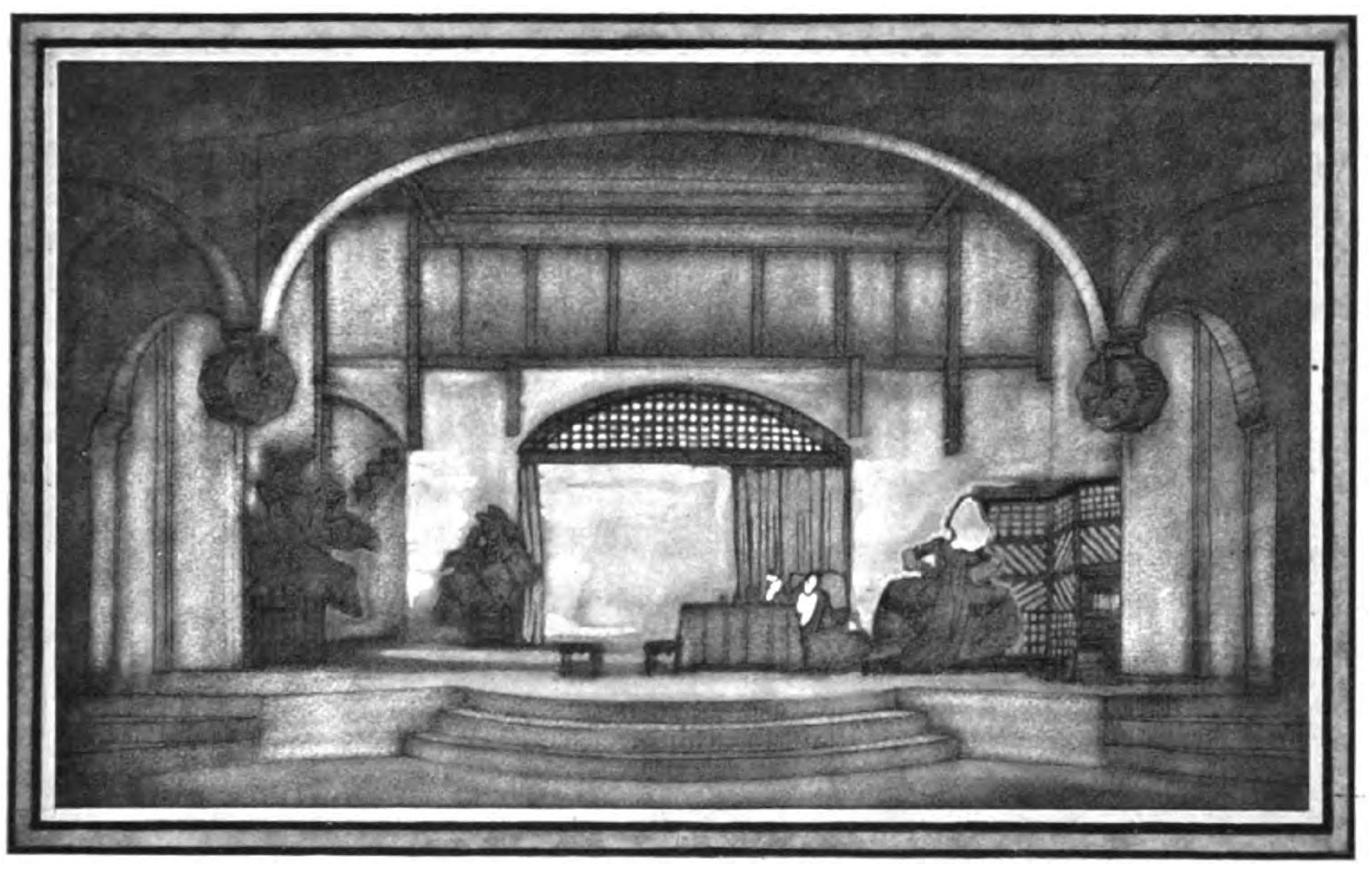
Set design by Louis Jouvet for Copeau's production of Le Carrosse du Saint-Sacrement

During the first season, Vieux-Colombier in New York staged twenty-one different plays. Among them were ten plays from the first season in Paris but with a different casts since not all the original members of the troupe came to New York: Molière's La Jalousie du Barbouillé, L'Avare and L'Amour médecin, Musset's Barberine, the Copeau/Croué adaptation of Dostoevsky's The Brothers Karamazov, and Nuit des rois, the adaptation of Shakespeare's Twelfth Night shared the stage with Le Carrosse du Saint-Sacrement ("The Carriage of the Holy Sacrament") of Prosper Mérimée, La Surprise de l'Amour (Love's Surprise) of Musset, and Poil de Carotte (Carrot Head) of Jules Renard.

As during the first season, a mixture of both classic and modern plays, some by living authors, served as the basis of the repertoire. At the close of the New York season, Copeau took his troupe to Washington, D.C. and to the Little Theatre in Philadelphia where they presented ten different plays. In early May, they performed L'Avare at Vassar College to close their season.

Certain offerings of the Vieux-Colombier received critical and popular acclaim. To no one's surprise The Brothers Karamazov, with Dullin, who finally arrived in New York in March 1918, in the role of Smerdiakov and later in his well-received role as Harpagon, the miser, counted among the successes. Nuit des rois also burnished the company's reputation. Some plays, such as Octave Mirbeau's Les Mauvais Bergers (The Evil Shepherds), ended with an almost empty house as the audience stalked to the exits during the play before the final curtain.

On 20 May, the entire troupe wended its way to the palatial estate of Otto Kahn in Morristown, New Jersey where they were to prepare the 1918–19 season of twenty-nine plays of which twenty-six would be new plays. Copeau, the taskmaster, established a rigorous regimen of rehearsals and exercises starting early in the morning and ending late in the day before dinner. The fatigue from the exertions of the first season, the hot summer, the rationed food, now that the United States was part of the war effort, took their toll on the spirits of these French actors and actresses. A bout of typhoid fever among the Copeau and Jouvet children and fear of the Spanish influenza added to the consternation.

The second season opened with a piece by Henri Bernstein, Le Secret, which had already played on Broadway. But Copeau was made aware that he needed to bow somewhat to popular taste if the Vieux-Colombier was to succeed financially. The second offering of the season—Pierre Beaumarchais's Le Mariage de Figaro—proved to be both a critical and popular success and maintained Copeau's standards. Among the other successes was Henrik Ibsen's Rosmersholm in a translation by Agnès Thomsen Copeau with Dullin as Rosmer and Copeau in the role of Kroll.

Copeau considered the aesthetic highlight of the season Maurice Maeterlinck's Pelléas et Mélisande, principally because of the way the unit set with subtle lighting and the judicious use of banners on its several levels allowed an uninterrupted flow of action in this major work of the Symbolist movement. The dispute between Copeau and several members of the company, including Dullin, led to their dismissal by the end of January. The season ended with an Impromptu, during which all the members of the troupe who remained played short scenes representing their major portrayals. At the end of the presentation, all the costumes were placed in the wicker baskets marked with the two doves representing the Théâtre du Vieux-Colombier.

Before Copeau returned to Europe, he must have been buoyed by the positive reaction of the critics, some of whom did not always look kindly upon the Vieux-Colombier's offerings. The critic of The Nation who had consistently praised Copeau's efforts wrote: "The Vieux-Colombier has not only afforded New York a continually varied feast of inspiration and refreshment but it has set for us a new and practicable standard by which American dramatic art may be tested".

== The Paris years: 1920–1924 ==
The theatre and the School are one and the same thing.—Notebook of Suzanne Bing

Upon his return to Paris, Copeau needed a period of rest and reflection, but certain pressing tasks demanded his time. He finished the adaptation of The Winter's Tale, which would be the first offering when the theatre reopened in January 1920, and with Jouvet he oversaw the renovations to the stage and the lighting at the Vieux-Colombier. A unit set compatible with the dimensions of the stage area and the installation of an innovative lighting system controlled from backstage—baptized jouvets—were installed. More important in the eyes of Copeau, a school of dramatic arts remained essential if he was to realize the renewal of the theatre that had been his dream for over a decade.

The theatre opened its doors on 9 February 1920 with The Winter's Tale on the renovated stage. The almost bare stage and the gray walls in the background puzzled critics and the public alike. The next offerings, Charles Vildrac's Le Paquebot Tenacity (The Steamboat Tenacity) and Prosper Mérimée's Le Carrosse du Saint-Sacrement elicited both critical and popular favor. The story of two young men, Ségard and Bastien, waiting for the S.S. Tenacity with its love interest—Ségard runs off with a barmaid, Thérèse, to live out his life in France and its sense of both adventure and loss: Bastien leaves for Canada—was more readily acceptable.

By the end of the season, which ended with La Fontaine's La Coupe Enchantée ("The Enchanted Goblet"), a holdover from New York, the company had also performed Georges Duhamel's L'Oeuvre des athlètes ("The Athlete's Work""), Jules Romains's Cromedeyre-le-Vieil, and Emile Mazoud's La Folle Journée ("What a Crazy Day"), works by contemporary writers newly initiated into the theatre. After two years in New York, this was a company of proven theatrical skills in plays from various eras and of diverse styles.

By the end of February auditions were being held for the "Classes at the Vieux-Colombier", an undertaking Copeau asked Suzanne Bing to organize. Some of the students worked already for the Vieux-Colombier, others were students of actors at the Comédie-Française, but in all a rather mixed group with widely different backgrounds. The classes, which took place in a room in the courtyard behind the theatre, were devoted to close readings of texts with emphasis not only on the meaning but the rhythms as well as physical exercises and improvisations. The sessions ended in June with a charade presented before Copeau and a few friends of the Vieux-Colombier which le patron found quite satisfying (Registres VI, p. 225).

At the end of the shortened spring 1920 theatre season, the Vieux-Colombier, although an aesthetic success, found itself in debt. The theatre, now smaller because of the apron that extended from the stage, was barely economically viable. Copeau called upon the generosity of the Friends of the Vieux-Colombier who helped fill its coffers. The school, meanwhile, lacked sufficient space to expand its enrollment or its curriculum.

Despite efforts on the part of Jouvet during the summer, no suitable space was found. The school started up in December, using space on the second floor of the building that housed the theatre. Suzanne Bing was again in charge of the young people between the ages of fourteen and eighteen years old, and Copeau also offered a course of the "History of the theatre." But this experiment was far from the elaborate program that Copeau had in mind.

The 1920/1921 season at the Vieux-Colombier began with popular re-runs from previous season, opening with Vildrac's Le Paquebot Tenacity followed by Nuit des rois, which Parisians had not seen since the end of the first season in 1914. The highly demanding Vieux-Colombier audiences were happy to see fine performances of classics under the deft direction of Copeau. Critics, though, wondered when new plays would be on the bill. In January, Copeau staged Henri Ghéon's Le Pauvre sous l'escalier ("The Beggar under the Staircase"), the story based on the medieval tale of the life of Saint Alexis. La Mort de Sparte ("The Death of Sparta"), a play by Copeau's friend Jean Schlumberger dating from before the war, garnered neither critical nor popular praise.

The highlight of the 1921/1922 season was the opening the School of the Vieux-Colombier in a building on Rue du Cherche-Midi, around the corner from the theatre. Courses began in November under the directorship of Jules Romains, author and graduate of the École Normale Supérieure. Among the teaching staff were Copeau himself who would teach a course on the theory of the theatre and Greek tragedy, and Jouvet who taught a complementary course on the Greek theatre from the point of view of its architecture. Bing taught the beginning course on reading and diction and along with Copeau a course on the formation of the dramatic instinct. Copeau's daughter Marie-Hélène was in charge of a workshop on the use of different materials, on geometric design, on costume design and production.

The fame of the Vieux-Colombier seemed to reach its apogee in the 1922–23 season. The house was filled for every performance and visitors to Paris complained of the impossibility of getting tickets to any of its offerings. Copeau organized a touring company to the provinces. Invitations to play in other countries in the off-season abounded. When Konstantin Stanislavski, the director of the Moscow Art Theatre, came to Paris in December 1922, he and his troupe were warmly received on the stage of the Vieux-Colombier. The influence of Copeau's principles to which he held without flinching was felt throughout Europe and the United States. Despite the fame, conflict arose.

Jouvet, who understood the economics of the theatre better than Copeau, knew that a larger theatre and a more profitable pricing system were needed. His proposal fell on deaf ears. When he was asked to direct at the Théâtre des Champs-Élysées, he chose his freedom. Even Romains decided that the Right Bank theatres were more hospitable to his work after Copeau rejected one of his plays. Despite the problems at the theatre, the school continued to thrive. Copeau allowed his young charges to appear in a production of Gide's Saül as the masked demons that taunt the king played by Copeau himself. The critical reaction was quite positive. The season ended, as the previous ones had, with the Vieux-Colombier in debt.

When the 1923/24 season opened, the Vieux-Colombier found itself in competition with former members of the company since Jouvet's and Dullin's theatre drew from the same public as Copeau. Its subscriber base reduced, the Vieux-Colombier no longer held the cherished spot in the heart of those theatregoers who sought quality in the theatre. For Copeau, two events marked the highpoints of the season: the staging of his long-awaited La Maison natale, a work that had its inception in various forms more than twenty years earlier, and the Noh play Kantan with the students of the school under the direction of Suzanne Bing.

Copeau's piece dealt with the theme of an autocratic father whose two sons, Maxime and Pierre, have already left the nest to find happiness elsewhere. André, the youngest son, remains at home, but is encouraged by his grandfather to search for his happiness. When the father dies, André is confronted with the choice of running the family's factory or self-fulfillment. Maxime returns, seeks forgiveness, and André, with his grandfather's blessing, leaves the family home. The play, found to be lacking in dramatic action, was not greeted with great critical acclaim, much to Copeau's chagrin. Kantan, on the other hand, represented for Copeau the culmination of two and a half years hard work with his apprentice actors and the fulfillment of a dream of over a decade.

The play never made it onto the boards of the Vieux-Colombier because Aman Maistre, one of the actors, sprained his knee, but Harley Granville-Barker and Adolphe Appia saw it in rehearsals. Barker, after having seen the play, was effusive in his praise for the effects of the training the students received at the Vieux-Colombier: "If you were able to do that in three years, in ten years you could do anything at all." (Registres VI, p. 401) The play, performed with masked characters, allowed the young actors to show off to good effect their grace, athleticism and voice training.

At the end of the season, the troupe undertook a tour through eastern France, Belgium, and Switzerland. Then, Copeau made the momentous decision to abandon entirely the Théâtre du Vieux-Colombier. Unable to make any concessions to the commercial aspects of the theatre, tired of looking to his friends for support, he felt he had no alternatives. Despite the offer of help from Jouvet to make the Vieux-Colombier both an artistic and financial success, Copeau chose his independence. By mid-summer, the Vieux-Colombier was liquidated. With some of his actors and young apprentices in tow, Copeau moved to the Burgundy countryside to begin a new project.

== The Burgundy adventure: the "Copiaus" ==
The word "school" is no longer valid from that time on.—Suzanne Bing (Registres VI, p. 416)

In October, 1924, Copeau and his company of young enthusiasts set up shop in what they called ironically the "Château de Morteuil" in a village some seven miles from Beaune. In effect Copeau at first tried to re-establish the school of the Vieux-Colombier in this new context. But, lacking funds, he needed to lecture frequently to pay expenses. He decided to mount two plays before a group of industrialists in Lille in January 1925 in order to secure financial backing for the troupe with a greatly reduced number of plays and a new plan of attack: "four plays a year, eight months of preparation, four months of stagings, one month in Paris and three months in the provinces and abroad" (Journal II, 219).

Copeau's request for funds and the plays failed to garner the needed financial support and he continued his lectures both in France and Belgium. At this point both actors and apprentices were given their freedom to leave and, given his reduced financial status, he devised a new approach.

After the departure of some of the student actors and teachers, Copeau began work with his reduced troupe on the "New Comedy", an attempt to reproduce the Italian commedia dell'arte with masks and an acting style based on improvisation. He composed a text, Le Veuf (The Widower), that the actors began to rehearse on a simple platform in the main hall at Morteuil. The residents of the surrounding villages, now accustomed to the fanciful lives of the actors, their costumes and their parading through their towns, baptized them les Copiaus.

Starting in May 1925, the Copiaus performed plays by Molière as well as those written expressly for them by Copeau, using masks of their own invention. Their presentations were preceded by a parade of the entire troupe, accompanied by drums, horns and colorful banners. They performed on a bare platform in village squares or whatever indoor space they could find. Copeau continued his work with this troupe as best he could, despite his heavy schedule of readings and lectures. But given their inventiveness and creativity, his control over the troupe lessened.

At the end of the year, the troupe moved to Pernand-Vergelesses, a village in the heart of the wine-producing region of Burgundy, where Copeau had purchased a house and property better suited to his family and the needs of the Copiaus. From this headquarters the Copiaus would take their increasingly sophisticated offerings to many of the little towns of Burgundy and abroad to Switzerland, Belgium, the Netherlands, and eventually to Italy. Copeau, too, continued his heavy schedule of dramatic readings to help support himself and the troupe. In November 1926, he left on a lecture tour in the United States where he was also to direct The Brothers Karamazov in English for the Theatre Guild in January 1927.

In June 1929, the Copiaus formed a new troupe, La Compagnie des Quinze, led by Michel Saint-Denis. They returned to Paris where they performed Noé (Noah), a play by André Obey, under the direction of Michel St-Denis. From this point on, Copeau's direct influence over what had once been the École du Vieux-Colombier ended, although his influence on a personal level would remain strong.

== Later life ==
In 1933 Copeau mounted a production of The Mystery of Saint Uliva, in the cloister of the Santa Croce in Florence and in 1935 Savonarola, on the central square of Florence. In Paris, he directed an adaptation of Much Ado About Nothing and Molière's Le Misanthrope at the Comédie-Française in 1936. In 1937, again at the Comédie-Française, he directed Jean Racine's Bajazet, followed in 1938 by Le Testement du Père Leleu, a reprise of Roger Martin du Gard's play from the days of the Vieux-Colombier.

In 1940, Copeau was named Provisionary Administrator of the Comédie-Française, where he staged Pierre Corneilles Le Cid, Shakespeare's Twelfth Night, and Mérimée's Le Carrosse du Saint-Sacrement. Unable to follow the orders of the German occupiers, he resigned his position in March 1941 and withdrew to his home in Pernand-Vergelesses. Le Miracle du pain doré ("The Miracle of the Golden Bread"), his own work, was staged at the Hospices de Beaune in 1943 and the following year, his play about Saint Francis of Assisi, Le Petit Pauvre (The Poor Little One) was published.

== Death ==
Copeau died at the Hospices de Beaune on 20 October 1949. He and his wife are buried at the church graveyard in Pernand-Vergelesses.
