= Margaret Harris =

English theatre costume designer (1904–2000)

Margaret Harris OBE
- Born: Margaret Frances Harris; 28 May 1904; Hayes, Kent, England
- Died: 10 May 2000 (aged 95); Northwood, London, England
- Years active: 1932–2000
- Awards: Tony Award for Best Costume Design 1958 The First Gentleman 1961 Becket; Society of London Theatre Special Award 1997

Margaret Frances Harris OBE (28 May 1904 – 10 May 2000) was an English theatre and opera costume and scenic designer.

== Biography ==
=== Early years ===
Harris was born in Hayes, Kent, the fourth child and second daughter of William Birkbeck Harris, a Lloyds Insurance clerk, and his wife Kathleen Marion, née Carey. With her older sister Sophie Harris she studied at the Chelsea Illustrators Studio in London in the late 1920s. A fellow student was Elizabeth Montgomery, and the three formed a theatre design partnership known as Motley Theatre Design Group.

=== Career ===
The first full-scale production on which they worked was Romeo and Juliet for the Oxford University Dramatic Society (OUDS), John Gielgud's debut as a director. The great success of this led to an invitation from Gielgud to design Gordon Daviot's Richard of Bordeaux, which opened at the New Theatre in St Martins Lane, London, in February 1933. The production was a huge success, achieving cult status, with playgoers queuing round the block every night. It is widely recognised that the success was partly owing to the Motley sets and costumes, which captured the essence of the period in an artistic rather than a slavishly historical sense, and were much admired for their beauty and lightness. This early recognition led to a busy and highly successful decade during which they became Gielgud's regular collaborators, working with him on such productions as his celebrated Romeo and Juliet (1935), in which he alternated the parts of Romeo and Mercutio with Laurence Olivier, and his Hamlet of 1936. They also formed a partnership with the celebrated French director Michel Saint-Denis, whose production of André Obey's Noah, starring Gielgud in the title role, they designed in 1935. Saint Denis went on to found the London Theatre Studio (1936–1939), a radical new theatre school which incorporated courses in theatre design taught by the Motleys. This was the first time theatre design had been taught within a drama school in the UK, and their students included Jocelyn Herbert. In addition to their teaching and theatre work, the Motleys also opened a couture house in 1936.

At the beginning of World War II, Margaret Harris and Elizabeth Montgomery travelled to the United States to design a production of Romeo and Juliet for Laurence Olivier. They stayed in America until the end of the war, designing numerous successful productions on Broadway. Margaret Harris also worked for a time with the furniture designer Charles Eames on his moulded plywood aeroplane parts.

Returning to England in 1946, Margaret Harris and her sister Sophie taught theatre design at the newly founded Bristol Old Vic Theatre School, which had been set up by Michel Saint-Denis, George Devine and Glen Byam Shaw. Following the closure of the school in 1948, the Motleys continued to design extensively for both opera (at London's Sadler's Wells Theatre and English National Opera) and theatre. Their work at the Shakespeare Memorial Theatre was much admired throughout the 1950s. In the early days of Devine's newly founded English Stage Company at the Royal Court Theatre (founded 1956), the Motleys designed numerous productions. Margaret Harris became Head of Design at Sadler's Wells Opera in 1962.

In 1966, after the death of her sister Sophie, Harris founded the Motley Theatre Design Course, a one-year post-graduate level course which ran until 2011. She continued to design, mostly for the English National Opera, until the late 1970s, and remained as the director of the Motley Theatre Design Course until a few months before her death on 10 May 2000 at Denville Hall, two weeks before her 96th birthday.

=== Honours ===
Harris was appointed Officer of the Order of the British Empire in the 1975 New Year Honours.
