= Elizabeth Montgomery (designer) =

English artist and designer

- Born: Elizabeth Montgomery; 18 February 1902; Kidlington, Oxfordshire, England
- Died: 17 May 1993 (aged 91); Barnes, London, England
- Years active: 1932–1966
- Spouse: Patrick Wilmot
- Children: 1
- Parents: William Montgomery (father); Marta Montgomery (mother)
- Awards: Best Costume Design; 1958 The First Gentleman; Best Costume Design in a Play; 1961 Becket

Elizabeth Alice Marjorie Montgomery (18 February 1902 – 17 May 1993), married name Elizabeth Wilmot, was an English artist who earned fame as a theatre and opera costume and scenic designer, as part of the Motley Theatre Design Group. She was a two-time Tony Award winner for Best Costume Design.

== Biography ==
Montgomery was born in Kidlington, Oxfordshire, where her father, William Montgomery, was a curate. By the time she was three, the family had moved to Cambridge, where her father lectured in theology at St John's College. She showed an early talent for art, and attended art classes in Cambridge from the age of six. After the family moved to London, she continued her studies at the Westminster School of Art and had a painting exhibited in the Royal Academy summer exhibition. At the end of the 1920s she was a student at the Chelsea Illustrators Art School, where she met the sisters Sophie Harris and Margaret Harris. In 1932, Montgomery illustrated a book of poetry by W. H. Davies.

With Montgomery, Sophie and Margaret Harris formed a theatre design partnership known as Motley Theatre Design Group. The first full-scale production on which they worked was Romeo and Juliet for the Oxford University Dramatic Society (OUDS), John Gielgud's début as a director. The great success of this led to an invitation from Gielgud to design Gordon Daviot's Richard of Bordeaux, which opened at the New Theatre in St Martins Lane, London, in February 1933. The production was a huge success, achieving cult status, with playgoers queuing round the block every night. It is widely recognised that the success was partly owing to the Motley sets and costumes, which captured the essence of the period in an artistic rather than a slavishly historical sense, and were much admired for their beauty and lightness. This early recognition led to a busy and highly successful decade during which they became Gielgud's regular collaborators, working with him on such productions as his celebrated Romeo and Juliet (1935), in which he alternated the parts of Romeo and Mercutio with Laurence Olivier, and his Hamlet of 1936. They also formed a partnership with the celebrated French director Michel Saint-Denis, whose production of André Obey's Noah, starring Gielgud in the title role, they designed in 1935. Saint Denis went on to found The London Theatre Studio (1936–1939), a radical new theatre school which incorporated courses in theatre design taught by the Motleys. This was the first time theatre design had been taught within a drama school in the UK. In addition to their teaching and theatre work, the Motleys also opened a couture house in 1936.

At the beginning of the Second World War, Margaret Harris and Elizabeth Montgomery travelled to the United States to design a production of Romeo and Juliet for Laurence Olivier. They stayed in America until the end of the war, designing numerous successful productions on Broadway. When Margaret Harris returned to England in 1946, Elizabeth stayed in New York, where she married the writer and journalist Patrick Wilmot (1904–1960). Their son, John, was born in 1949. Elizabeth remained in New York until 1966, designing numerous successful plays, musicals, operas and ballets.
