= Lindsay Posner =

British theatre director (born 1959)

Lindsay Steven Posner (born 6 June 1959) is a British theatre director, known for his work in London's West End and at the Royal Court Theatre, the Royal Shakespeare Company and the National Theatre, particularly plays by David Mamet.

== Career ==
Posner graduated from the acting course at the Royal Academy of Dramatic Art in 1984. He was associate director of the Royal Court Theatre from 1987 to 1992 where his production of Death and the Maiden won two Laurence Olivier Awards.

He has directed five productions of David Mamet's plays, describing him as "America's greatest living playwright".

== Theatre ==
Posner was an associate director of the Royal Court Theatre between 1987 and 1992. During this time, he directed a number of new plays. Additionally, from 1989 he was appointed artistic director of Royal Court Theatre Upstairs and deputy director (to artistic director Max Stafford-Clark) for the main house.

During the late 2000s and early 2010s, he has had success with revivals of modern British comedies such as Relatively Speaking, Abigail's Party and Noises Off.

Theatre directed by Lindsay Posner
| Date | Play | Author | Theatre | Notes |
|---|---|---|---|---|
| 1986 | Ficky Stingers | Eve Lewis | Royal Court Upstairs | Staged as part of the 1986 Royal Court Young Writers' Festival |
| 1987 | Ambulance | Gregory Motton | Royal Court Upstairs | |
| 1987 | Downfall | Gregory Motton | Royal Court Upstairs | |
| 1987 | Built on Sand | Daniel Mornin | Royal Court Upstairs | |
| 1988 | Blood | Harwant Bains | Royal Court Upstairs | |
| 1989 | American Bagpipes | Iain Heggie | Royal Court | Featuring Lesley Manville and Ken Stott |
| 1990 | No One Sees the Video | Martin Crimp | Royal Court Upstairs | |
| 1991 | Death and the Maiden | Ariel Dorfman | Royal Court | Winner, Laurence Olivier Award for Best New Play |
| 1992 | Colquhoun and McBryde | John Byrne | Royal Court | |
| 1993 | The Treatment | Martin Crimp | Royal Court | |
| 1995 | The Robbers | Friedrich Schiller | Gate Theatre, Notting Hill | |
| 1995 | The Seagull | Anton Chekhov | Gate Theatre, Dublin | |
| 1997 | The Provok'd Wife | John Vanbrugh | The Old Vic | Featuring Michael Pennington and Victoria Hamilton |
| 1997 | American Buffalo | David Mamet | Young Vic | Featuring Douglas Henshall, Neil Stuke and Nicholas Woodeson |
| 1998 | After Darwin | Timberlake Wertenbaker | Hampstead Theatre | |
| 1999 | Volpone | Ben Jonson | RSC at The Swan | |
| 1999 | The Taming of the Shrew | William Shakespeare | RSC at The Pit | |
| 2000 | The Rivals | Richard Brinsley Sheridan | RSC at Stratford and the Barbican Theatre | Featuring Benjamin Whitrow and David Tennant |
| 2001 | Twelfth Night | William Shakespeare | RSC at Stratford and the Barbican Theatre | Featuring Guy Henry |
| 2002 | Tartuffe | Molière | Royal National Theatre | |
| 2003 | Power | Nick Dear | Royal National Theatre | |
| 2003 | Sexual Perversity in Chicago | David Mamet | Comedy Theatre | Featuring Matthew Perry, Hank Azaria and Minnie Driver |
| 2003 | The Lady from the Sea | Henrik Ibsen | Lyric Hammersmith and West Yorkshire Playhouse | Featuring Natasha Richardson |
| 2003 | The Caretaker | Harold Pinter | Bristol Old Vic | |
| 2004 | Oleanna | David Mamet | Garrick Theatre | Featuring Aaron Eckhart and Julia Stiles |
| 2005 | A Life in the Theatre | David Mamet | Apollo Theatre | |
| 2005 | The Birthday Party | Harold Pinter | Duchess Theatre | |
| 2005 | Romance | David Mamet | Almeida Theatre | Featuring John Mahoney |
| 2005 | The Hypochondriac | Molière | Almeida Theatre | Featuring Henry Goodman |
| 2006 | Tom & Viv | Michael Hastings | Almeida Theatre | Featuring Will Keen and Frances O'Connor |
| 2006 | Fool for Love | Sam Shepard | Apollo Theatre | Featuring Juliette Lewis and Martin Henderson |
| 2006 | The Misanthrope | Molière, adapted by Martin Crimp | Young Vic | Featuring Elizabeth McGovern and Ken Stott |
| 2007 | Fiddler on the Roof | Music by Jerry Bock, lyrics by Sheldon Harnick, book by Joseph Stein | Sheffield Crucible and the Savoy Theatre | Featuring Henry Goodman |
| 2008 | Carousel | Richard Rodgers and Oscar Hammerstein II | Savoy Theatre | Featuring Lesley Garrett |
| 2008 | Three Sisters on Hope Street | Diane Samuels and Tracy-Ann Oberman, based on Anton Chekhov's Three Sisters | Liverpool Everyman and Hampstead Theatre | |
| 2009 | Butley | Simon Gray | Duchess Theatre | |
| 2009 | An Ideal Husband | Oscar Wilde | Vaudeville Theatre | |
| 2009 | House of Games | Adapted by Richard Bean from the screenplay (of the film of the same name) by David Mamet | Almeida Theatre | |
| 2009 | A View from the Bridge | Arthur Miller | Duke of York's Theatre | Featuring Mary Elizabeth Mastrantonio and Ken Stott |
| 2011 | Noises Off | Michael Frayn | The Old Vic | |
| 2012 | Richard III | William Shakespeare | Old Globe Theatre, San Diego | |
| 2012 | Abigail's Party | Mike Leigh | Menier Chocolate Factory, Theatre Royal, Bath, and Wyndham's Theatre | |
| 2012 | Relatively Speaking | Alan Ayckbourn | Theatre Royal, Bath | |
| October 2012 | Uncle Vanya | Anton Chekhov, in a version by Christopher Hampton | Vaudeville Theatre | |
| January 2013 | The Turn of the Screw | Adapted by Rebecca Lenkiewicz from Henry James' novella of the same name | Almeida Theatre | |
| March 2013 | The Winslow Boy | Terence Rattigan | The Old Vic | |
| February 2016 | The End of Longing | Matthew Perry | Playhouse Theatre | |
| August 2018 | God of Carnage | Yasmina Reza | Theatre Royal, Bath | |
| November 2018 | Flare Path | Terence Rattigan | Embassy Theatre (London) | |
| November 2019 | Clybourne Park | Bruce Norris | Embassy Theatre (London) | |
| 2021 | Wicked | Winnie Holzman | Stage Theater Neue Flora (Hamburg) | |
| 2026 | The Truth | Florian Zeller | Apollo Theatre | |

== Opera ==
- Jenůfa by Leoš Janáček (1993) for the Opera Theatre Company in Dublin
- Giulio Cesare by George Frideric Handel (1998) for The Royal Opera at the Barbican Centre
- Man and Boy: Dada by Michael Nyman (2003) at the Almeida Theatre and in Jersey
- Love Counts by Michael Nyman (2006) at the Almeida Theatre

== Television ==
Posner has directed two television plays:

- The Maitlands (part of TV series Performance) in 1993, with Eileen Atkins, Bill Nighy, Harriet Walter, Jennifer Ehle, Edward Fox and Samuel West
- Two Oranges and a Mango in 1994, with Paul Bhattacharjee and Saeed Jaffrey
