= Motley Theatre Design Group =

Motley was the name of the theatre design firm made up of three English designers: sisters Margaret (known as "Percy," 1904–2000) and Sophie Harris (1900–1966) and Elizabeth Montgomery (1902–1993).

== Career ==
The name Motley, according to Montgomery, was chosen from the medieval fabric—a rough, multicolored woven called motley—not from Shakespeare's term of 'Motley' from As You Like It. The artists were constantly taunted with the Shakespearean connection anyway.

Motley met at art school in the 1920s and became John Gielgud's designers during the 1930s. They started teaching theatre design at Michel Saint-Denis's London Theatre Studio (1936–1939), the first time a design course had been incorporated into a drama school in the UK. Margaret Harris and Elizabeth Montgomery spent the Second World War in the United States, designing for Broadway, and Harris also worked with Charles Eames on his moulded plywood aeroplane parts. Sophie Harris, now married to George Devine, and mother of their child Harriet, stayed in the UK designing for stage and screen. After the war Margaret Harris returned to the UK, and both sisters once again joined Saint-Denis, teaching design at the Old Vic Theatre School (1947–1952). Elizabeth Montgomery stayed in the United States designing for many Broadway productions. All three continued to design under the name "Motley" for both stage and screen.

The Motley design team were closely associated with the work of the Shakespeare Memorial Theatre especially 1948–59. Productions included: 1948 Troilus and Cressida in which Paul Scofield played Troilus, the 1953 Antony and Cleopatra and 1957 As You Like It both featuring Peggy Ashcroft, The Merry Wives of Windsor in 1955 with Anthony Quayle, Hamlet in 1958 with Michael Redgrave in the title role, and Googie Withers as his mother, Gertrude; the production played in Moscow and Googie, who had moved to live in Australia with her actor and producer husband, John McCallum, was replaced by Coral Browne; and the 1959 King Lear with Charles Laughton.

In 1966, Margaret Harris founded Motley Theatre Design Course which continued until 2011.

The group won two Tony Awards for costume design and was nominated seven additional times.

== Motley Collection of Theatre and Costume Design ==
The Motley Collection of Theatre and Costume Design is a source of documentation on the history of theatre and is housed in the Rare Book and Special Collections Library at the University of Illinois at Urbana-Champaign. It is a collection of original materials on the theatre comprising over 5000 items from more than 150 productions in England and the United States. These materials include costume and set designs, sketches, notes, photographs, prop lists, storyboards, and swatches of fabric. After the members of the Motley Group had retired, Michael Mullin, a professor of English at the University of Illinois at Urbana-Champaign, met Margaret Harris and expressed an interest in the university acquiring the over 40 years worth of designs that the group had accumulated. After negotiations with Sotheby's, who had been contracted to auction the items, the University of Illinois finally reached an agreement in April 1981 to purchase the entire collection. This resource on the history of 20th-century theatre is preserved intact for study; the Library has digitised the collection in its entirety to make it publicly available.

== Work (Broadway selected) ==
- Look Homeward, Angel (1957) Tony Award for Best Costume Design (nominee)
- The Country Wife (1957) scenery and costume design; Tony Award Best Costume Design (nominee)
- Look Back in Anger (1957) Tony Award Best Costume Design (nominee)
- Shinbone Alley (1957) Tony Award Best Costume Design (nominee)
- The First Gentleman (1957) Tony Award Best Costume Design (winner)
- Becket (1961) Tony Award Best Costume Design (Dramatic) (winner)
- Kwamina (1961) Tony Award Best Costume Design (nominee)
- Mother Courage and Her Children (1963) Tony Award Best Costume Design (nominee)
- Baker Street (1965) Tony Award Best Costume Design (nominee)
