= Glen Byam Shaw =

English actor and theatre director (1904–1986)

Glen Byam Shaw CBE
- Shaw in The Vagabond Queen (1929)
- Born: Glencairn Alexander Byam Shaw; 13 December 1904; London, England
- Died: 29 April 1986 (aged 81)
- Education: Westminster School
- Occupation: Actor
- Years active: 1923–1981
- Military career
- Allegiance: United Kingdom
- Branch: British Army
- Service years: 1940–1945
- Rank: Major
- Unit: Royal Scots
- Conflicts: Second World War

Glencairn Alexander "Glen" Byam Shaw, CBE (13 December 1904 – 29 April 1986) was an English actor and theatre director, known for his dramatic productions in the 1950s and his operatic productions in the 1960s and later.

In the 1920s and 1930s Byam Shaw was a successful actor, both in romantic leads and in character parts. He worked frequently with his old friend John Gielgud. After working as co-director with Gielgud at the end of the 1930s, he preferred to direct rather than act. He served in the armed forces during the Second World War, and then took leading directorial posts at the Old Vic, the Shakespeare Memorial Theatre and Sadler's Wells (later known as the English National Opera).

== Life and career ==
=== Early years ===
Byam Shaw was born in London, the youngest of five siblings (four sons and one daughter) born to artist John Byam Liston Shaw and his wife, Caroline Evelyn Eunice Pyke-Nott (1870–1959), also an artist. He was educated at Westminster School, where his contemporaries included his elder brother, James Byam Shaw, later a well-known art historian, and John Gielgud, who became a lifelong friend and professional colleague.

The actor Michael Denison, biographer of Byam Shaw in the Oxford Dictionary of National Biography writes that Byam Shaw made his professional stage debut in August 1923 with no prior training. Denison speculates that Byam Shaw's cousin, actress May Ward, a close friend of Dame Ellen Terry, "may have been enough to make him take the plunge". The Times said of him, "Tall, gentle, and graceful in movement, he was valuable in any cast, particularly in classics and in the Russian plays."

Byam Shaw's first appearance was at Torquay in the west of England, in C. K. Munro's comedy At Mrs. Beam's. In 1925 he made his London debut, playing Yasha in J.B. Fagan's production of The Cherry Orchard, in a cast that included Alan Napier as Gaiev, O.B. Clarence as Firs and Gielgud as the young student Trofimov. Over the next few years Byam Shaw appeared in three more plays by Chekhov, and in plays by Strindberg and Ibsen. He made his New York debut in November 1927 as Pelham Humphrey in And So To Bed.

Actress Constance Collier was impressed by Byam Shaw and used her influence to gain him roles. Among those to whom she introduced him was Ivor Novello, then a leading figure in London theatre. She directed them both in the play Down Hill in 1926. This drew him into contact with the poet Siegfried Sassoon, a friend of Collier; he and Byam Shaw became close. Their friendship lasted for the rest of Sassoon's life, although they ceased to be partners quite quickly; Sassoon became involved with Stephen Tennant and Byam Shaw fell in love with actress Angela Baddeley. They married in 1929. The marriage, which lasted until her death in 1976, was, Denison writes, "a supremely happy one, both domestically and professionally"; the couple had a son and a daughter.

=== 1930s and Second World War ===
Byam Shaw and Baddeley toured together in South Africa in 1931, in a repertory of three plays. The following year, Byam Shaw appeared at the Lyceum in Max Reinhardt's mime play The Miracle, with Lady Diana Cooper as the Madonna, Tilly Losch as the nun and Leonid Massine as the Spielmann. In 1933, Byam Shaw took over from Gielgud as Richard II in the long-running play Richard of Bordeaux by 'Gordon Daviot' (Josephine Tey); the following year he played Darnley in another historical play by the same author, Queen of Scots, opposite Gwen Ffrangcon-Davies and Laurence Olivier, directed by Gielgud.

Byam Shaw continued to work with Gielgud, playing Laertes to his Hamlet in 1934, and Benvolio in the celebrated 1935 New Theatre production of Romeo and Juliet with Peggy Ashcroft as Juliet, Edith Evans as the Nurse and Gielgud and Olivier alternating the roles of Romeo and Mercutio. During that New season, Gielgud invited Byam Shaw to join him in directing Richard II for the Oxford University Dramatic Society. Denison, who was in the cast, describes Byam Shaw as "stimulating, firm, and courteous to his undergraduate cast". Byam Shaw enjoyed the experience of directing, and never having especially enjoyed acting he turned gladly to direction.

Gielgud engaged Byam Shaw to direct Dodie Smith's Dear Octopus in 1938 with a cast including Gielgud, Marie Tempest, Kate Cutler and Baddeley. Byam Shaw concluded his acting career in the late 1930s in roles including Darcy in a dramatisation of Pride and Prejudice, character parts in The Merchant of Venice and Richard II, and Sir Benjamin Backbite in The School for Scandal. After appearing in Michel Saint-Denis's short season at the Phoenix Theatre in 1938, his final role was Horatio to Gielgud's Hamlet, both in London and at Elsinore Castle.

As the Second World War loomed, Byam Shaw joined the emergency reserve of officers. On 3 January 1940, he was commissioned into the Royal Scots as a second lieutenant. He served in Burma from 1942 and was wounded. He ended his military service in 1945 as a major, making training films in India. While in Burma Byam Shaw conceived a production of Antony and Cleopatra dressed in the costumes of Shakespeare's time, rather than those of Ancient Rome and Egypt. On his return to civilian life, he directed it at the Piccadilly Theatre in 1946, with Godfrey Tearle and Edith Evans. The Manchester Guardian called his production "a very adroit and finished piece of work."

=== Old Vic and Stratford ===
Between 1947 and 1951 Byam Shaw was the director of the Old Vic Theatre School, part of the Old Vic Theatre run by Michel Saint-Denis which also included the Young Vic run by George Devine. Denison writes "Despite much success in all fields the three partners fell foul of the Vic governors and of the theatre's top-heavy and largely hostile administration". The same board had earlier dismissed Ralph Richardson and Laurence Olivier as heads of the Old Vic company, and now lost another leading team when Saint-Denis, Devine and Byan Shaw resigned in 1951.

From 1952 to 1959 Byam Shaw was director of the Shakespeare Memorial Theatre in Stratford-upon-Avon, first as co-director with Anthony Quayle, and in sole charge from 1956 to 1959. He was appointed CBE in 1954. He directed 14 plays at Stratford; Denison singles out Antony and Cleopatra with Michael Redgrave and Ashcroft, Macbeth with Olivier and Vivien Leigh, As You Like It with Ashcroft, Othello with Harry Andrews and Emlyn Williams, and King Lear with Charles Laughton and Albert Finney. Before the 1950s, Stratford seasons had been widely regarded as worthy but unexciting. Under Quayle and Byam Shaw Stratford became one of the principal centres of British theatre, attracting the leading directors such as Gielgud, Peter Hall and Peter Brook. In 1959, he handed over to Hall, whom he had chosen as his successor.

=== Opera ===
In 1962, despite describing himself as tone deaf, Byam Shaw accepted the post of director of productions at Sadler's Wells Opera. He worked closely with the company's managing director, Norman Tucker, and musical director, Colin Davis. Tucker's successor, Lord Harewood, recalled "a series of striking productions, including The Rake's Progress, Così fan tutte, Der Freischütz and A Masked Ball ... a notable elegant and witty Die Fledermaus, Hansel and Gretel ... and Gluck's Orpheus."

Byam Shaw's most celebrated opera productions were in collaboration with the conductor Reginald Goodall, first The Mastersingers, the company's last major production at Sadler's Wells Theatre, and, after its move to the London Coliseum in 1968, the four operas of Wagner's Ring cycle, in which Byam Shaw's co-director was his former assistant John Blatchley. Byam Shaw's last collaboration with Goodall was Tristan and Isolde in 1981.

He was appointed a Commander of the Order of the British Empire (CBE) in the 1954 New Year Honours in recognition of his work as director of the Shakespeare Memorial Theatre, Stratford-upon-Avon. He received an honorary DLitt from the University of Birmingham in 1959.

== Death ==
Glen Byam Shaw died in Goring-on-Thames at the age of 81, survived by his children and extended family.
