= André Obey =

French playwright (1892–1975)

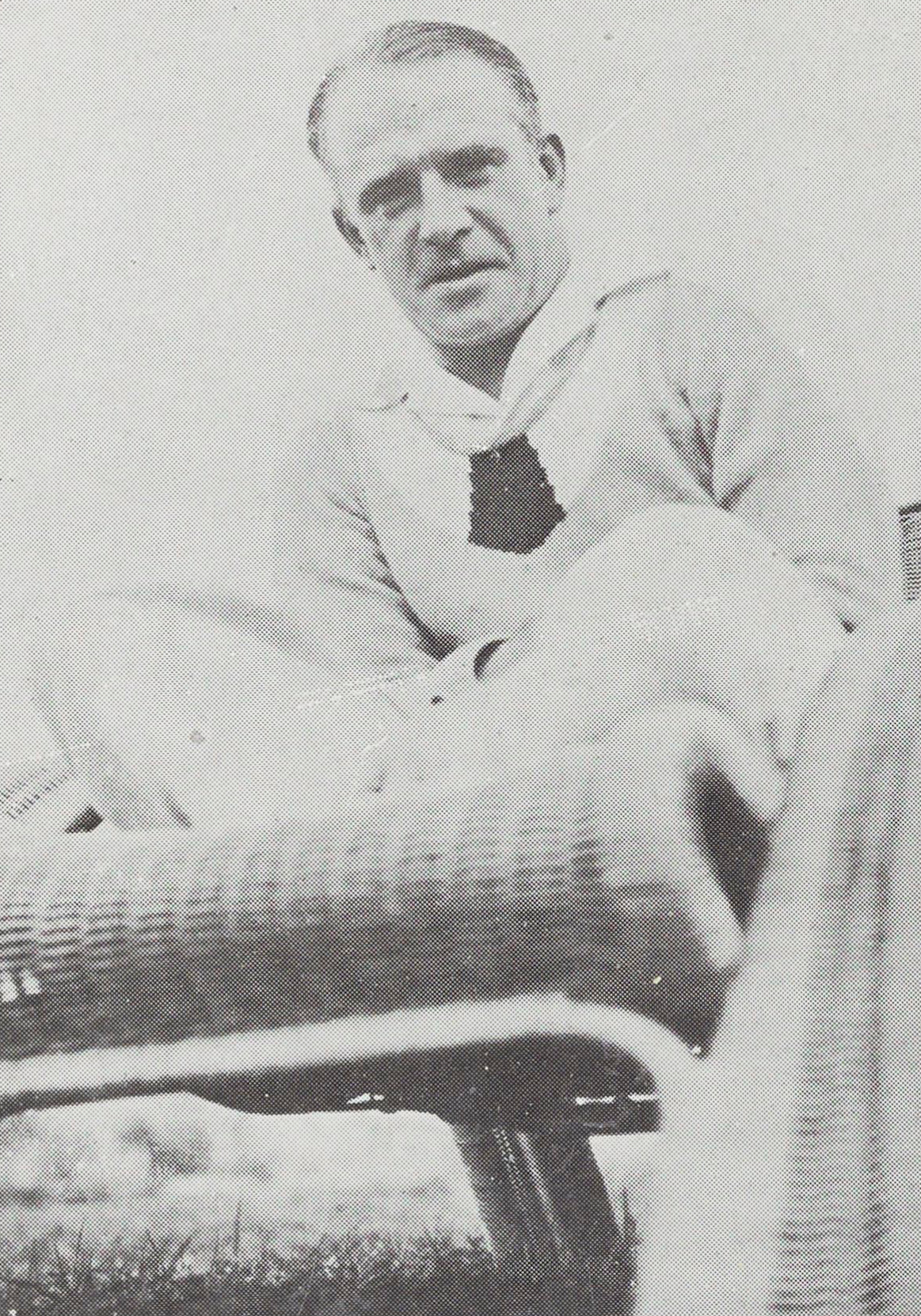
André Obey

André Obey (French: [ɔbɛ]; 8 May 1892 at Douai, France – 11 April 1975 at Montsoreau, near the river Loire) was a prominent French playwright during the inter-war years and into the 1950s.

He began as a novelist and produced an autobiographical novel about his adolescence le Joueur de triangle (The Triangle Player). After he met with Jacques Copeau, he devoted himself completely to dramatic works. In 1945 Obey became provisional general administrator of the Comédie-Française. He was made full general administrator in 1946, and resigned in 1947 after just under a year's service.

Obey's play Le Viol de Lucrèce was drawn on by Ronald Duncan for the libretto of Benjamin Britten's opera The Rape of Lucretia.

Obey served as general administrator of the Comédie-Française, in a provisional capacity from October 1945 until 6 April 1946, then with full powers until his resignation on 5 February 1947.

== Bibliography ==
=== Novels ===
- Le joueur de triangle (The Triangle Player)/ 1928

=== Theatre ===
- La Souriante Madame Beudet (The Smiling Madame Beudet)/ 1921: Nouveau théâtre, premiere, April 1921. 1921: Broadway November 28, 1921 - December 1921
- Noé (Noah)/ 1931: Broadway February 13, 1935 - March 1935
- Le Viol de Lucrèce (The Rape of Lucretia)/ 1931: Broadway December 20, 1932 - January 1933
- La Bataille de la Marne (The Battle of the Marne)/ 1932
- La Carcasse (The Carcass)/ 1926
- Noah / 1935
- Lazare (Lazarus)/ 1950
- L'Orestie/ 1955
- Les trois coups de minuit/ 1957: English translation as Frost at Midnight by Warren Tute
- Revenu de l'étoile (Returned from the star)/ 1965

== Reviews ==
- "Theater: New Play in Manhattan". Time. February 25, 1935. Archived from the original on December 22, 2011.
