= Michel Saint-Denis =

French actor and drama theorist (1897–1971)

Michel Jacques Saint-Denis
- Born: 13 September 1897; Beauvais, France
- Died: 31 July 1971 (aged 73); Westminster, England
- Other names: Jacques Duchesne
- Occupation(s): Actor, theatre director, drama theorist

Michel Jacques Saint-Denis (13 September 1897 – 31 July 1971), dit Jacques Duchesne, was a French actor, theatre director, and drama theorist whose ideas on actor training have had a profound influence on the development of European theatre from the 1930s on.

== Life and career ==
Saint-Denis was born in Beauvais, the nephew of Jacques Copeau, who had founded the Théâtre du Vieux-Colombier in 1913. Saint-Denis was exposed to theatre early in his life. He joined Copeau's troupe in 1919, after their return from New York City, where they had performed for two years. Saint-Denis was greatly influenced by Copeau's approach to theatre taught at his Ecole du Vieux-Colombier, which embraced not only the play on stage but also the actor training itself. He soon became Copeau's right-hand man, like Charles Dullin or Louis Jouvet before him. Together with other members of the troupe of the Vieux-Colombier, he followed his uncle to Burgundy in 1924, where they formed a new troupe that would become famous as les Copiaus.

In 1929, Michel Saint-Denis together with some other members of the Copiaus and with the help of Copeau, moved to Paris and set up the Compagnie des Quinze, transporting Copeau's teachings on international stages to wide acclaim. In 1935, he accepted an invitation to London, where he founded the London Theatre Studio, together with George Devine and Marius Goring, an actor school where he introduced Copeau's and his own concepts from his earlier experience in France. Working together with established actors like Alec Guinness, Peter Ustinov, Michael Redgrave, John Gielgud or Laurence Olivier, he soon became known as a renowned director. At one time, he also co-directed the Royal Shakespeare Company.

During World War II, he worked for the French Service of the BBC, Radio Londres, under the pseudonym of "Jacques Duchesne", and was a regular participant in the programme Les Français parlent aux Français. After the war, Saint-Denis founded a new theatre school at the damaged Old Vic that existed from 1947 to 1952.

In 1952, Saint-Denis accepted a call by the Centre Dramatique de l'Est first at Colmar, and then—since 1953—at Strasbourg, where he founded the Ecole Supérieure d'Art Dramatique at the Théâtre national. After his retirement for health reasons in 1957, he taught at the Juilliard School in New York, where he instituted the Juilliard Drama School, and served as an advisor to the National Theatre School of Canada. In 1961 he was named artistic advisor at the new Royal Shakespeare Company, and in 1966 he appeared as a storyteller on the BBC children's programme Jackanory narrating in five episodes.

== Death ==
Having suffered from health problems for a long time, Michel Saint-Denis died in Westminster from a stroke, aged 73.

== Filmography ==
=== Actor ===
Year	Title	Role	Notes
1936	Secret Agent	Coachman	Film debut, uncredited
1962	A Man Alone	Himself	Final film

=== Producer ===
Year	Title	Notes
1939	Twelfth Night	TV, Movie
1951	The Black Arrow	TV, Serial

=== Director ===
Year	Title	Notes
1939	Twelfth Night	TV, Movie

== Selected bibliography ==
- Saint-Denis, M.: Theatre, a Rediscovery of Style; New York, Theatre Arts Books; 1963.
- Saint-Denis, M.: Training for the Theatre: premises and promises, New York, Theatre Arts Books; 1982.
