= List of Miranda Richardson performances =

Miranda Richardson filmography
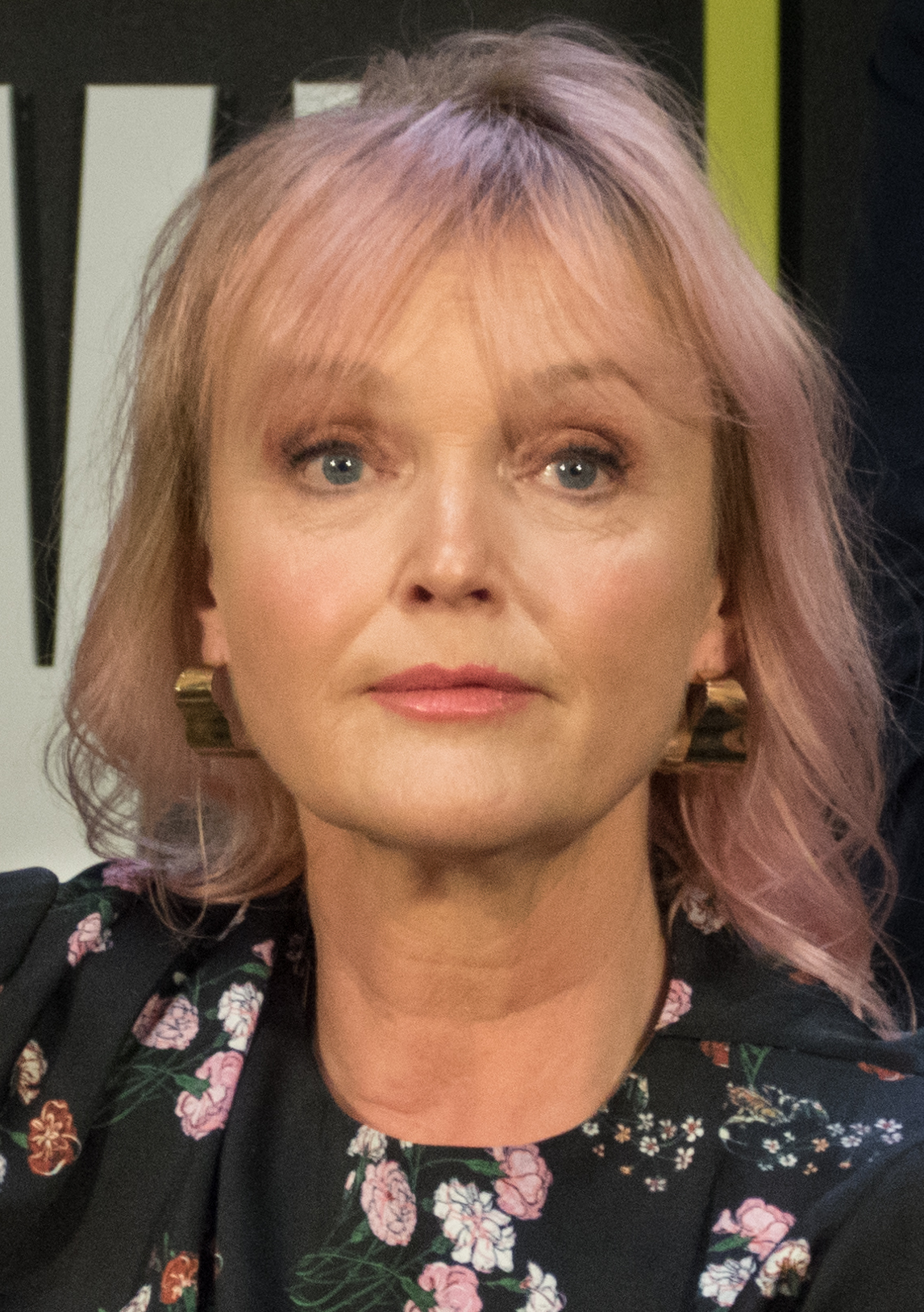
- Richardson at the New York Comic Con for Good Omens in 2018
- Film: 59
- Television: 67
- Theatre: 28

Miranda Richardson is an English actress who has worked in TV, films, and theatre.

== Films ==
Year	Title	Role	Notes	Notes
1980	The First Day	Student	Short film	
1985	Dance with a Stranger	Ruth Ellis	Evening Standard British Film Award for Best Actress; Variety Club Award	
1985	Underworld	Oriel		
1985	The Innocent	Mary Turner		
1987	Eat the Rich	DHSS Blonde		
1987	Empire of the Sun	Mrs. Victor		
1989	Twisted Obsession	Marilyn		
1990	The Bachelor	Frederica / Widow		
1990	The Fool	Columbine / Rosalind / Ophelia		
1991	Broken Skin	Mother	Short film	
1992	The Crying Game	Jude	New York Film Critics Circle Award for Best Supporting Actress; Nominated—BAFTA Award for Best Actress in a Supporting Role	
1992	Damage	Ingrid Fleming	BAFTA Award for Best Actress in a Supporting Role; London Film Critics' Circle Award for Best British Actress; New York Film Critics Circle Award for Best Supporting Actress; Nominated—Academy Award for Best Supporting Actress; Nominated—Golden Globe Award for Best Supporting Actress – Motion Picture	
1992	Enchanted April	Rose Arbuthnot	Golden Globe Award for Best Actress – Motion Picture Musical or Comedy; New York Film Critics Circle Award for Best Supporting Actress	
1993	Century	Clara		
1993	The Line, the Cross and the Curve	Mysterious woman	Short film	
1994	Tom & Viv	Vivienne Haigh-Wood	National Board of Review Award for Best Actress; Nominated—Academy Award for Best Actress; Nominated—BAFTA Award for Best Actress in a Leading Role; Nominated—Golden Globe Award for Best Actress in a Motion Picture – Drama	
1995	The Night and the Moment	Julie		
1996	The Evening Star	Patsy Carpenter	Society of Texas Film Critics Award for Best Supporting Actress also for Kansas City; Nominated—Satellite Award for Best Supporting Actress – Motion Picture	
1996	Kansas City	Carolyn Stilton	Society of Texas Film Critics Award for Best Supporting Actress also for The Evening Star	
1996	Swann	Sarah Maloney		
1997	The Designated Mourner	Judy		
1997	The Apostle	Toosie	Nominated—Independent Spirit Award for Best Supporting Female	
1999	Sleepy Hollow	Lady Mary Van Tassel / Crone	Blockbuster Entertainment Award for Favorite Supporting Actress – Horror; Nominated—Saturn Award for Best Supporting Actress	
1999	The King and I	Anna Leonowens	Voice only Nominated—London Film Critics' Circle Award for Best British Actress	
1999	Jacob Two Two Meets the Hooded Fang	Miss Fowl		
2000	Get Carter	Gloria Carter		
2000	Chicken Run	Mrs. Tweedy	Voice only	
2000	The Miracle Maker	Mary Magdalene	Voice only	
2000	The Magic of Vincent	Anne Saunders	Short film	
2002	The Hours	Vanessa Bell	Nominated—Phoenix Film Critics Society Award for Best Cast; Nominated—Screen Actors Guild Award for Outstanding Performance by a Cast in a Motion Picture	
2002	Spider	Yvonne/Mrs. Cleg	San Francisco Film Critics Circle Award for Best Supporting Actress; Sant Jordi Award for Best Foreign Actress; Toronto Film Critics Association Award for Best Supporting Actress; Nominated—Chicago Film Critics Association Award for Best Supporting Actress; Nominated—London Film Critics' Circle Award for Best British Actress; Nominated—Satellite Award for Best Supporting Actress – Motion Picture	
2003	The Actors	Mrs. Magnani		
2003	The Rage in Placid Lake	Sylvia Lake	Nominated—AACTA Award for Best Actress in a Supporting Role; Nominated—Film Critics Circle of Australia Award for Best Supporting Actor – Female	
2003	Falling Angels	Mary Field		
2004	The Prince and Me	Queen Rosalind		
2004	Churchill: The Hollywood Years	Eva Braun		
2004	The Phantom of the Opera	Madame Giry		
2005	Midsummer Dream	Queen Titania	Voice only	
2005	Harry Potter and the Goblet of Fire	Rita Skeeter		
2006	Wah-Wah	Lauren Compton		
2007	Provoked	Veronica Scott		
2007	Paris, je t'aime	The Wife	Segment: "Bastille"	
2007	Fred Claus	Mrs. Annette Claus		
2007	Southland Tales	Nana Mae Van Adler-Frost		
2008	Puffball	Mabs Tucker		
2009	The Young Victoria	Duchess of Kent		
2009	A Fox's Tale	Anna Conda	Voice only	
2009	Spinning into Butter	Catherine Kenney		
2010	Made in Dagenham	Barbara Castle	Nominated—BAFTA Award for Best Actress in a Supporting Role	
2010	Harry Potter and the Deathly Hallows: Part 1	Rita Skeeter	Cameo	
2013	Belle	Lady Ashford		
2014	Muppets Most Wanted	Berliner at Window		
2014	Maleficent	Queen Ulla	Scenes deleted	
2015	Testament of Youth	Miss Hilda Lorimer		
2017	iBoy	Nan		
2017	Churchill	Clementine Churchill		
2017	Stronger	Patty Bauman		
2020	Rams	Kat		
2022	The House	Aunt Clarice	Voice only	
2023	The Magician's Elephant	Madam LaVaughn	Voice only	
2023	Chicken Run: Dawn of the Nugget	Mrs. Tweedy	Voice only	
2025	The Yellow Tie	older Ioana		
TBA	My Duchess †		Post-production	
TBA	The Queen of Fashion †	Helen Delves Broughton	Post-production	
TBA	The Custom of the Country †		Post-production	
TBA	Dinner with Audrey †	Ella van Heemstra	Post-production	

== Television ==
Year	Title	Role	Notes
1981	Agony	Gudrun	TV series (1 episode: "From Here to Maternity")
1982	The Further Adventures of Lucky Jim	Chrissie Collin	TV series (1 episode)
1983	The Hard Word	Polly Wood	TV series (5 episodes)
1983	Crown Court	Susan Palmer	TV series (1 episode: "A Matter of Trust")
1984	Sorrell and Son	Lola	TV episode
1985	A Woman of Substance	Paula McGill Amory	TV miniseries (2 episodes)
1985	The Death of the Heart	Daphne Heccomb	TV film
1986	Blackadder II	Queenie	TV series (6 episodes)
1986	Saturday Live	"Third Man" Actress	TV series (1 episode)
1986	Shades of Darkness	Gina	TV series (1 episode: "The Demon Lover")
1986	Unnatural Causes	Anne Forrest	TV series (1 episode: "Lost Property")
1987	After Pilkington	Penny	TV film Nominated—BAFTA Television Award for Best Actress
1987	The South Bank Show	Mary Shelley	TV series (1 episode: "Frankenstein and Dracula")
1987	Blackadder the Third	Amy Hardwood	TV series (1 episode: "Amy and Amiability")
1988	Sweet as You Are	Julia Perry	TV film Royal Television Society Award for Best Performance – Female
1988	A Night of Comic Relief	Woman with Phone	TV special
1988	The Master Builder	Hilde Wangel	TV film
1988	The Storyteller	Witch	TV series (1 episode: "The Three Ravens")
1988	Mountain Language	Young Woman	TV version of stage play
1988	Blackadder's Christmas Carol	Queen Elizabeth I / Queen Asphyxia XIX	TV special
1989	A Night of Comic Relief 2	"Fatal Overacting" Actress	TV special
1989	Blackadder Goes Forth	Nurse Mary Fletcher-Brown	TV series (1 episode: "General Hospital")
1989	Cracking Up	Mary Wollstonecraft	TV series (1 episode: "The Rights of Man and the Wrongs of Woman")
1989	Ball Trap on the Cote Sauvage	Early Bird	TV film
1989	Smith and Jones	Meryl Catty	TV series (3 episodes)
1990	10x10	Olivia	TV series (1 episode: "Secret Friends")
1990	Die Kinder	Sidonie Reiger	TV series (6 episodes)
1990–1993	The Comic Strip Presents...	Various characters	TV series (4 episodes)
1991	Redemption	Valerie Paris	TV film
1991	Old Times	Anna	TV film
1992	Mr. Wakefield's Crusade	Sandra	TV series (1 episode)
1992	The True Adventures of Christopher Columbus	Queen Isabella	TV miniseries (4 episodes)
1993	Saturday Night Live	Host	TV series (1 episode: "Miranda Richardson/Soul Asylum")
1994	Fatherland	Charlie Maguire	Golden Globe Award for Best Supporting Actress – Series, Miniseries or Television Film
1994–2004	Absolutely Fabulous	Bettina	TV series (2 episodes)
1996	Saint-Ex	Consuelo de Saint-Exupéry	TV film
1997	A Dance to the Music of Time	Pamela Flitton	TV miniseries (2 episodes); Nominated—BAFTA Television Award for Best Actress; Nominated—Royal Television Society Award for Best Performance – Female
1998	The Scold's Bridle	Dr Sarah Blakeney	TV miniseries (2 episodes)
1998	Merlin	Queen Mab / Lady of the Lake	TV miniseries (2 episodes); Nominated - Golden Globe Award for Best Actress in a Miniseries or Motion Picture Made for Television
1998	Ted and Ralph	Henrietta Blough-Pendleton	TV special
1999	Alice in Wonderland	Queen of Hearts / Society Woman	TV film
1999	St. Ives	Miss Gilchrist	TV film
1999	The Big Brass Ring	Dinah Pellarin	TV film Nominated—Golden Globe Award for Best Supporting Actress – Series, Miniseries or Television Film
1999	Blackadder: Back & Forth	Lady Elizabeth / Queen Elizabeth I (Queenie)	TV special
2001	The Fantastic Flying Journey	Lucretia Moore	TV series (13 episodes); Voice only
2001	Snow White: The Fairest of Them All	Queen Elspeth	TV film
2003	The Lost Prince	Queen Mary	TV miniseries (2 episodes); Nominated—BAFTA Television Award for Best Actress; Nominated—Golden Globe Award for Best Actress in a Miniseries or Motion Picture Made for Television
2003	Comic Relief: The Big Hair Do	Hermione Granger	TV special
2005–2006	The Adventures of Bottle Top Bill	Corky the Horse	TV series (26 episodes); Voice only
2006	Gideon's Daughter	Stella	TV film Nominated—Satellite Award for Best Actress – Miniseries or Television Film
2006	Merlin's Apprentice	Lady of the Lake	TV miniseries (2 episodes)
2007	The Life and Times of Vivienne Vyle	Helena	TV series (6 episodes)
2010	Rubicon	Katherine Rhumor	TV series (13 episodes)
2012	Dead Boss	Jo	TV series (1 episode)
2012	Parade's End	Mrs. Wannop	TV miniseries (5 episodes)
2012	World Without End	Mother Cecilia	TV series (6 episodes)
2014	Psychobitches	Enid Blyton	TV series (1 episode)
2014	The Incredible Adventures of Professor Branestawm	Miss Blitherington	TV special
2014	Mapp and Lucia	Miss Elizabeth Mapp	TV miniseries (3 episodes)
2015	Casanova	Marquise d'Urfe	TV pilot
2015	An Inspector Calls	Sybil Birling	TV film
2015	And Then There Were None	Miss Emily Brent	TV miniseries (2 episodes)
2016	Walliams and Friend	Various	TV series (1 episode: "Miranda Richardson")
2016–2018	Danger Mouse	Queen of Weevils	TV series (3 episodes); Voice only
2018	Girlfriends	Sue Thackery	TV series (6 episodes)
2019	Pinky Malinky	Pinky's Grandma	TV series (3 episodes); Voice only
2019	Curfew	Lou Collins	TV series (7 episodes)
2019, 2023	Good Omens	Madame Tracy / Shax	11 episodes
2021	Modern Love	Jane	TV series (1 episode: "Strangers on a (Dublin) Train")
2022	Fate: The Winx Saga	Rosalind	Main role (season 2)
2025	The Last Anniversary	Rose	6 episodes
TBA	The Portrait of a Lady †	Mrs. Touchett	Upcoming six-part series

== Theatre roles ==
Year	Title	Role	Venue	Ref.	Notes
	Savage Amusement	Hazel	Derby Playhouse, Lancaster		
1978	Stags and Hens	Linda	Derby Playhouse, Lancaster		
	All My Sons	Ann	Derby Playhouse, Lancaster		
	Sisterly Feelings	Brenda	Derby Playhouse, Lancaster		
	Ten Times Table	Phillipa	Library Theatre, Manchester		
	Whose Life Is It Anyway?	Kay Sadler	Library Theatre, Manchester		
	Play It Again, Sam	Linda Christie	Library Theatre, Manchester		
	Tom Jones	Sophie Western	Library Theatre, Manchester		
	Educating Rita	Rita	Haymarket Theatre, Leicester		
1981	Moving	Jane Gladwin	Queen's Theatre		
1983	The Table of the Two Horseman	Katie Wyld	Bristol Theatre Royal		
1983	The Maids	Madame	Bristol New Vic		
1983	Insignificance	The Actress	Bristol New Vic		
1984	Life of Einstein		The Dukes Theatre, Lancaster		
1985	Edmond	Glenna	Newcastle		
1987	A Lie of the Mind	Beth	Royal Court Theatre, West End		Nominated - Olivier Award for Best Actress
1988	The Changeling	Beatrice-Joanna	Royal Court Theatre, West End		
1988	Mountain Language	Young Woman	(Lyttelton) National Theatre, West End		
1990	Etta Jenks	Etta Jenks	Royal Court Theatre, West End		
1996	The Designated Mourner	Judy	Royal National Theatre, West End		
1996	Orlando	Orlando	50th Edinburgh International Festival		
1999	Aunt Dan and Lemon	Aunt Dan	Almeida Theatre, Islington, London		
2002	The Play What I Wrote	Herself	Wyndham's Theatre, West End		
2005	Comic Aid 2005	Herself	Carling Apollo, West End		
2005	One Knight Only	Herself	Theatre Royal, Haymarket, West End		
2009	Grasses of a thousand colours	Cerise	Royal Court Theatre		
2019	La fille du régiment	Duchesse de Crakentorp	Royal Opera House		
