= A Life in the Theatre (disambiguation) =

A Life in the Theatre is a 1977 play by David Mamet.

A Life in the Theatre may also refer to:

- A Life in the Theatre (1979 film), starring Peter Evans and Ellis Rabb
- A Life in the Theatre (1993 film), starring Matthew Broderick and Jack Lemmon
