= List of awards and nominations received by Miranda Richardson =

Miranda Richardson awards and nominations
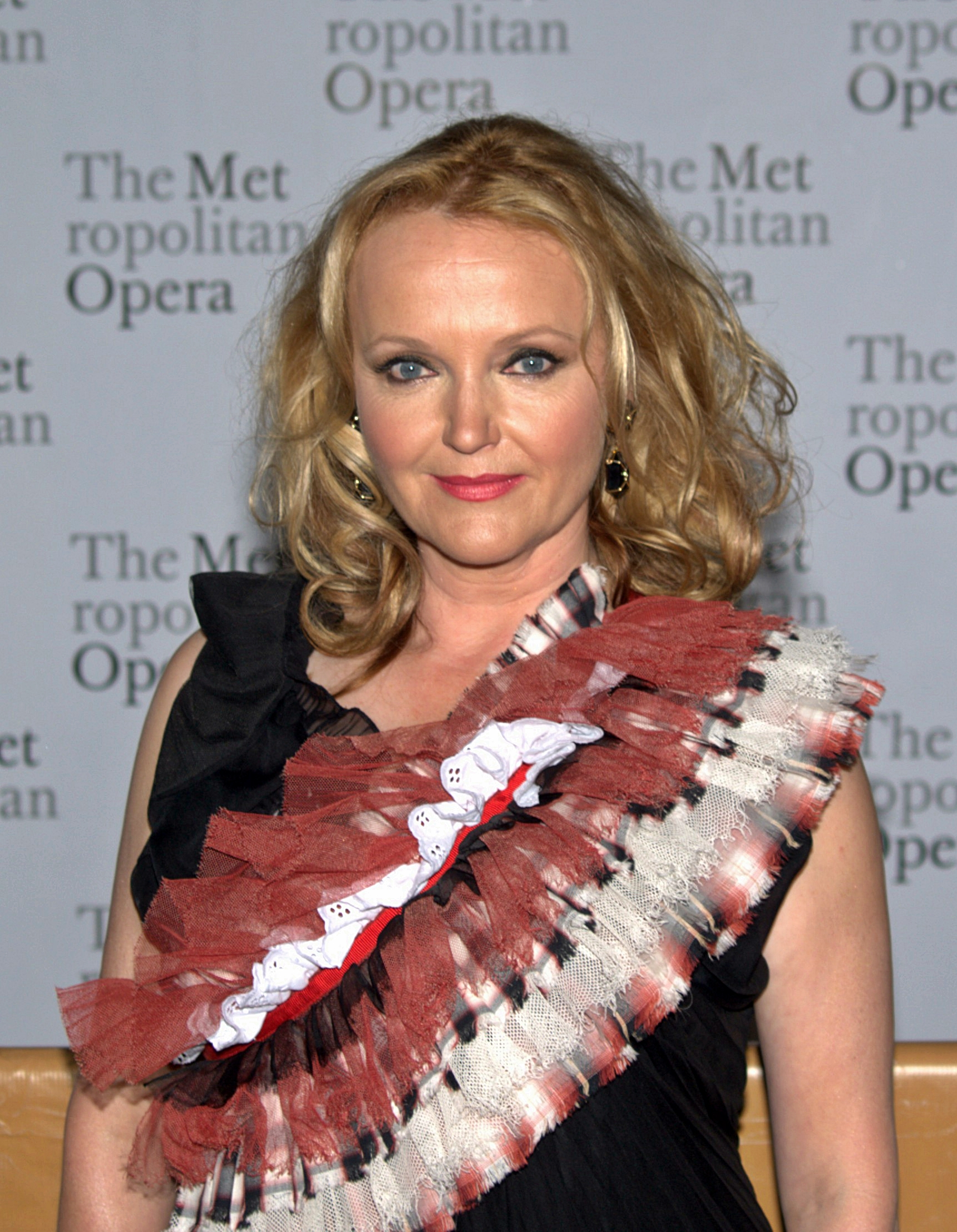
- Richardson in 2010
Awards and nominations
Award	Wins	Nominations
Academy Awards	0	2
Actor Awards	0	1
BAFTA Film Awards	1	4
BAFTA TV Awards	0	3
Golden Globes	2	7
Laurence Olivier Awards	0	1
Primetime Emmy Awards	0	1

Totals (Note: Certain award groups do not simply award one winner. They acknowledge several different recipients, have runners-up, and have third place. Since this is a specific recognition and is different from losing an award, runner-up mentions are considered wins in this award tally. For simplification and to avoid errors, each award in this list has been presumed to have had a prior nomination.)
- Wins: 16
- Nominations: 49

Miranda Richardson is an English actress. Known for her performances on stage and screen across a wide range of dramatic and comedic roles, she has received numerous accolades, including a British Academy Film Award (BAFTA) and two Golden Globes, as well as nominations for two Academy Awards, an Actor Award, three BAFTA TV Awards, a Laurence Olivier Award, and a Primetime Emmy Award.

After making her debut on stage in 1981, Richardson was nominated for the Laurence Olivier Award for Best Actress for the Sam Shepard's 1985 play A Lie of the Mind. At the very start of the next decade, she had her breakthrough on the screen thanks to the release of the period drama film Enchanted April (1991), the chrime thriller The Crying Game, and the romantic drama Damage (both 1992). She received a double nomination for the BAFTA Award for Best Actress in a Supporting Role for both Damage and The Crying Game, winning for the former, while Enchanted April won her the Golden Globe Award for Best Actress in a Motion Picture – Musical or Comedy. Damage also earned her nominations for the Academy Award for Best Supporting Actress and the Golden Globe Award for Best Supporting Actress – Motion Picture. For her portrayal of Vivienne Haigh-Wood in the historical drama Tom & Viv (1994), she received nominations for the Academy Award for Best Actress, the BAFTA Award for Best Actress in a Leading Role, and the Golden Globe Award for Best Actress in a Motion Picture – Drama. Her other film credits include the Tim Burton's horror Sleepy Hollow (1999), earning a nomination for the Saturn Award for Best Supporting Actress, the period drama The Hours (2002), nominated for the Actor Award for Outstanding Performance by a Cast in a Motion Picture, and the comedy-drama Made in Dagenham (2010), for which she received a fourth BAFTA Award nomination.

Richardson's television work features the BAFTA TV Award-nominated roles After Pilkington (1987), A Dance to the Music of Time (1997), and The Lost Prince (2003). She has also won the Golden Globe Award for Best Supporting Actress – Series, Miniseries or Television Film for the television film Fatherland (1994), and received nominations for the Golden Globe Award for Best Actress – Miniseries or Television Film for her performance as Queen Mab and the Lady of the Lake in Merlin (1998) and the Primetime Emmy Award for Outstanding Narrator for the National Geographic's special Operation Orangutan (2015).

== Awards and nominations ==
Award	Year	Category	Work	Result	Ref.
Academy Awards	1993	Best Supporting Actress	Damage	Nominated	
Academy Awards	1995	Best Actress	Tom & Viv	Nominated	
Actor Awards	2003	Outstanding Performance by a Cast in a Motion Picture	The Hours	Nominated	
AACTA Awards	2003	Best Supporting Actress	The Rage in Placid Lake	Nominated	
British Academy Film Awards	1993	Best Actress in a Supporting Role	Damage	Won	
British Academy Film Awards	1993	Best Actress in a Supporting Role	The Crying Game	Nominated	
British Academy Film Awards	1994	Best Actress in a Leading Role	Tom & Viv	Nominated	
British Academy Film Awards	2011	Best Actress in a Supporting Role	Made in Dagenham	Nominated	
British Academy Television Awards	1988	Best Actress	After Pilkington	Nominated	
British Academy Television Awards	1998	Best Actress	A Dance to the Music of Time	Nominated	
British Academy Television Awards	2004	Best Actress	The Lost Prince	Nominated	
Blockbuster Entertainment Awards	2000	Favorite Supporting Actress – Horror	Sleepy Hollow	Won	
Chicago Film Critics Association Awards	1993	Best Supporting Actress	The Crying Game	Nominated	
Chicago Film Critics Association Awards	2004	Best Supporting Actress	Spider	Nominated	
Chlotrudis Awards	2004	Best Supporting Actress	Spider	Nominated	
Critics' Choice Awards	2003	Best Acting Ensemble	The Hours	Nominated	
David di Donatello Awards	1986	Best Foreign Actress	Dance with a Stranger	Nominated	
Evening Standard British Film Awards	1986	Best Actress	Dance with a Stranger	Won	
Film Critics Circle of Australia Awards	2003	Best Supporting Actress	The Rage in Placid Lake	Nominated	
Film Independent Spirit Awards	1998	Best Supporting Female	The Apostle	Nominated	
Golden Globes	1993	Best Actress in a Motion Picture – Musical or Comedy	Enchanted April	Won	
Golden Globes	1993	Best Supporting Actress – Motion Picture	Damage	Nominated	
Golden Globes	1995	Best Actress in a Motion Picture – Drama	Tom & Viv	Nominated	
Golden Globes	1995	Best Supporting Actress – Television	Fatherland	Won	
Golden Globes	1999	Best Actress – Miniseries or Television Film	Merlin	Nominated	
Golden Globes	2000	Best Supporting Actress – Television	The Big Brass Ring	Nominated	
Golden Globes	2005	Best Actress – Miniseries or Television Film	The Lost Prince	Nominated	
Laurence Olivier Awards	1987	Best Actress	A Lie of the Mind	Nominated	
London Film Critics' Circle Awards	1994	British Actress of the Year	Damage	Won	
London Film Critics' Circle Awards	2000	British Actress of the Year	The King and I	Nominated	
London Film Critics' Circle Awards	2003	British Actress of the Year	Spider	Nominated	
London Film Critics' Circle Awards	2015	Dilys Powell Award for Excellence in Film	—N/a	Won	
Los Angeles Film Critics Association Awards	1992	Best Supporting Actress	The Crying Game; Damage; Enchanted April	Runner-up	
National Board of Review Awards	1994	Best Actress	Tom & Viv	Won	
National Society of Film Critics Awards	1993	Best Supporting Actress	The Crying Game; Damage; Enchanted April	Runner-up	
New York Film Critics Circle Awards	1993	Best Supporting Actress	The Crying Game; Damage; Enchanted April	Won	
Primetime Emmy Awards	2015	Outstanding Narrator	Operation Orangutan	Nominated	
RTS Programme Awards	1988	Best Performance – Female	Screen Two: "Sweet as You Are"	Won	
RTS Programme Awards	1998	Best Actor – Female	A Dance to the Music of Time	Nominated	
San Francisco Film Critics Circle Awards	2002	Best Supporting Actress	Spider	Won	
Sant Jordi Awards	2003	Best Foreign Actress	Spider	Won	
Satellite Awards	1997	Best Supporting Actress in a Motion Picture – Drama	The Evening Star	Nominated	
Satellite Awards	2003	Best Supporting Actress in a Motion Picture – Drama	Spider	Nominated	
Satellite Awards	2005	Best Actress – Miniseries or Television Film	The Lost Prince	Nominated	
Satellite Awards	2006	Best Actress – Miniseries or Television Film	Gideon's Daughter	Nominated	
Saturn Awards	2000	Best Supporting Actress	Sleepy Hollow	Nominated	
Society of Texas Film Critics Awards	1996	Best Supporting Actress	The Evening Star; Kansas City	Won	
Toronto Film Critics Association Awards	2003	Best Supporting Actress	Spider	Won	
Vancouver Film Critics Circle Awards	2010	Best Supporting Actress in a Canadian Film	The Young Victoria	Nominated	
