= Rosemary Harris =

English actress (born 1927)

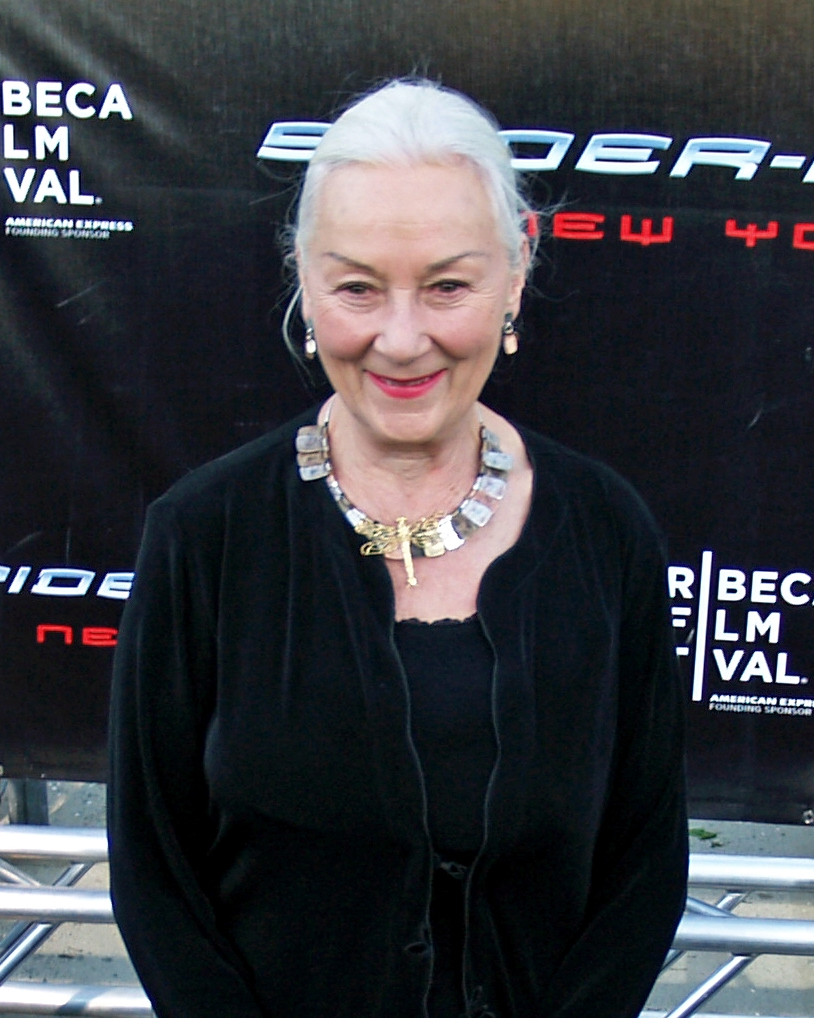
- Rosemary Harris in 2007
- Born: Rosemary Ann Harris; 19 September 1927 (age 99); Ashby-de-la-Zouch, Leicestershire, England
- Years active: 1948–present
- Spouses: Ellis Rabb (m. 1959; div. 1967) John Ehle (m. 1967; died 2018)
- Children: Jennifer Ehle

Rosemary Ann Harris (born 19 September 1927) is an English actress. She is the recipient of an Emmy Award, a Golden Globe Award, and a Tony Award as well as nominations for an Academy Award, a BAFTA Award, and three Laurence Olivier Awards. Harris was inducted into the American Theater Hall of Fame in 1986, and she won the Tony Award for Lifetime Achievement in the Theatre in 2017.

Harris began her stage career in 1948, before making her Broadway debut in 1952. For her New York stage work, she is a four-time Drama Desk Award winner and nine-time Tony Award nominee, winning the Tony Award for Best Actress in a Play in for portraying Eleanor of Aquitaine in The Lion in Winter (1966). Her other Tony-nominated roles were in Old Times (1972), The Royal Family (1976), Heartbreak House (1984), Pack of Lies (1985), Hay Fever (1986), A Delicate Balance (1996), Waiting in the Wings (2000), and The Royal Family (2010).

She won the Primetime Emmy Award for Outstanding Lead Actress in a Limited Series or Movie for her portrayal of George Sand in the BBC serial Notorious Woman (1976), and the Golden Globe Award for Best Actress – Television Series Drama for playing Berta Palitz Weiss in the miniseries Holocaust (1978). For her performance in the historical drama film Tom & Viv (1994) she was nominated for the Academy Award for Best Supporting Actress. Harris is also best known for her portrayal of May Parker, the paternal aunt of Peter Parker, in Sam Raimi's Spider-Man trilogy (2002–2007).

== Early life ==
Harris was born on 19 September 1927 in Ashby De La Zouch, Leicestershire, the daughter of Enid Maude Frances (née Campion) and Stafford Berkeley Harris. One of her grandmothers was from Kronstadt in the Habsburg Empire (today Romania). Her father was in the Royal Air Force, and as a result, Harris' family lived in India during her early childhood. She attended convent schools, and later studied at the Royal Academy of Dramatic Art from 1951 to 1952.

== Career ==
=== 1948–1965: Rise to prominence ===
Early in her acting career, she gained experience in English repertory theatre. In 1948, she acted in Kiss and Tell at Eastbourne and Margate with Tilsa Page and John Clark and later with Anthony Cundell's company at Penzance, where she played the mother in Black Chiffon. She went from Penzance to train at RADA. She first appeared in New York City in 1951 in Moss Hart's Climate of Eden, and then returned to Britain for her West End debut in The Seven Year Itch which ran for a year at the Aldwych.

Harris then entered a classical acting period in productions with the Bristol Old Vic and then the Old Vic, appearing at the latter as Ophelia in the National Theatre Company's opening production of Hamlet in October 1963, alongside Peter O'Toole in the title role. Writing in UK newspaper The Guardian in 2003 as part of a series on landmark theatre productions, playwright Samantha Ellis noted of the National Theatre's opening night:

Olivier gloomily anticipated bad reviews. But RB Marriott, in The Stage, found O'Toole to be "a magnificent Prince" and Rosemary Harris "the most real and touching Ophelia". (In contrast, Felix Barker, in the Evening News, called her "an embarrassing deb who has had too much gin".) And Harold Hobson, in The Sunday Times, was overcome.

Her first film followed, Beau Brummell (1954) with Stewart Granger and Elizabeth Taylor, and then a touring season with the Old Vic brought her back to Broadway in Tyrone Guthrie's production of Troilus and Cressida. She met Ellis Rabb who had plans to start his own producing company on Broadway. The following year she portrayed Desdemona in a television production of William Shakespeare's Othello directed by Tony Richardson Harris acted opposite Paul Rogers, Robert Hardy, and Nigel Davenport. In 1957 she appeared in two episodes of Alfred Hitchcock Presents.

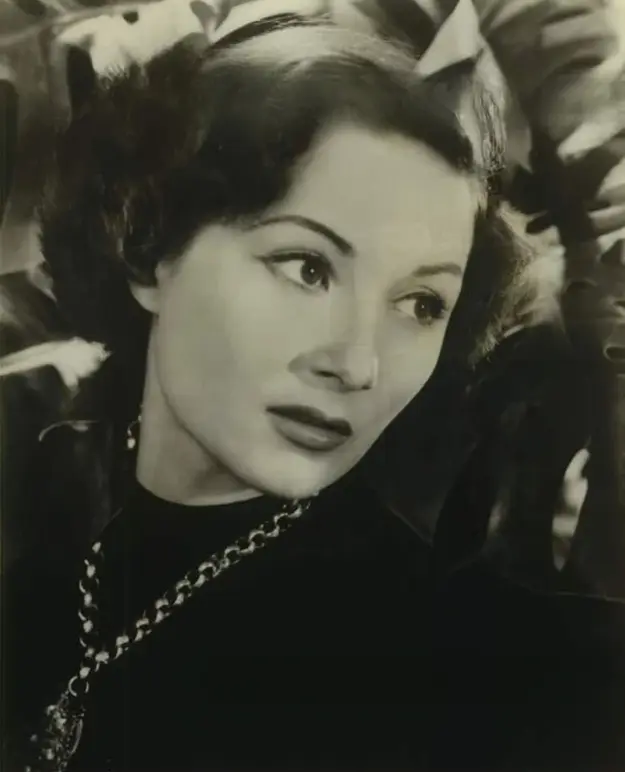
Harris in 1958

In 1958 she acted alongside John Williams, and Maurice Evans in the NBC production of Dial M for Murder. That same year she portrayed Catherine Linton acting alongside Richard Burton who portrayed Heathcliff in the CBS television production of Emily Brontë's 1847 novel Wuthering Heights. By 1959, the Association of Producing Artist (APA) was established, and she and Rabb were married on 4 December of that year.

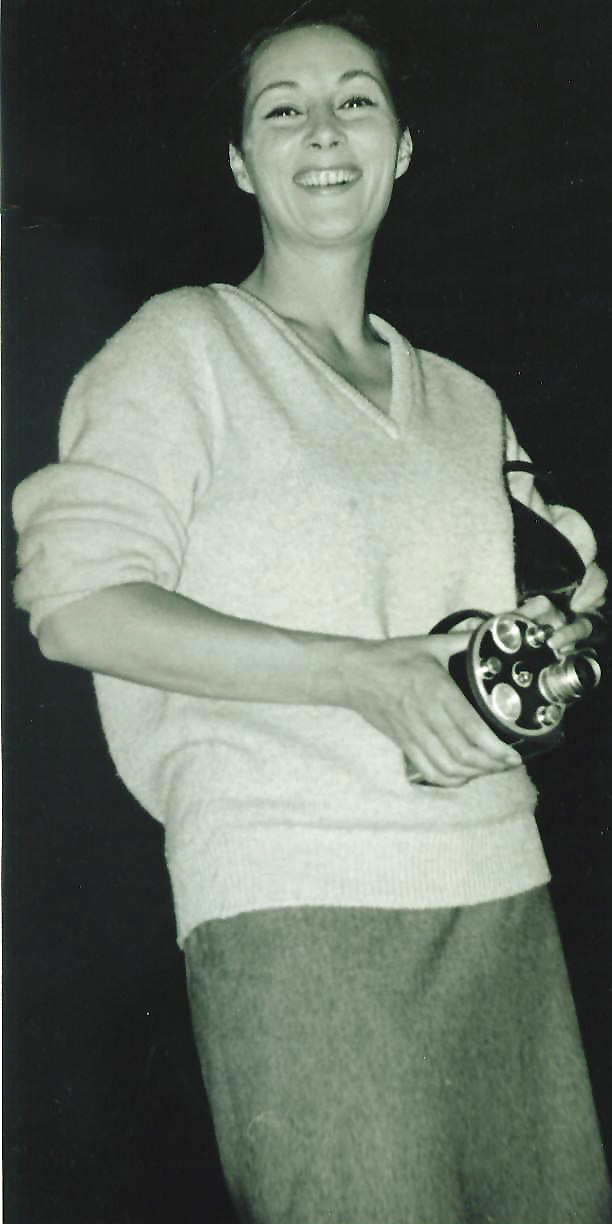
Harris at the Chichester Festival Theatre, 1962

In 1962, she returned to Britain and Chichester Festival Theatre during its opening season when the director was Laurence Olivier; she appeared as Elena in Olivier's celebrated 1962–63 Chichester production of Uncle Vanya. She reprised her role in the 1963 British film adaptation acting opposite Olivier, Michael Redgrave, and Joan Plowright. In 1964, she was Ophelia to Peter O'Toole's Hamlet in the inaugural production of the Royal National Theatre of Great Britain. She returned to Broadway portraying Megara in Herakles at the Lyceum Theatre. That same year she portrayed Alice Sycamore in You Can't Take It with You. She also appeared in an off-Broadway production of George Bernard Shaw's Man and Superman at the Phoenix Theatre.

=== 1966–1999: Theatre roles and acclaim ===
Harris gained acclaim working further with the APA, and was cast as Eleanor of Aquitaine in The Lion in Winter opposite Robert Preston's Henry II at the Ambassador Theatre. She received praise for the role as well as the Tony Award for Best Actress in a Play. Rabb directed her one last time as Natasha in War and Peace in 1967, the same year they agreed to divorce. A little while later, Harris married the American writer John Ehle. The two of them can be heard interviewing prospective candidates, Black public school student candidates for scholarships to all-white private "Segregation academies", on surviving recordings. Ehle was the manager for this Stouffer Foundation program.

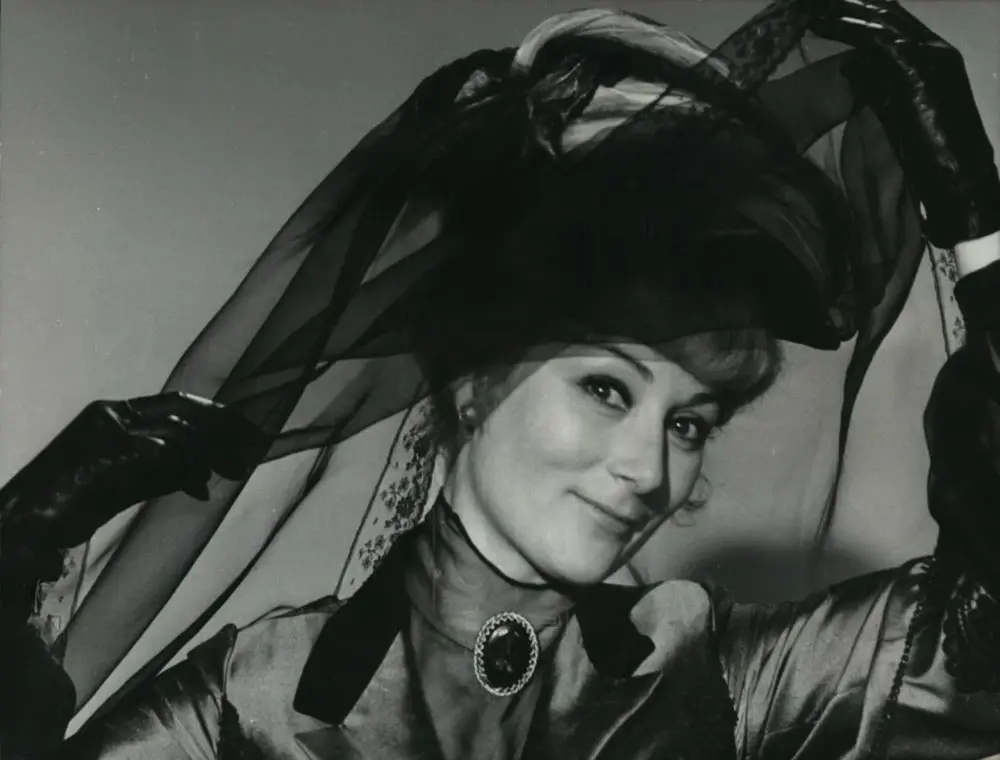
Harris in A Flea in Her Ear (1968)

In 1968, she portrayed Gabrielle Chandebisse in the film A Flea in Her Ear based on the 1907 French farce of the same name by Georges Feydeau. She acted with Rex Harrison and Louis Jourdan. She received Tony Award for Best Actress in a Play nominations for her roles as Anna in Harold Pinter's Old Times (1971) and Julie Cavendish in George S. Kaufman and Edna Ferber's The Royal Family (1975).

During this time she portrayed Blanche DuBois in the Tennessee Williams play A Streetcar Named Desire (1973) and Portia in William Shakespeare's The Merchant of Venice (1973). In 1974, Harris starred in the BBC TV serial Notorious Woman, which aired on PBS in the US as part of Masterpiece Theatre. For this role, she won the 1976 Primetime Emmy Award for Outstanding Lead Actress in a Limited Series. She won a Golden Globe Award for Best Actress – TV Drama for the 1978 NBC miniseries Holocaust, which also starred Meryl Streep and James Woods. Also in 1978 she acted in Franklin J. Schaffner's science-fiction thriller The Boys from Brazil acting with Gregory Peck, Laurence Olivier, James Mason, and Denholm Elliott. The film received critical acclaim and earned three Academy Award nominations.

From 1979 to 1980 she starred in the CBS Western miniseries The Chisholms opposite Robert Preston. Reviewing the BBC's 1983 production of To the Lighthouse, an adaptation of Virginia Woolf's novel of the same name, John J. O'Connor of The New York Times wrote: "A luminous, flawless performance by Miss Harris makes Mrs. Ramsay as memorable on film as she is on the printed page." She played Ann Barrington in the Richard Eyre directed The Ploughman's Lunch (1983) written by Ian McEwan. She acted with Jonathan Pryce and Tim Curry. The film looks at the media world in Margaret Thatcher's Britain around the time of the Falklands War. Vincent Canby of The New York Times declared, "[the] film's most arresting character is Ann, a beautiful woman whose intelligence is demonstrated both in the writing and in Miss Harris's superlative performance." She also took film roles in Crossing Delancey (1988) and The Delinquents (1989), and The Bridge (1992). She returned to Broadway acting in Neil Simon's Lost in Yonkers (1991).

For her role as Rose Haigh-Wood in the historical drama Tom & Viv, she won the National Board of Review Award for Best Supporting Actress and received a nomination for the Academy Award for Best Supporting Actress. Harris acted with Willem Dafoe and Miranda Richardson. The film was based on the 1984 play of the same name by Michael Hastings. She returned to Broadway in a revival of Edward Albee's A Delicate Balance (1996) for which she received a nomination for the Tony Award for Best Actress in a Play. That same year she had a brief role as Player Queen in Kenneth Branagh's film adaptation of Hamlet (1996). Harris and her daughter Jennifer Ehle, played the young and elderly incarnations, respectively, of the same character in István Szabó's 1999 film Sunshine, about a Hungarian-Jewish family. They previously played the young and old Calypso in the Channel 4 production of The Camomile Lawn (1992). In 1999 she starred in the Hugh Hudson directed film My Life So Far based on the Denis Forman book of the same name. Harris acted with Colin Firth, Irène Jacob, Malcolm McDowell, and Kelly Macdonald.

=== 2000–present ===
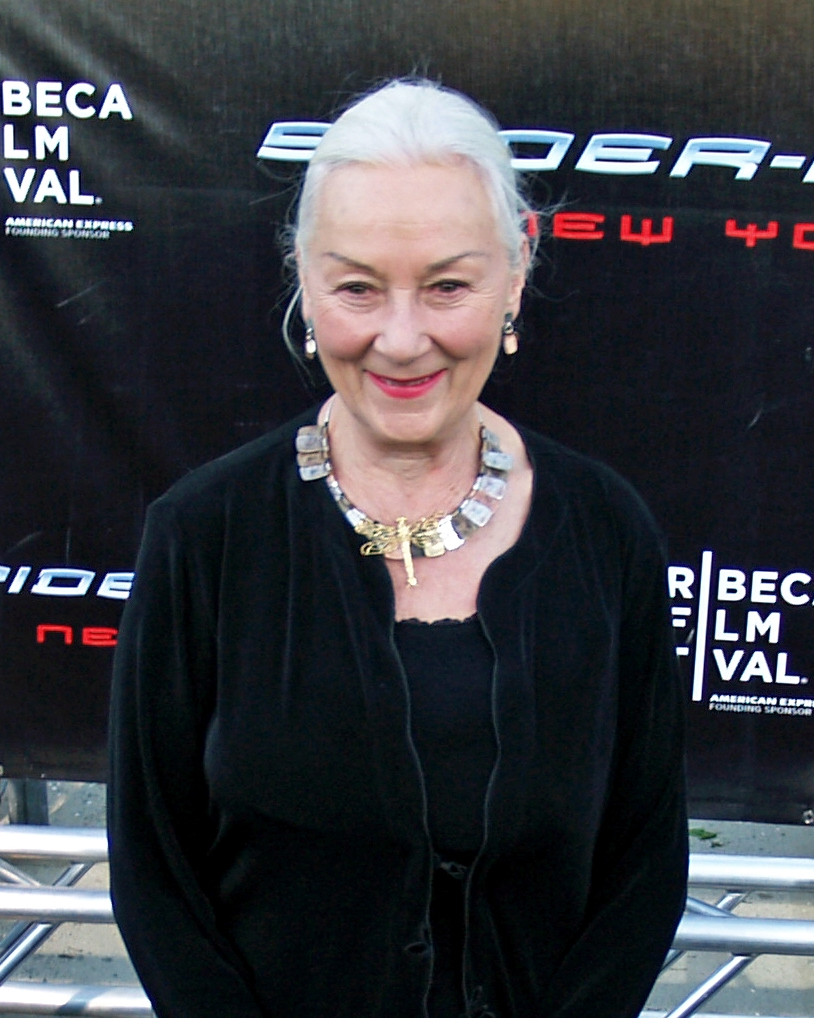
Harris in 2007 at the Tribeca Film Festival in promotion of Spider-Man 3

Harris had a recurring role as Aunt May Parker in the 2002 Spider-Man film adaptation, and reprised the role in the sequels Spider-Man 2 (2004) and Spider-Man 3 (2007). These films were critically acclaimed and were commercially successful. Directed by Sam Raimi, the films also starred Tobey Maguire, Kirsten Dunst, J. K. Simmons, Willem Dafoe and Alfred Molina. Her film roles during this period included the supernatural horror film The Gift (2000) starring Cate Blanchett, the romantic comedy Blow Dry (2001) with Alan Rickman and Natasha Richardson, and the comedy-drama Being Julia starring Annette Bening. Harris appeared in the rotating cast of the Off-Broadway staged reading of Wit & Wisdom. In 2007, she received the North Carolina Award for fine arts. Her husband, John Ehle, won the same award in 1972 for literature. Also in 2007 she acted in Sidney Lumet's crime thriller Before the Devil Knows You're Dead for which she received the Gotham Independent Film Award for Best Ensemble Cast along with the cast.

Harris took limited film roles in the drama Is Anybody There? with Michael Caine, the romantic comedy This Means War starring Reese Witherspoon, Chris Pine, and Tom Hardy, and the musical drama The von Trapp Family: A Life of Music (2015) with Matthew Macfadyen. She had a guest starring role in Law & Order: Special Victims Unit (2010). On 11 September 2018, a week before her 91st birthday, Harris took over the role of Mrs. Higgins in the Broadway revival of My Fair Lady from Diana Rigg. She recently acted in the HBO limited series The Undoing (2020) as a guest actress and had a recurring role in the HBO Max comedy series Search Party (2022).

In 2024, Harris had a supporting role as Lady Bracknell in the comedy film Oscar Wilde About America.

== Personal life ==
From 1959 to 1967, she was married to actor and director Ellis Rabb. In 1967, she married writer John Ehle and they settled in Winston-Salem, North Carolina, where their daughter, Jennifer Ehle, was born in 1969. Jennifer followed in her mother's footsteps by becoming a noted film, television and Broadway actress. Harris' archive is part of the performing arts collections at the Harry Ransom Center, which includes her scripts, photographs, posters, correspondence, playbills, and other ephemera. She is an Episcopalian and is a part of the advisory board of the Episcopal Actors' Guild.

== Acting credits ==
=== Film ===
Year	Title	Role	Notes
1954	Beau Brummell	Mrs. Fitzherbert	Film debut
1957	The Shiralee	Lily Parker	
1963	Uncle Vanya	Yelena	
1968	A Flea in Her Ear	Gabrielle Chandebisse	
1978	The Boys from Brazil	Mrs. Doring	
1983	The Ploughman's Lunch	Ann Barrington	
1988	Crossing Delancey	Pauline Swift	
1989	The Delinquents	Isobel	
1992	The Bridge	Aunt Jude	
1994	Tom & Viv	Rose Haigh-Wood	
1996	Hamlet	Player Queen	
1999	My Life So Far	Gamma	
1999	Sunshine	Valerie Sors	
2000	The Gift	Annie's Granny	
2001	Blow Dry	Daisy	
2002	Spider-Man	May Parker	
2004	Spider-Man 2	May Parker	
2004	Being Julia	Julia's mother	
2007	Spider-Man 3	May Parker	
2007	Before the Devil Knows You're Dead	Nanette	
2008	Is Anybody There?	Elsie	
2008	The Monday Before Thanksgiving	Lillian Cotlo	Short film
2010	Radio Free Albemuth	VALIS	Voice role
2012	This Means War	Nana Foster	
2015	The von Trapp Family: A Life of Music	Older Agathe von Trapp	
2024	Oscar Wilde About America	Lady Bracknell	

=== Television ===
Year	Title	Role	Notes
1952	A Cradle of Wlllow	Tansy Clampett	Television debut; Television film
1952	Studio One in Hollywood	Herself	Episode: "The Great Lady"
1955	Othello	Desdemona	Television film
1957	Alfred Hitchcock Presents	Louise Rogers / Countess Helen Sorrington-Mattoni	Season 2 Episodes 26 and 27: "I Killed the Count Parts 2 & 3"
1957	Alfred Hitchcock Presents	Dorothy Whitely	Season 3 Episode 1: "The Glass Eye"
1957	Twelfth Night	Viola	Television film
1958	Suspicion	Sybil Merton	Episode: "Lord Arthur Savile's Crime"
1958	Omnibus	Cordelia	Episode: "Moment of Truth"
1958	Dial M for Murder	Margot Wendice	Television film
1958	Folio	Dynamene	Episode: "A Phoenix Too Frequent"
1958	DuPont Show of the Month	Cathy Linton	Episode: Wuthering Heights
1959	Encounter	Norah Marsh	Episode: "The Land of Promise"
1964	Profiles in Courage	Mary S. McDowell	Episode: "Mary S. McDowell"
1966	Blithe Spirit	Elvira Condomine	Television film
1967	Uncle Vanya	Jelena Andrejewna	Television film
1974	Notorious Woman	George Sand	Television miniseries; 7 episodes
1977	The Royal Family	Julie Cavendish	Television film
1978	Holocaust	Berta Palitz Weiss	Television miniseries; 4 episodes
1979–1980	The Chisholms	Minerva Chisholm	Television miniseries; 13 episodes
1983	To the Lighthouse	Mrs. Ramsay	Television film
1992	The Camomile Lawn	Calypso (older)	Television miniseries; 2 episodes
1994	Under the Hammer	Hester Bovington	Episode: "The Spectre at the Feast"
1994	Summer Day's Dream	Margaret Dawlish	One-off production in the BBC's Performance series
1996	The Little Riders	Grandma Roden	Television film
1996	Death of a Salesman	Linda	Television film
2004	Belonging	May	Television film
2010	Law & Order: Special Victims Unit	Francine Brooks	Episode: "Wet"
2014	The Money	Ellen Knox	Television film
2020	The Undoing	Janet Fraser	Episode: "Trial by Fury"
2022	Search Party	Beatrice	2 episodes

=== Theatre ===
Year	Title	Role	Venue
1952	The Climate of Eden	Mabel	Martin Beck Theatre, Broadway
1953–54	The Seven Year Itch	The Girl	Aldwych Theatre, London
1954	The Crucible	Elizabeth Proctor	Bristol Old Vic, London
1956	Troilus and Cressida	Cressida	Winter Garden Theatre, Broadway
1957	The Glass Eye	Dorothy Witley	ANTA Playhouse, New York
1958	Interlock	Hilde	ANTA Playhouse, New York
1958	The Disenchanted	Jere Halliday	Coronet Theatre, Broadway
1960	The Tumbler	Lennie	Helen Hayes Theatre, Broadway
1963	Uncle Vanya	Ilyena	Chichester Festival Theatre, London
1963	Hamlet	Ophelia	Old Vic Theatre, London
1965	Judith	Judith	Phoenix Theatre, Off-Broadway
1965	Man and Superman	Violet Robinson	Phoenix Theatre, Off-Broadway
1965	War and Peace	Natasha Rostova	Phoenix Theatre, Off-Broadway
1965	Herakles	Megara	Lyceum Theatre, Broadway
1966	The Lion in Winter	Eleanor	Ambassador Theatre, Broadway
1966–67	The School for Scandal	Lady Teazle	Lyceum Theatre, Broadway
1966	Right You Are If You Think You Are	Signora Ponza	Lyceum Theatre, Broadway
1966	We, Comrades Three	Young Woman	Lyceum Theatre, Broadway
1967	The Wild Duck	Gina	Lyceum Theatre, Broadway
1967	You Can't Take it With You	Alice Sycamore	Lyceum Theatre, Broadway
1967	War and Peace	Natasha Rostova	Lyceum Theatre, Broadway
1971–72	Old Times	Anna	Billy Rose Theatre, Broadway
1973	The Merchant of Venice	Portia	Vivian Beaumont Theatre, Broadway
1973	A Streetcar Named Desire	Blanche DuBois	Vivian Beaumont Theatre, Broadway
1975–76	The Royal Family	Julie Cavendish	Brooklyn Academy of Music; Helen Hayes Theatre, Broadway
1977	The New York Idea	Vida Phillimore	Brooklyn Academy of Music
1977	The Three Sisters	Olga	Brooklyn Academy of Music
1983	Heartbreak House	Hesione Hushabye	Circle in the Square Theatre, Off-Broadway
1983	Heartbreak House	Hesione Hushabye	Theatre Royal Haymarket, London
1985	Pack of Lies	Barbara Jackson	Royale Theatre, Broadway
1985–86	Hay Fever	Judith Bliss	Music Box Theatre, Broadway
1991–93	Lost in Yonkers	Grandma Kurnitz	Richard Rodgers Theatre, Broadway; Strand Theatre, London
1994–95	An Inspector Calls	Sybil Birling	Royale Theatre, Broadway
1996	A Delicate Balance	Agnes	Plymouth Theatre, Broadway
1999	Waiting in the Wings	May Davenport	Walter Kerr Theatre, Broadway; Eugene O'Neill Theatre, Broadway
2002	All Over	The Wife	Gramercy Theatre, New York City
2005	The Other Side	Levana Julak	Manhattan Theatre Club, Off-Broadway
2007	Oscar and the Lady in Pink	Performer	Old Globe Theatre, San Diego
2008	Oscar and the Lady in Pink	Performer	Florence Gould Hall, New York City
2009	The Royal Family	Fanny Cavendish	Samuel J. Friedman Theatre, Broadway
2012	The Road to Mecca	Miss Helen	American Airlines Theatre, Broadway
2014	Indian Ink	Eleanor Swan	Laura Pels Theatre, Off-Broadway
2018−19	My Fair Lady	Mrs. Higgins	Vivian Beaumont Theatre, Broadway

=== Video games ===
Year	Title	Role	Notes
1998	Dark Side of the Moon	Miner Woman (voice role)	PC version for Windows 95/98

== Awards and nominations ==
Film and television

Year	Association	Category	Title	Results	Ref.
1976	Primetime Emmy Award	Outstanding Lead Actress in a Limited Series	Notorious Woman	Won	
1976	Golden Globe Award	Best Actress in a Television Series – Drama	Notorious Woman	Nominated	
1978	Primetime Emmy Award	Outstanding Lead Actress in a Limited Series	Holocaust	Nominated	
1978	Golden Globe Award	Best actress in a Television Series - Drama	Holocaust	Won	
1984	BAFTA Award	Best Actress in a Supporting Role	The Ploughman's Lunch	Nominated	
1994	Academy Award	Best Actress in a Supporting Role	Tom & Viv	Nominated	
1994	National Board of Review	Best Supporting Actress	Tom & Viv	Won	
2007	Critics' Choice Movie Award	Best Acting Ensemble	Before the Devil Knows You're Dead	Nominated	
2007	Gotham Award	Best Ensemble Cast	Before the Devil Knows You're Dead	Won	

Theatre accolades

Year	Association	Category	Title	Results	Ref.
1966	Tony Awards	Best Actress in a Play	The Lion in Winter	Won	
1972	Tony Awards	Best Actress in a Play	Old Times	Nominated	
1976	Tony Awards	Best Actress in a Play	The Royal Family	Nominated	
1984	Tony Awards	Best Actress in a Play	Heartbreak House	Nominated	
1985	Tony Awards	Best Actress in a Play	Pack of Lies	Nominated	
1986	Tony Awards	Best Actress in a Play	Hay Fever	Nominated	
1996	Tony Awards	Best Actress in a Play	A Delicate Balance	Nominated	
2000	Tony Awards	Best Actress in a Play	Waiting in the Wings	Nominated	
2010	Tony Awards	Best Featured Actress in a Play	The Royal Family	Nominated	
2019	Tony Awards	Lifetime Achievement Award	—N/a	Honored	
1972	Drama Desk Award	Best Performance	Old Times	Won	
1973	Drama Desk Award	Best Performance	A Streetcar Named Desire	Won	
1973	Drama Desk Award	Best Performance	The Merchant of Venice	Won	
1976	Drama Desk Award	Actress in a Play	The Royal Family	Won	
1984	Drama Desk Award	Actress in a Play	Heartbreak House	Nominated	
1985	Drama Desk Award	Actress in a Play	Pack of Lies	Won	
1996	Drama Desk Award	Actress in a Play	A Delicate Balance	Nominated	
1967	Drama League Award	Distinguished Performance	The Wild Duck	Won	
1981	Laurence Olivier Award	Actress in a Revival	All My Sons	Nominated	
1983	Laurence Olivier Award	Actress in a Revival	Heartbreak House	Nominated	
1993	Laurence Olivier Award	Supporting Actress	Lost in Yonkers	Nominated	
1962	Obie Award	Distinguished Performance by an Actress	The Tavern, The School for Scandal, The Seagull	Won	
1965	Obie Award	Distinguished Performance by an Actress	Judith, Man and Superman, War and Peace	Won	
2003	Obie Award	Distinguished Performance by an Actress	All Over	Nominated	
