= Peter Evans (actor) =

American actor (1950-1989)

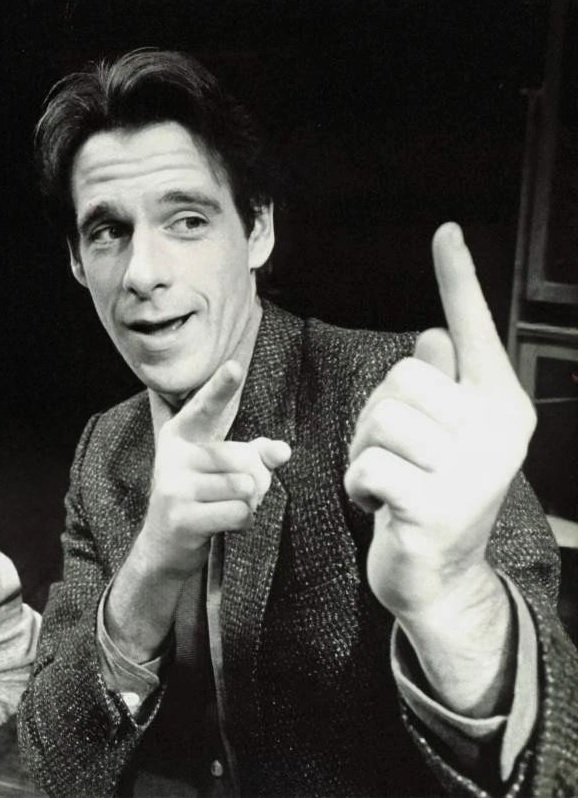
- Evans in Children of a Lesser God (1981)
- Born: May 27, 1950; Englewood, New Jersey, U.S.
- Died: May 20, 1989 (aged 38); Los Angeles, California, U.S.
- Occupation: Actor
- Years active: 1975–1988

Peter Evans (May 27, 1950 – May 20, 1989) was an American actor. He won the 1976 Clarence Derwent Award and was nominated for a Drama Desk Award for his portrayal of Richie in David Rabe's Streamers. However, he was best known for his role as Russ Merman in the 1980s sitcom 9 to 5.

== Early life and education ==
Evans was born in 1950 in Englewood, New Jersey, to Dudley and Caroline Evans. He had a brother, John Randall, and a sister, Elizabeth Temple. He attended Phillips Academy, Andover. In 1972, he graduated from Yale University. For three years, Evans attended the Central School of Speech and Drama.

== Career ==
=== Theatre ===
In 1975, Evans made his debut in the New York theater with David Storey's Life Class. In 1976, Mike Nichols directed him in David Rabe's Streamers, in which he portrayed Richie. His performance as Richie won him the Clarence Derwent Award and garnered him a Drama Desk Award nomination. In 1977, he appeared opposite Ellis Rabb in David Mamet's A Life in the Theatre. In 1979, he appeared opposite Maggie Smith in Tom Stoppard's Night and Day. In 1982, Evans played James Leeds in a Broadway production of Mark Medoff's Children of a Lesser God.

=== Television ===
In 1977, he appeared in the PBS miniseries Best of Families. In 1979, Evans reprised his role in a television film adaptation of A Life in the Theatre. He also portrayed Russ Merman in the 1980s sitcom 9 to 5. He was in an episode of St. Elsewhere in 1984.

=== Film ===
Evans appeared in the films Impostors (1979) and Arthur (1981).

Year	Title	Role	Notes
1979	Impostors	Peter	
1981	Arthur	Preston	

== Personal life and death ==
Evans resided in Los Angeles for the last several years of his life. He died on May 20, 1989, from complications of AIDS at the age of 38 in Century City Hospital in Los Angeles.
