= Tom & Viv (play) =

1984 play by Michael Hastings

- Flyer for original production
- Original language: English
- Written by: Michael Hastings
- Subject: Period/Biographical
- Setting: England

Premiere
- Date: 1984
- Place: Royal Court Theatre
- Official website

Tom & Viv is a play written by English playwright Michael Hastings. The play is based on the real lives of T. S. Eliot and his wife Vivienne Haigh-Wood Eliot.

To write the play, Hastings spent many months conducting interviews with friends and family of the Eliots who were still alive and reading through the letters left behind by the family. The play generated controversy for depicting T.S. Eliot in a less than flattering light regarding his treatment of his wife during her poor health.

== Synopsis ==
The play starts with the courtship between Eliot and Vivienne Haigh-Wood in 1914 and ends with their separation in 1933, followed by Vivienne's gradual mental health decline until her death in 1947. The play also follows the early career of T.S. Eliot, the death of Vivienne's father, and how her mother Rose dealt with her daughter's failing marriage and mental health.

== Historical casting ==
| Character | 1984 Royal Court Theatre cast | 1985 The Public Theater cast | 1994 film cast | 2006 Almeida Theatre cast |
|---|---|---|---|---|
| Vivienne Haigh-Wood | Julie Covington | Julie Covington | Miranda Richardson | Frances O'Connor |
| T.S. Eliot | Tom Wilkinson | Edward Herrmann | Willem Dafoe | Will Keen |
| Rose Haigh-Wood | Margaret Tyzack | Margaret Tyzack | Rosemary Harris | Anna Carteret |
| Maurice Haigh-Wood | David Haig | David Haig | Tim Dutton | Robert Portal |

== Performance history ==
The play premiered in 1984 at the Royal Court Theatre. The same cast, except for Wilkinson who was replaced by Edward Herrmann, traveled to New York and the play was staged at The Public Theater. The play did not transfer to Broadway, and instead returned to London for a short run.

In 2006, the first major revival was staged at the Almeida Theatre in London starring Frances O'Connor, Will Keen, and Anna Carteret.

In 2010, a production was staged at Wadham College in Oxford.

== Adaptations and awards ==
The play was adapted as a film by Hastings and Adrian Hodges with of the same name in 1993 and released in 1994 by the Weinstein Company. The film received acclaim and Miranda Richardson was nominated for the Academy Award for Best Actress and Rosemary Harris was nominated for the Academy Award for Best Supporting Actress.

For the Royal Court Theatre run, Julie Covington was nominated for the Laurence Olivier Award for Actress of the Year in a New Play.

For the original off-Broadway run, Margaret Tyzack was nominated for the Drama Desk Award for Outstanding Featured Actress in a Play.

The play script was first published in 1985 by Penguin Books, it was revised in 1992 with additional notes, and in 2000 it was revised and released by Oberon Books.

BBC adapted the play as an audiobook starring Benedict Cumberbatch as T.S. Eliot, Lia Williams as Vivienne, David Haig as Maurice and Judy Parfitt as Rose.
