= Carole Seymour-Jones =

Welsh writer

- Born: March 3, 1943; Towyn, Wales
- Died: May 23, 2015 (aged 72)
- Occupation: Writer

Carole Veronica Gillian Seymour-Jones (3 March 1943 – 23 May 2015) was a Welsh writer. She taught history at Surrey University. She wrote biographies of Beatrice Webb and Vivienne Haigh-Wood Eliot.

== Biography ==
Seymour-Jones was born in Towyn, north-west Wales, the daughter of a prominent surgeon. She was raised in Southsea. She studied history at Lady Margaret Hall, Oxford, but left after her first year, under family pressure, to marry the stockbroker Robert Bigland. She completed her history degree with the Open University, while raising four children, and later gained her master's degree at Sussex University. She taught history to adults at Surrey University and to sixth formers.

Although she had been writing educational books for some years, Seymour-Jones' career as a biographer began after the breakup of her first marriage after 26 years in the early 1990s. She was the author of Beatrice Webb: A Life (1992); Painted Shadow: The Life of Vivienne Eliot, First Wife of T.S. Eliot (2001), which she wrote as a visiting fellow at the University of Texas at Austin; and A Dangerous Liaison (2009), about the relationship between Simone de Beauvoir and Jean-Paul Sartre. She also wrote a biography of SOE agent Pearl Witherington, She Landed By Moonlight: The Story of Secret Agent Pearl Witherington: the 'real Charlotte Gray' (2013). She wrote for the New Statesman and the Times Higher Education Supplement, and was co-editor of Writers Under Siege: Voices of Freedom from Around the World (2007). She served on the executive committee of the English PEN, the writers' association, from 1997 to 2001, sat on its Books to Prisoners Committee, and chaired its Writers in Prison Committee.

== Marriage ==
Seymour-Jones met the probation officer and radio playwright Geoffrey Parkinson in 1992; the couple married in 2012. Parkinson died in 2014; Seymour-Jones died on 23 May 2015.
