= The Arctic Playhouse =

Theater in West Warwick, Rhode Island

Coordinates: 41°42′13″N 71°31′35″W

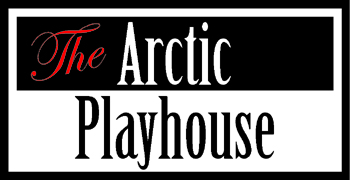
- The Arctic Playhouse logo
- Interactive map of The Arctic Playhouse
- Address: 1249 Main Street; West Warwick, Rhode Island; United States
- Capacity: 98
- Type: Community theater

Construction
- Opened: 2014
- Years active: 10

Website
- www.thearcticplayhouse.com

The Arctic Playhouse is a non-profit theater in West Warwick, Rhode Island located at 1249 Main Street in the village of Arctic, Rhode Island.

== History ==
The Arctic Playhouse evolved the ‘Daydream Theater Company’ that was founded in Providence, Rhode Island in 2002. In 2014, Daydream Theater Company was looking for a new, larger location. A venue was secured in Arctic Village, West Warwick. This location, seating 90 patrons, became home to The Arctic Playhouse, (TAP) a 501(c)(3) nonprofit organization. The theater contributes to the revival of this formerly vibrant mill village and is theater as is should be.

After demand for more space, TAP acquired the former Maxine's Department Store, (1249 Main Street) which will be the new home of The Arctic Playhouse, following a $1.5-million renovation that will give the theater company room to grow. “At the current location, the playhouse has 90 seats. At 1249 Main Street, it will have over 200 seats”, said board member Lloyd Felix.

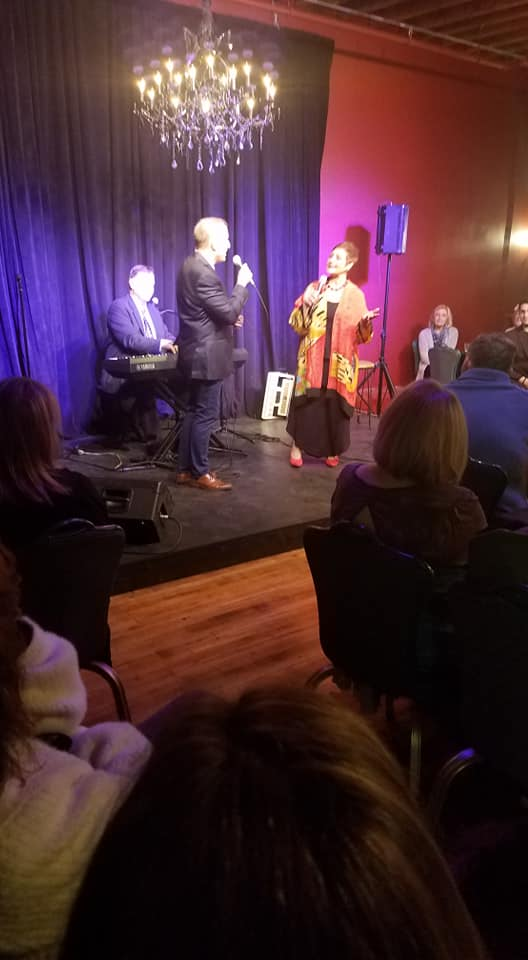
Executive Producer Jim Belanger welcomes Cabaret Host Ida Zecco

The new facility plan is divided into a main theater with balcony seating and a cabaret stage for smaller, more intimate, audiences. Long time supporter Ida Zecco hosted the first Cabaret Club on April 30, 2019 with Jim Rice on piano and guest artist John Abernathy. Another regular supporting artist, Lon Cerel, followed on May 3 with his Thief of Thoughts performance.

During the COVID-19 Pandemic, performances were streamed live to keep the Arts alive, actors and patrons involved and continued funding for renovations.

September 23, 2021 marked TAP's first "in person" performance at 1249 Main Street - "Murder at the Howard Johnson's" directed by Tony Annicone, with patrons assembled in a modified area of 1249 which presently seats 96 people.

== Future ==
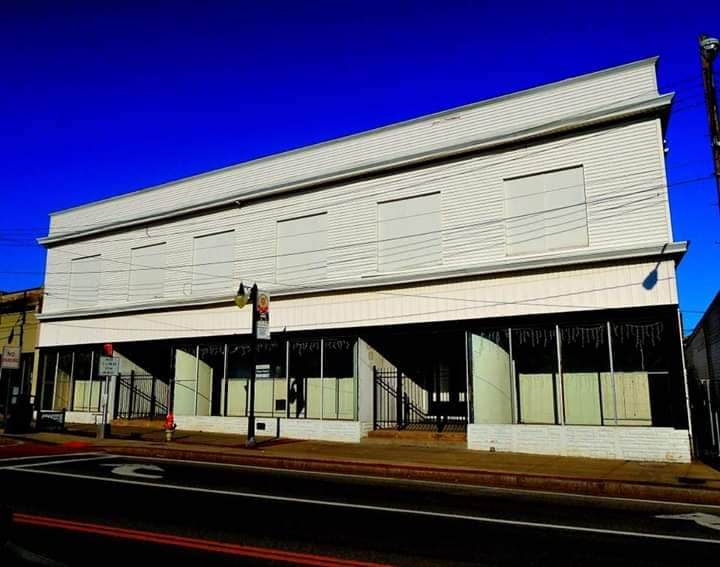
New Home of The Arctic Playhouse

Renovations continue for completing the theater with fundraising a vital part of this so equipment and materials can be purchased avoiding the need to finance into the future.

== Seasons ==
2024 Season • Legally Blonde The Musical • The Brothers Grimm • And Then There Were None – Agatha Christie • Crimes of the Heart • One Slight Hitch • Lone Star Love Potion • 45 Seconds from Broadway (A New Comedy) o A Tribute to Tony – Kelley Lennon o From My Heart, Aloha – Al Lorenzo o The Pickup Line – Jeanne Collins Crowley o The New Belters – Nicolas King and Seth Sikes o A Tribute to Billie and Amy – Frankie Campofelice and Andy Lantz o Becoming Okay with Being Gay – Krisanthi Pappas o French Women Don’t Shave and Other Truths Revealed – La Mechante et le Connard o The Jim and Val Show – Jim Rice and Valerie Sneade-Roy o Between Yesterday and Tomorrow – Marieann Maringolo o Autumn in my Soul – Michelle Currie o A Taste of Thanksgiving – David Rivera Bozon o A Song for the Season – Ida Zecco and Jim Rice

2022-23 Season

- 39 Steps
- Bedroom Farce
- Don't Dress For Dinner
- Lon Cerel
- Love Sex & The IRS
- Miracle on 34th Street
- The Addams Family (outside production)
- The Games A Foot or Holmes For The Holiday
- There's A Burglar In My Bed
  - Cabaret:
    - Love Notes - The High C's Ocean State Trio
    - P.S. I Love You - Kelley Lemon
    - Stories of Family Friends and Fun - Krisanthi Pappas
    - Art Isn't East - John Abernathy
    - Billy and Amy - Frankie Campofelice and Andy Lantz
    - Heart Attack! - Michael Hammond

2021-22 Season

- Exit Laughing
- Lie, Cheat and Genuflect
- Miracle on 34th Street
- Noises Off
- Second Nature Rides Again!
- Sex and the Older Girl
- Social Security
- The Hatmaker's Wife
- Lon Cerel
  - Cabaret:
    - Angela Bacari
    - David Bozon
    - Eden Casteel
    - Ida Zecco and Jim Rice
    - Ida Zecco
    - John O'Neil
    - Michelle Currie
    - Robb Bernard
    - Roderick Ferguson
    - The Next Generation
    - Valerie and Jim

2020-21 Season

- Miracle on 34th Street - The Radio Play
- Murder at the Howard Johnsons
- The Edgar Allan Poe Afterlife - Radio Show

- - - - -

2019-20 Season

- Vintage Hitchcock (Joe Landry) dir. Diane Lupo
- Bermuda Avenue Triangle (Renee Taylor and Joseph Bologna) dir. Tony Annicone
- Any Friend of Percy D'Angelino is A Friend of Mine (Jason Milligon) dir. Fred Davidson
- The Gift of the Magi / Balls / The First Noel (O. Henry / George Cameron Grant) dir. Rachel Hanauer
- Seussical the Musical
- Who's Calling?
- Visiting Mr. Green (Jeff Baron) dir. Sandy Cerel
- All My Sons (Arthur Miller) dir. Tony Annicone

2018-19 Season

- Steel Magnolias (Robert Harling) dir. Ida Zecco
- All I Really Need to Know I Learned in Kindergarten - The Musical (Robert Fulghum and Ernie Zulia) dir. Diane Lupo
- The Diary of Anne Frank (Frances Goodrich and Albert Hackett) dir. Rachel Hanauer
- Breaking Legs (Tom Dulack) dir. Hen Zannini and Fred Davison
- Who's Calling? (Rachel Hanauer) dir. Rachel Hanauer and Chelsea Swan
- A Life in the Theatre (David Mamet) dir. Tony Annicone
- A Christmas Carol the Musical (Charles Dickens) Original Score By Philip Martorella dir. John Martorella
- Last of the Red Hot Lovers (Neil Simon) dir. Tony Annicone
- Lost in Yonkers (Neil Simon) dir. Christian O'Brien

2017-18 Season

- Alice in Wonderland (Lewis Carroll) dir. Rachel Hanauer
- 13 Rue de l'Amour (Georges Feydeau) dir. Christian O'Brien
- MISGIVINGS: A “Divine” Comedy of Belly laughs, Blessings, Blarney & Bingo (Dave Kane) dir. Dave Kane
- TWO ONE ACT PLAYS! The Actor's Nightmare & Sister Mary Ignatius Explains It All For You (Christopher Durang) dir. Chris Plonka
- A Christmas Carol – A Live Radio Play (Charles Dickens), Adapted by Kevin Connors, Joe Landry dir. Christian O'Brien
- I LOVE… WHAT’S HIS NAME? Directed and performed by Rachel Hanauer and the Newport Arts Collaborative
- Tuesdays and Other Plays (William Donnelly) dir. William Donnelly
- On Golden Pond (Ernest Thompson) dir. Sandy Cerel
- The Odd Couple (Neil Simon) dir. John Faiola

2016-17 Season

- Butterflies Are Free (Leonard Gershe) dir. Tony Annicone
- The Dining Room (A. R. Gurney) dir. Sandy Cerel
- Barry Weintraub: LEGACY (Lenny Schwartz) dir. Lenny Schwartz
- Goodbye & Hurry Back (Lenny Schwartz) dir. Jennifer Rich
- Mrs. Mannerly (Jeffrey Hatcher) dir. Mary Beth Luzitano
- I Hate Hamlet (Paul Rudnick) dir. Christian O’Brien
- Carol’s Christmas (Shannon McCloud) dir. Dave McCloud
- Matt & Ben (Mindy Kaling and Brenda Withers)
- Ben Minus Zoe Minus Ben (Lenny Schwartz) dir. Lenny Schwartz
- Einstein & the Polar Bear (Tom Griffin) dir. Sandy Cerel

2015-16 Season

- The Social Avenger (Lenny Schwartz) dir. Lenny Schwartz
- Mac…Beth (Stephen Nani & Shannon McLoud) dir. Stephen Nani
- My Husband’s Wild Desires (John Tobias) dir. John Faiola
- Carol’s Christmas (Shannon McCloud) dir. Dave McCloud
- Late, A Cowboy Song (Sarah Ruhl) dir. Kelli Noonan
- Our Distance Between Stars (Lenny Schwartz) dir. Lenny Schwartz
- Human Nature (Christopher Ferreira) dir. Christopher Ferreira

2014–15 Season

- Crystal Romance (Lenny Schwartz) dir. Lenny Schwartz
- Co-Creator (Lenny Schwartz) dir. Lenny Schwartz
- The Man who Saw Snoopy (Lenny Schwartz) dir. Lenny Schwartz
