= Full Frontal (play) =

- Written by: Michael Hastings
- Characters: Gabriel Nkoke
- Original language: English

Premiere
- Date premiered: 13 February 1979
- Place premiered: Royal Court Theatre Upstairs, London

Full Frontal is a one-man, one-act play by English writer Michael Hastings. It premièred at the Royal Court Theatre Upstairs in 1979 with Winston Ntshona performing and Rufus Collins directing, and was revised by the author for a production at Ovalhouse in 2001.

== Plot ==
The play is a monologue by Gabriel Nkoke - a man born in Nigeria but raised almost all his life in England. He describes himself as "the new type of man. I'm neither here, nor there" - delivered to an unseen representative of the National Front, which Gabriel is at first seen trying to join because he agrees with their racialist agenda.

== Critical reception ==
The play was received favourably by critics and described as "Swiftian".
