= A Life in the Theatre (1979 film) =

- Genre: Comedy; Drama
- Based on: A Life in the Theatre by David Mamet
- Screenplay by: David Mamet
- Directed by: Kirk Browning; Gerald Gutierrez
- Starring: Peter Evans; Ellis Rabb
- Country of origin: United States
- Original language: English

Production
- Executive producer: Jac Venza
- Producer: Peter Weinberg

Original release
- Network: PBS
- Release: October 3, 1979

A Life in the Theatre is a 1979 American television film based on the play A Life in the Theatre by David Mamet. It stars Peter Evans and Ellis Rabb, reprising their roles from the original 1977 off-Broadway production.

== Plot ==
The story focuses on the relationship between two actors, the only characters. One, Robert, is a stage veteran while John is a young, promising actor. They are involved in a variety of productions, and gradually their relationship begins to change.

== Cast ==
- Peter Evans as John
- Ellis Rabb as Robert

== See also ==
- A Life in the Theatre (1993), a second television adaptation released in 1993 and starring Matthew Broderick and Jack Lemmon.
