= The Ploughman's Lunch =

- First edition cover (published screenplay)
- Directed by: Richard Eyre
- Written by: Ian McEwan
- Produced by: Simon Relph; Ann Scott
- Starring: Jonathan Pryce; Tim Curry; Charlie Dore; Rosemary Harris; Frank Finlay
- Cinematography: Clive Tickner
- Edited by: David Martin
- Music by: Dominic Muldowney
- Production company: Goldcrest Films
- Distributed by: Virgin Films
- Release date: May 1983 (United Kingdom)
- Running time: 107 minutes
- Country: United Kingdom
- Language: English

The Ploughman's Lunch is a 1983 British drama film written by Ian McEwan and directed by Richard Eyre, starring Jonathan Pryce, Tim Curry and Rosemary Harris.

The film examines the mass media in Margaret Thatcher's Britain around the time of the Falklands War. It was part of Channel 4's Film on Four strand, enjoying a critically lauded theatrical release before the television screenings.

== Plot ==
James Penfield is an ambitious London-based BBC radio reporter, from humble origins but Oxford-educated. He is commissioned to write a book on the Suez Crisis, claiming not to be a socialist; at that time, the Falklands War is dominating the British media.

He is attracted to Susan Barrington, a snobbish upper-class TV journalist, to whom he is introduced by his Oxford friend Jeremy Hancock, a fellow TV journalist. Although James is persistent, he cannot get further than a late night kiss from her and so Jeremy suggests that he contact her mother, the prominent left-wing historian Ann Barrington, who lives in Norfolk and is married to the advertising film director Matthew Fox. After learning that Ann wrote an article on the Suez Crisis on its tenth anniversary, James hopes to seduce the daughter by befriending the mother.

Now claiming in Ann's company to be a socialist, James soon finds himself spending more time with her than with her daughter; they have several long discussions and take long walks on the Norfolk Broads. Meanwhile, James' mother is dying and, James having earlier said to Susan that his parents were dead in order to disguise his origins, he is forced to identify her only as a relative when his father contacts him while he is with Ann. Returning to London, he is forced to ask for help from members of a women's peace camp after suffering a puncture. Initially mistaken for another BBC man, he shows some feigned sympathy towards the group protesting against the use of force outside a Norfolk airbase. Visiting Norfolk again a week later with an uninterested Susan, James walks alone with Ann, who kisses him and later has sex with him.

James returns to his work in London. Over a ploughman's lunch and beer with Matthew Fox, Fox consents to James having sex with his wife, since the two have slept in separate beds for the last three years. James refuses to take calls from Ann when she attempts to contact him at the BBC. He finally has another Oxford friend, an up-and-coming young poet, call her to end the relationship, while he sits idly by reading advertisements in Exchange and Mart.

James, Jeremy and Susan travel to Brighton together in James' Jaguar to cover the 1982 Conservative Party Conference. At the start of the conference, James begins to suspect that the other two are romantically involved, and asks Jeremy if he is up to something. Later, during the conference, he attempts to talk to Susan but she brushes him off; he then sees her and Jeremy caressing each other, having returned from a hotel room. The conference finishes with Thatcher's closing address as she rouses popular support following the Falklands War, and afterwards James confronts Jeremy in the Brighton Centre conference hall, rebuking him for having betrayed him; Jeremy tells him that he has known Susan for fifteen years and that they are "old allies".

James has a conversation with his publisher about the success of his book. He then attends his mother's funeral, standing grim-faced and aloof at his father's side, as he impatiently checks his watch.

== Cast ==
- Jonathan Pryce as James Penfield
- Tim Curry as Jeremy Hancock
- Charlie Dore as Susan Barrington
- Rosemary Harris as Ann Barrington
- Frank Finlay as Matthew Fox
- David de Keyser as Gold
- Bill Paterson as Lecturer
- Nat Jackley as Mr. Penfield
- David Lyon as Newsreader
- Orlando Wells as Tom Fox
- Ken Shorter as Squash Coach

== Production ==
Ian McEwan and Richard Eyre had made a television film together, The Imitation Game and wanted to collaborate again. In 1981 they discussed making a feature film. McEwan recalled they began with "vague" notions such as "Our film was to be set in the present and to be somehow ‘about’ the present. We wanted the textures of everyday London — the Underground, Brixton High Street — stylishly done." They wanted Jonathan Pryce to play the lead and were influenced by E.P. Thompson's collection of essays, Reading by Candlelight and Milan Kundera's novel, The Book of Laughter and Forgetting, along with the film Man of Tron. Eyre wrote, "I thought our subject might encompass the uses we make of the past, and the dangers, to an individual as well as to a nation, of living without a sense of history."

This led to the title "the ploughman's lunch" as it referred to an invented meal which had been incorporated as a fake past. McEwan and Eyre agreed this should be the basis of the film. McEwan then did research, visiting Poland, the Greenham Common peace camp, the Conservative and Labour Party conferences and watching news being made.

Francis Wheen helped McEwan research the script and later claimed that the character of Susan Barrington was based on Lucretia Stewart, Jeremy Hancock on Christopher Hitchens and James Penfield in part on Martin Amis.

While writing the script, the Falklands War began and this was incorporated into the story.

Finance came from Goldcrest, Channel 4 and Michael White.

== Reception ==
In The New York Times, Vincent Canby praised the film: "James Penfield, the journalist who glowers at the center of the fine new English film The Ploughman's Lunch, is a fascinating variation on all of the angry, low-born young men who populated British novels and plays in the late 1950s and 60s. Although he denies it, he is angry. At one point he says: 'You do everything right and you feel nothing. Either way.' His problem is that he feels everything all too acutely, but it doesn't make him a better person, only more devious. James Penfield is Jimmy Porter of Look Back in Anger updated to the 1980s, specifically to London during the 1982 Falkland war and the Tory leadership of Prime Minister Margaret Thatcher. The Ploughman's Lunch, the first theatrical film to be written by Ian McEwan and directed by Richard Eyre, is a witty, bitter tale of duplicity and opportunism in both private and public life...This is tricky stuff, but The Ploughman's Lunch blends fact with fiction with astonishing success."

=== Box office ===
Goldcrest Films invested £398,000 in the movie and received £271,000, a loss of £127,000.

== Notes ==
- McEwan, Ian (1985). "Introduction". The Ploughman's Lunch: the screenplay. Methuen.
- Forbes, Jill (Autumn 1983). "Crossover: McEwan and Eyre". Sight and Sound. p. 232.
