= A Flea in Her Ear (1968 film) =

1968 film by Jacques Charon

- Film poster by Mitchell Hooks
- Directed by: Jacques Charon
- Screenplay by: John Mortimer
- Based on: A Flea in Her Ear; 1907 play by Georges Feydeau
- Produced by: Fred Kohlmar
- Starring: Rex Harrison; Rosemary Harris; Louis Jourdan; Rachel Roberts
- Cinematography: Charles Lang
- Edited by: Walter A. Thompson
- Music by: Bronislau Kaper
- Distributed by: Twentieth Century Fox Film Corporation
- Release date: October 19, 1968 (France)
- Running time: 94 minutes
- Countries: United States; France
- Language: English
- Budget: $4,950,000

A Flea in Her Ear is a 1968 DeLuxe Color 20th Century Fox American/French feature Panavision film adaptation of the 1907 play A Flea in Her Ear by Georges Feydeau in an adaptation (originally written for the stage) by John Mortimer. It was directed by Jacques Charon and the cast included Rex Harrison, Rosemary Harris, Louis Jourdan, and Rachel Roberts.

== Plot ==
Gabrielle is convinced her attorney husband Victor is seeing another woman because of his inattention to her amorous needs. She sets up a meeting with her husband at a shady hotel, and he is completely unaware that the woman he is going to meet will be his own wife.

== Cast and crew ==
- Rex Harrison as Victor Chandebisse/Poche
- Rosemary Harris as Gabrielle Chandebisse
- Louis Jourdan as Henri Tournel
- Rachel Roberts as Suzanne de Castillian
- John Williams as Dr. Finache
- Edward Hardwicke as Pierre Chandebisse
- Georges Descrières as Don Carlos de Castilian
- Isla Blair as Antoinette, Charles's Wife
- Frank Thornton as Charles the Butler
- Victor Sen Yung as Oke Saki
- Grégoire Aslan as Max, Hotel Coq d'Or Owner
- Olivier Hussenot as Max's Uncle Louis

== Reception ==
According to Fox records the film required $8,450,000 in rentals to break even and by 11 December 1970 had made $2,250,000. In September 1970 the studio announced it had lost $3,736,000 on the film.

== See also ==
- List of American films of 1968
