= The Royal Family (play) =

1927 play written by George S. Kaufman and Edna Ferber

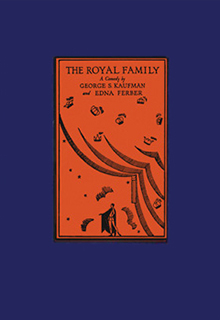
- First edition (1928)
- Original language: English
- Written by: George S. Kaufman; Edna Ferber
- Genre: Comedy
- Setting: a New York City duplex apartment in 1927

Premiere
- Date: 28 December 1927
- Place: Selwyn Theatre; New York City

The Royal Family is a play written by George S. Kaufman and Edna Ferber. Its premiere on Broadway was at the Selwyn Theatre on 28 December 1927, where it ran for 345 performances to close in October 1928. It was included in Burns Mantle's The Best Plays of 1927–1928.

== Plot ==
The exploits of the Barrymore-Drew family are parodied in this George S. Kaufman and Edna Ferber comedy.

== Characters ==
- Fanny Cavendish – Cavendish family matriarch
- Julie Cavendish – Fanny's daughter
- Tony Cavendish – Fanny's son
- Gwen Cavendish – Fanny's granddaughter
- Herbert Dean – Fanny's brother
- Kitty Dean – Fanny's sister-in-law
- Oscar Wolfe – Cavendish family's long-time agent
- Gilbert Marshall – Julie's love interest
- Perry Stewart – Gwen's fiancee

== Productions ==
The 1977 Great Performances presentation of the 1975 all star Broadway revival starring Rosemary Harris, Eva Le Gallienne, Sam Levene & Ellis Raab was released on DVD.

- In Britain, Noël Coward directed the West End version of the play in 1934, with a cast that included Marie Tempest as Fanny Cavendish, Madge Titheradge as Julie Cavendish and Laurence Olivier as Tony Cavendish. The play was retitled "Theatre Royal".
- The play was revived in the 1975–76 season on Broadway. Directed by Ellis Rabb, it starred Rosemary Harris as Julie Cavendish, George Grizzard as Tony, and Eva Le Gallienne as the theatrical matriarch, Fanny and Sam Levene as Oscar Wolfe. Rabb received the 1976 Tony Award for best director. The production was telecast on the PBS series Great Performances on November 9, 1977, with Rabb replacing Grizzard as Tony. This version was released on DVD.
- In 2001 Peter Hall directed a West End revival of the play (under its original title) with Judi Dench as Fanny, Harriet Walter as Julie and Toby Stephens as Tony; also in the cast were Peter Bowles, Julia McKenzie and Emily Blunt.
- 2009 on Broadway, with incidental music by Maury Yeston, at the Samuel J. Friedman Theatre, directed by Doug Hughes and starring Kelli Barrett as Gwen, Ana Gasteyer as Kitty, John Glover as Herbert, Rosemary Harris as Fanny, Jan Maxwell as Julie, Larry Pine as Gilbert, Tony Roberts as Oscar, and Reg Rogers as Tony Cavendish.

== Adaptations ==
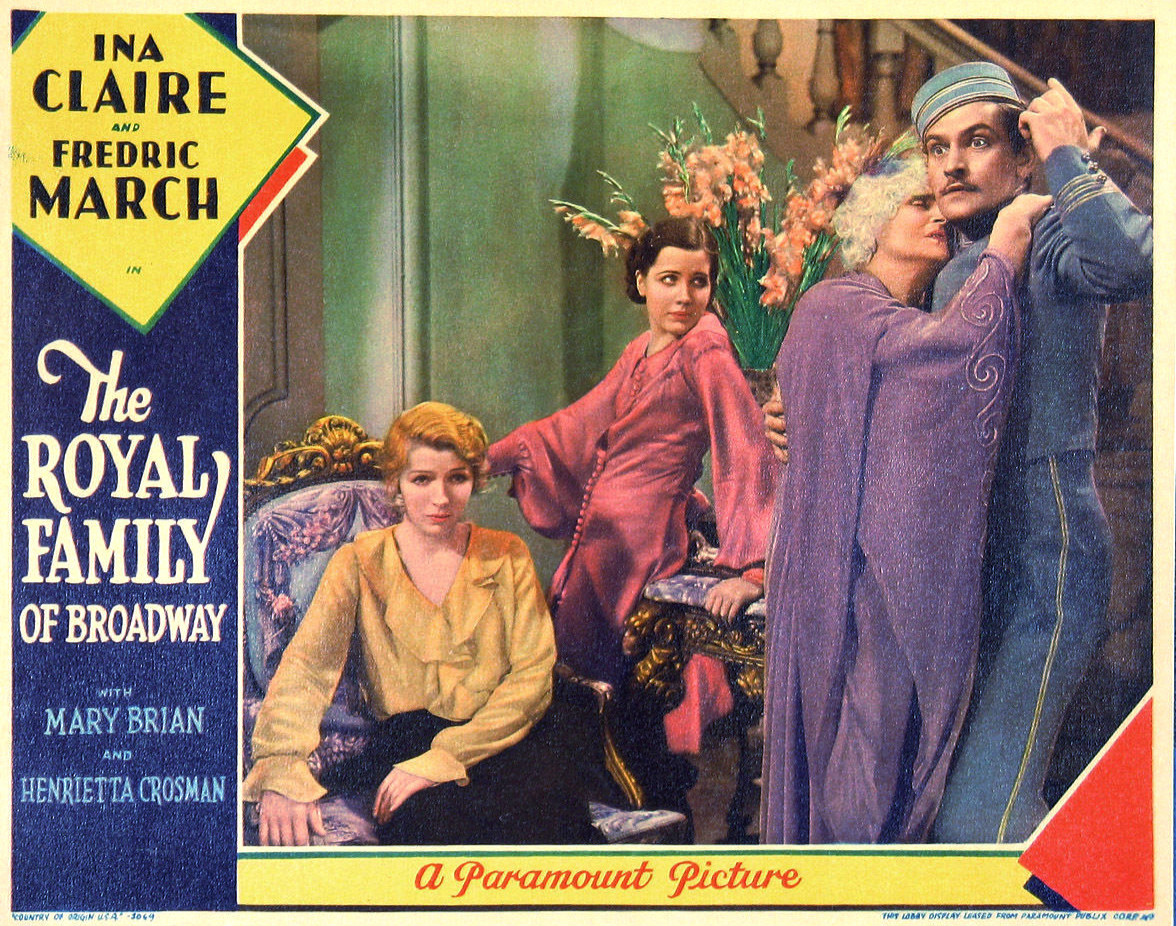
Lobby card for The Royal Family of Broadway (1930)

The play was adapted in 1930 by Herman Mankiewicz for the film The Royal Family of Broadway, released by Paramount Pictures. The film was directed by George Cukor and Cyril Gardner, and stars Ina Claire and Fredric March.

Several live television adaptions were produced, including one in 1952, a BBC film for television, starring Morton Lowry as Tony Cavendish and Charmion King as Julia, re-named as "Theatre Royal".

== Awards and nominations ==
Awards

- 1975 Drama Desk Award for Outstanding Revival of a Play
- 2010 Nominated for Best Revival of a Play
