= Michael Hastings (playwright) =

British playwright and writer (1938 – 2011)

- Born: Michael Gerald Hastings; 2 September 1938; London, England, United Kingdom
- Died: 19 November 2011 (aged 73); United Kingdom
- Occupations: Writer, playwright

Michael Gerald Hastings (2 September 1938 – 19 November 2011) was a British playwright, screenwriter, and occasional novelist and poet.

He is best known for his 1984 stage play and 1994 screenplay Tom & Viv, about the poet T.S. Eliot and his wife Vivienne Haigh-Wood.

== Biography ==
Hastings was born in London, UK. His early plays – Don't Destroy Me (1956), Yes - and After (1957) – reflected the influence of the Angry Young Men movement and his brief involvement with the circle surrounding Colin Wilson.

Hastings later enjoyed mainstream West End success with Gloo Joo (1978), a farce about a West Indian threatened with deportation from the United Kingdom, which won the Evening Standard Comedy of the Year Award in 1979. He wrote numerous stage plays, television screenplays and, in addition to the Tom & Viv film, scripts for two motion pictures, The American (1998) and The Nightcomers (1971, based on the Henry James novella The Turn of the Screw and starring Marlon Brando). Hastings also wrote two libretti for Michael Nyman: Man and Boy: Dada (2003, assisted by Victoria Hardie) and Love Counts (2005).

Hastings published his first novel, The Game, in 1957, followed in 1960 by The Frauds. His 1970 novel Tussy is Me – about Eleanor Marx – won him the Somerset Maugham Award. As a poet, he published one collection, Love Me, Lambeth, and Other Poems, in 1961, and his work appeared in Michael Horovitz's 1969 anthology Children of Albion: Poetry of the Underground in Britain.

Hastings died aged 73 on 19 November 2011.

His 1973 play The Cutting of the Cloth, based on his experiences in the 1950s as an apprentice tailor, was produced posthumously. Directed by Tricia Thorns, it was given its world premiere at London's Southwark Playhouse in March 2015. Thorns subsequently revived Hastings' first play, Don't Destroy Me, at the Arcola Theatre in January 2024.

== Selected works ==
=== Theatre ===
- Don't Destroy Me (1956)
- Yes - and After (1957)
- The World's Baby (1965)
- For the West (TV play) (1965) AKA For the West (Congo)
- Blue as His Eyes the Tin Helmet He Wore (TV play) (1966)
- The Silence of Lee Harvey Oswald (1966) AKA Lee Harvey Oswald: A Far Mean Streak of Independence Brought on by Negleck (sic)
- The Silence of Saint-Just (1972)
- The Cutting of the Cloth (written 1973)
- For the West (1977) AKA For the West (Uganda)
- Gloo Joo (1978)
- Full Frontal (1979)
- Carnival War a Go Hot (1979)
- Murder Rap (TV play) (1980)
- Midnight at the Starlight (TV play) (1980)
- Tom & Viv (1984)
- The Emperor (with Jonathan Miller) (1987)
- A Dream of People (1990)
- Unfinished Business (1993)
- Calico (2004)

=== Television ===
- Gloo Joo (1979)

=== Books ===
Fiction

- The Game (1957)
- The Frauds (1960)
- Tussy Is Me (1970)
- The Nightcomers (1971; based on his own screenplay)
- And in the Forest the Indians (1975)
- Bart's Mornings and Other Tales of Modern Brazil (1975) (short stories)

Non-fiction

- Rupert Brooke: The Handsomest Young Man in England (1967)
- Sir Richard Burton: A Biography (1978)

Poetry

- Love Me, Lambeth, and Other Poems (1961)
