= A Life in the Theatre (1993 film) =

1993 film by Gregory Mosher

- Genre: Comedy; Drama
- Based on: A Life in the Theatre by David Mamet
- Screenplay by: David Mamet
- Directed by: Gregory Mosher
- Starring: Matthew Broderick; Jack Lemmon
- Music by: David Michael Frank
- Country of origin: United States
- Original language: English

Production
- Executive producers: Marc Abraham; David Mamet
- Producers: Thomas A. Bliss; Patricia Wolff
- Cinematography: Freddie Francis
- Editor: Barbara Tulliver
- Running time: 78 minutes
- Production companies: Beacon Communications; Bay Kinescope Boston

Original release
- Network: TNT
- Release: October 9, 1993

A Life in the Theatre is a 1993 American made-for-television comedy-drama film starring Matthew Broderick and Jack Lemmon. The film premiered on TNT on October 9, 1993. It is based on David Mamet's 1977 play of the same name. Lemmon was nominated for a Golden Globe Award for his portrayal of Robert.

This is the second adaptation of Mamet's play following the 1979 version.

== Plot ==
The story focuses on the relationship between two actors, the only characters in the film. One, Robert, is a stage veteran while John is a young, promising actor. They are involved in a variety of productions, and gradually their relationship begins to change.

== Cast ==
- Matthew Broderick as John
- Jack Lemmon as Robert
