= A Life in the Theatre =

Play written by David Mamet

- Poster for the 2010 Broadway Revival
- Written by: David Mamet
- Characters: Robert (stage veteran) John (young actor)
- Original language: English
- Genre: Comedy

Premiere
- Date premiered: 1977
- Place premiered: Theatre De Lys
- Official website

A Life in the Theatre is a 1977 play by David Mamet.

It focuses on the relationship between two actors, the play's only characters. One, Robert, is a stage veteran while John is a young, promising actor. As the play goes on they are involved in a variety of productions, and gradually their relationship begins to change.

== Production history ==
It was first produced in the US at the Goodman Theatre, Chicago, Illinois, in February 1977, with Mike Nussbaum and Joe Mantegna and directed by Gregory Mosher. It was revived at the Goodman in March 2006, directed by Artistic Director Robert Falls.

The play premiered Off-Broadway at the Lucille Lortel Theatre (then the Theatre De Lys) in October 1977 through July 1978, with Ellis Rabb as Robert and Peter Evans as John and directed by Gerald Gutierrez. It was again produced Off-Broadway at the Jewish Repertory Theatre in February 1992 through March 1992, with F. Murray Abraham as Robert and Anthony Fusco as John.

It was the featured play at UCSC's Shakespeare Santa Cruz summer festival in 1986, with Trevor Baxter and Paul Whitworth.

Notable UK productions include a run at London's Apollo Theatre, from February 2 to April 30, 2005, with Patrick Stewart as Robert and Joshua Jackson playing John, and an Edinburgh Fringe production in 2008 by Schadenfreude Productions, with David Cann as Robert and Jonathan Rhodes as John.

Another revival featuring Patrick Stewart and T.R. Knight and directed by Neil Pepe began performances on Broadway in a limited engagement, opened officially on October 12, 2010, for a 15-week run, through January 2, 2011. However, after mixed critical reviews and low box office returns, the show closed on November 28, 2010, after 24 previews and 56 regular performances.

Opened for a three-week run on January 31, 2019, at The Arctic Playhouse.

== Adaptations ==
The play was first adapted into a 1979 television film A Life in the Theatre, with Peter Evans and Ellis Rabb reprising their roles from the 1977 Off-Broadway production.

The play was adapted into another television movie in 1993. The teleplay was written by David Mamet. It was directed by Gregory Mosher, and starred Matthew Broderick and Jack Lemmon.
