= Tom & Viv =

- Theatrical release poster
- Directed by: Brian Gilbert
- Screenplay by: Michael Hastings; Adrian Hodges
- Based on: Tom & Viv by Michael Hastings
- Produced by: Harvey Kass; Marc Samuelson; Peter Samuelson
- Starring: Willem Dafoe; Miranda Richardson; Rosemary Harris; Tim Dutton; Nickolas Grace
- Cinematography: Martin Fuhrer
- Edited by: Tony Lawson
- Music by: Debbie Wiseman
- Distributed by: Entertainment Film Distributors; Miramax Films
- Release dates: 15 April 1994 (United Kingdom); 2 December 1994 (United States)
- Running time: 115 minutes
- Countries: United Kingdom; United States
- Language: English
- Budget: $7 million
- Box office: $0.75 million (UK/USA)

Tom & Viv is a 1994 historical drama film directed by Brian Gilbert, based on the 1984 play of the same name by British playwright Michael Hastings about the early love life of American poet T. S. Eliot. The film stars Willem Dafoe, Miranda Richardson, Rosemary Harris, Tim Dutton, and Nickolas Grace.

== Premise ==
The film tells the story of the relationship between T. S. Eliot and his first wife, Vivienne Haigh-Wood Eliot. They were married in 1915 after a brief courtship and, although they separated in 1933, they never divorced.

== Cast ==
- Willem Dafoe as T. S. Eliot
- Miranda Richardson as Vivienne Haigh-Wood
- Rosemary Harris as Rose Haigh-Wood
- Tim Dutton as Maurice Haigh-Wood
- Nickolas Grace as Bertrand Russell
- Geoffrey Bayldon as Harwent
- Clare Holman as Louise Purdon
- Philip Locke as Charles Haigh-Wood
- Joanna McCallum as Virginia Woolf
- Joseph O'Conor as Bishop of Oxford
- Michael Attwell as W.L. Janes
- Sharon Bower as Secretary
- Linda Spurrier as Edith Sitwell
- Roberta Taylor as Ottoline Morrell
- Christopher Baines as Verger
- Anna Chancellor as Woman
- John Clegg as Second Man
- James Greene as Dr. Cryiax
- Simon McBurney as Dr. Reginald Miller

== Release ==
The film opened on 15 April 1994 on 37 screens in the United Kingdom and grossed £61,070 in its opening weekend. After 10 days, it had grossed £142,674 and dropped out of the top 15. On 2 December 1994, the film opened at the Westside Pavilion in Los Angeles for a one week Oscars qualifying run and at Cinema 2 in New York City before its regular run in January 1995. It grossed $21,968 in its opening weekend and grossed $538,534 in the United States and Canada.

== Reception ==
The film received mixed reviews. It holds a 36% approval rating on review aggregate Rotten Tomatoes, based on 14 reviews, with an average rating of 5.20/10. Owen Gleiberman of Entertainment Weekly praised the performances, but gave the film a B−, saying '[it] is the kind of sodden, tasteful, here-are-a-few-nasty-warts-to-chew-on biography that raises as many dramatic questions as it answers.' Derek Elley of Variety admired the film's artistic aspirations and production values, but called it, 'a handsomely appointed but overly starchy love story that attains real clout only in the final reel.'

=== Awards ===
The film was nominated for Academy Awards for Best Actress in a Leading Role (Miranda Richardson) and Best Actress in a Supporting Role (Rosemary Harris). The National Board of Review also gave awards to Richardson as Best Actress and Harris as Best Supporting Actress for their performances in the film.

=== Year-end lists ===
- 9th – National Board of Review
