= Miranda Richardson =

British actress (born 1958)

- Richardson in 2026
- Born: Miranda Jane Richardson; 3 March 1958 (age 68); Southport, Lancashire, England
- Education: Bristol Old Vic Theatre School
- Occupation: Actress
- Years active: 1978–present
- Works: Full list
- Awards: Full list

Miranda Jane Richardson (born 3 March 1958) is an English actress. Known for her performances on stage and screen across a wide range of dramatic and comedic roles, she has received numerous accolades, including a British Academy Film Award and two Golden Globes, as well as nominations for two Academy Awards, three British Academy Television Awards, a Laurence Olivier Award, and a Primetime Emmy Award.

After graduating from the Bristol Old Vic Theatre School, Richardson began her career in 1979 and made her West End debut in the 1981 play Moving, before being nominated for the 1987 Laurence Olivier Award for Best Actress for A Lie of the Mind.

Richardson has been nominated for the Academy Award for Best Supporting Actress for Damage and the Academy Award for Best Actress for Tom & Viv. A seven-time BAFTA Award nominee, she won the BAFTA Award for Best Actress in a Supporting Role for Damage. She has also been nominated for seven Golden Globes, winning twice for Enchanted April and the TV film Fatherland.

Her other films include Empire of the Sun, The Crying Game, Sleepy Hollow, The Hours, and Spider. She also played a comedic version of Queen Elizabeth I in all six episodes of the sitcom Blackadder II, and appeared in one episode each of Blackadder the Third and Blackadder Goes Forth.

Richardson also voiced Mrs Melisha Tweedy in DreamWorks Pictures and Aardman's 2000 stop-motion film Chicken Run. She later reprised the role in its 2023 Netflix sequel Chicken Run: Dawn of the Nugget.

== Early life ==
Richardson was born in Southport, Lancashire. She recalls "a cinema about 50 yards from my house. So Saturday mornings were spent with The ABC Minors: the Saturday cinema club with the theme song set to the tune of Blaze Away by Abe Holzmann, a red ball bouncing over the lyrics so you could sing along. As I got older, I would go to the cinema by myself to watch matinees of westerns and historical Technicolor dramas."

== Career ==
=== Theatre ===
Richardson enrolled at the Bristol Old Vic Theatre School, where she studied alongside Daniel Day-Lewis and Jenny Seagrove, having started out with juvenile performances in Cinderella and Lord Arthur Savile's Crime at the Southport Dramatic Club.

Richardson joined the Manchester Library Theatre in 1979 as an assistant stage manager, followed by making a number of appearances in repertory theatre. Her London stage debut was in Moving at the Queen's Theatre in 1981. She found recognition in the West End for a series of stage performances, ultimately receiving an Olivier Award nomination for her performance in A Lie of the Mind, and, in 1996, she appeared in the single-actor theatrical adaptation of Orlando at the Edinburgh Festival. She returned to the London stage in May 2009 to play the lead role in Wallace Shawn's new play, Grasses of a Thousand Colours at the Royal Court Theatre. Richardson has said that she prefers new works rather than the classics because of the history that goes with them.

=== Film and television ===
In 1985, Richardson made her film debut as Ruth Ellis, the last woman to be hanged in the United Kingdom, in the biographical drama Dance with a Stranger. Around the same time, Richardson played a comedic version of Queen Elizabeth I, aka Queenie, in the British television comedy Blackadder II. Richardson returned in guest roles in one episode each in Blackadder the Third (1987) and Blackadder Goes Forth (1989). She returned to play Queenie in the Christmas special Blackadder's Christmas Carol (1988) and, later, played Field Nurse in a special edition for the millennium Blackadder: Back and Forth.

Following Dance with a Stranger, Richardson turned down numerous parts in which her character was unstable or disreputable, including the Glenn Close role in Fatal Attraction. In this period, she appeared in Empire of the Sun (1987) and was nominated for the BAFTA Television Award for Best Actress for her role as Penny in After Pilkington (1987). In an episode of the TV series The Storyteller ("The Three Ravens", 1988), she played a witch.

Richardson starred as Charlie Maguire in Fatherland (1994), for which she was nominated for the Golden Globe Award for Best Supporting Actress – Series, Miniseries or Television Film. Other television roles in this period include Pamela Flitton in A Dance to the Music of Time (1997), Miss Gilchrist in St. Ives (1998), Bettina the interior decorator in Absolutely Fabulous and Queen Elspeth, Snow White's stepmother, in Snow White: The Fairest of Them All (2001).

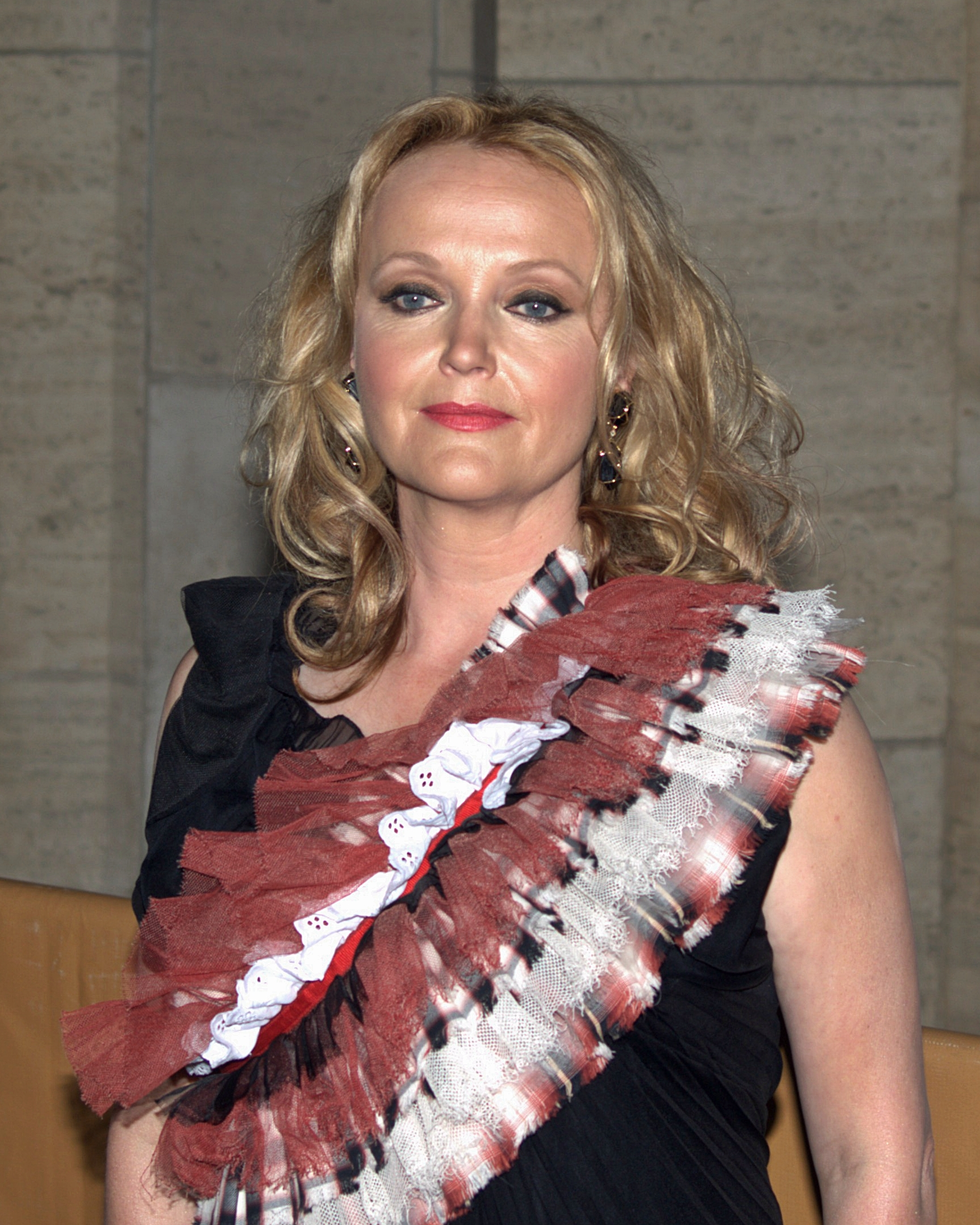
Richardson at Metropolitan Opera's 2010–2011 Season Opening Night of Das Rheingold

Richardson has appeared in supporting roles in film, including Vanessa Bell in The Hours (2002), Lady Van Tassel in Sleepy Hollow (1999) and Patsy Carpenter in The Evening Star (1996). For her role in Sleepy Hollow she was nominated for the Saturn Award for Best Supporting Actress and won the Blockbuster Entertainment Award for Favorite Supporting Actress – Horror. She also won acclaim for her performances in The Crying Game (1992) and Enchanted April (1992), for which she won a Golden Globe. She received Academy Award nominations for her performances in Damage (1992) and Tom & Viv (1994).

Her film credits also include Kansas City (1996), The Apostle (1997) and Wah-Wah (2005). She voiced Mrs Tweedy, the main antagonist, in the stop-motion animated film, Chicken Run (2000). In 2002, she performed a triple role in the thriller Spider.

In 2003, Richardson played Mary of Teck in the miniseries The Lost Prince, for which she was nominated for both BAFTA Television Award for Best Actress and the Golden Globe Award for Best Actress in a Miniseries or Motion Picture Made for Television. She also starred as Hermione Granger in a Comic Relief sketch called Harry Potter and the Secret Chamberpot of Azibaijan.

Richardson appeared as Queen Rosalind of Denmark in The Prince and Me and as the ballet mistress Madame Giry in the film version of the Andrew Lloyd Webber musical The Phantom of the Opera (2004). In 2005, she appeared in the role of Rita Skeeter, the toxic Daily Prophet journalist in Harry Potter and the Goblet of Fire. She later reprised the role of Rita Skeeter in a cameo in Harry Potter and the Deathly Hallows: Part 1 (2010).

Richardson voiced Corky in The Adventures of Bottle Top Bill and His Best Friend Corky (2005), an Australian animated series for children. In 2006, she appeared in Gideon's Daughter. In 2007 she played Mrs Claus in the film Fred Claus (2007) and appeared in the BBC sitcom, The Life and Times of Vivienne Vyle (2007).

In 2008, Richardson was cast in a leading role in the original AMC television pilot, Rubicon. She plays Katherine Rhumor, a New York socialite who finds herself drawn into the central intrigue of a think tank after the death of her husband. The following year, she portrayed Princess Victoria of Saxe-Coburg-Saalfeld, Duchess of Kent in film The Young Victoria (2009).

Richardson played Labour Party politician Barbara Castle in the British film Made in Dagenham (2010). She was nominated for a BAFTA Award for Best Actress in a Supporting Role for this role. In 2012, she played roles in the BBC comedy television series Dead Boss, historical drama series World Without End, based on the 1989 Ken Follett novel The Pillars of the Earth, and historical drama series Parade's End, based on Ford Madox Ford's eponymous novel cycle (1924–1928). In 2013, she played Lady Ashford in the film Belle (2013).

In 2012, Richardson was cast as Queen Ulla in Disney's live action film Maleficent (2014), where she was to play the titular character's aunt, but her role was cut from the film during post-production. In 2015, she played Sybil Birling in Helen Edmundson's BBC One adaptation of J. B. Priestley's An Inspector Calls.

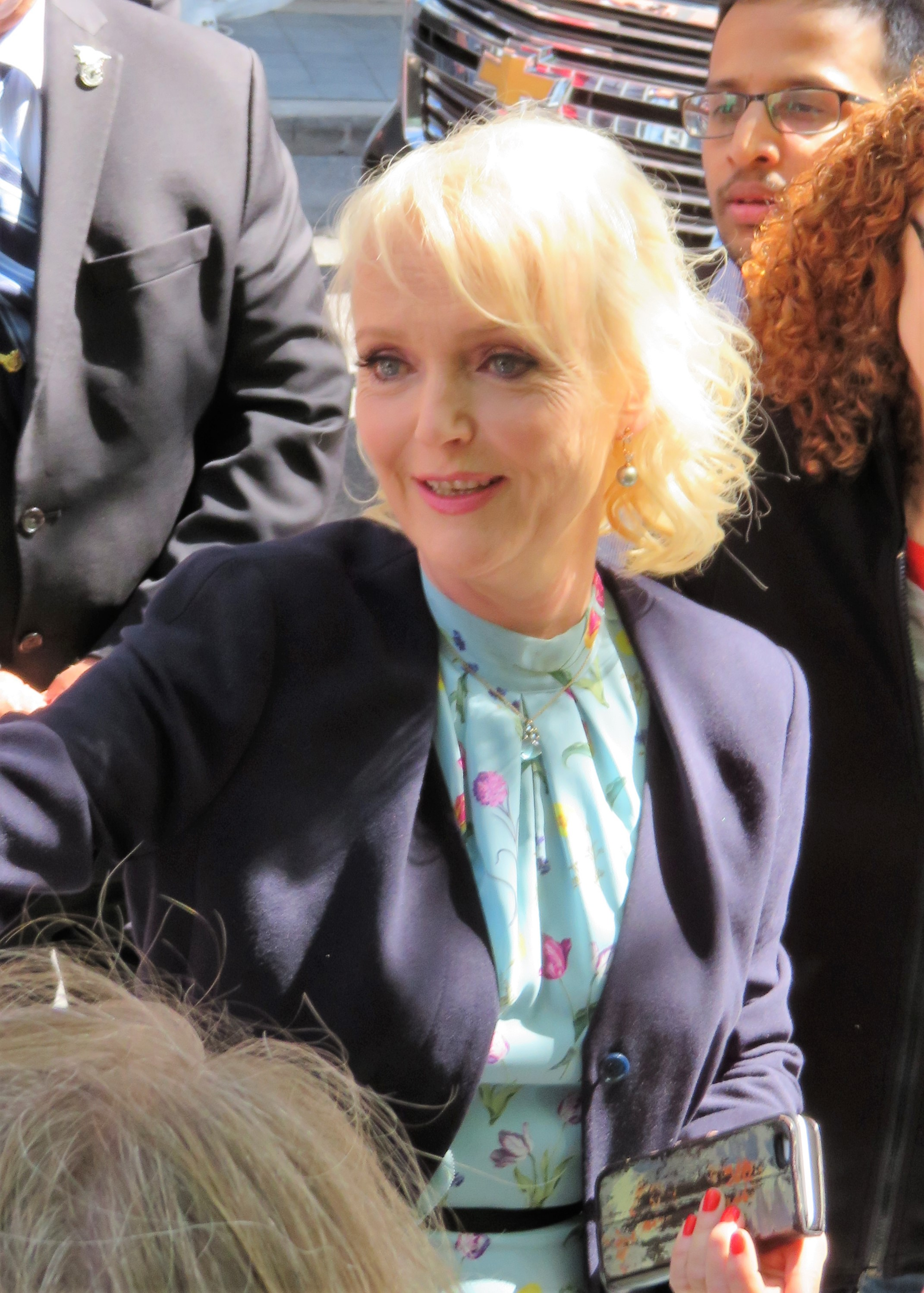
Richardson in 2017

In 2015, she played Hilda Lorimer in the film Testament of Youth and was cast as Emily Brent in BBC One's three-part adaptation of Dame Agatha Christie's 1939 novel And Then There Were None. In 2017, she portrayed Clementine Churchill in the biopic film Churchill and starred in the films Stronger and iBoy.

In 2019, Richardson voiced Pinky's Grandma in animated television series Pinky Malinky and played Lou Collins in seven episodes of television series Curfew. In 2020, Richardson starred in the Australian comedy drama film Rams.

Richardson reprised her role as the voice of Mrs Tweedy in the 2023 film, Chicken Run: Dawn of the Nugget.

Richardson is due to appear in an upcoming biopic about conductor Sergiu Celibidache, The Yellow Tie, and in the British film The Bitter End.

== Personal life ==
Richardson's hobbies include dog walking, gardening and falconry. In 2013, she began learning the cello.
