= After Pilkington =

1987 British television film

- Genre: Drama
- Written by: Simon Gray
- Directed by: Christopher Morahan
- Starring: Bob Peck; Miranda Richardson; Gary Waldhorn; Barry Foster; Reina James; Richard Brenner
- Country of origin: United Kingdom
- Original language: English

Production
- Running time: 100 minutes

Original release
- Release: 25 January 1987

After Pilkington is a BBC television drama film written by Simon Gray, starring Miranda Richardson, Bob Peck and Barry Foster. It was first broadcast as part of BBC Two's Screen Two series, in 1987.

== Plot ==
The quiet life of Oxford professor James Westgate (Bob Peck) is shattered when he is introduced to Penny (Miranda Richardson), the wife of his crass new colleague (Barry Foster). Westgate recognises her as his childhood sweetheart "Patch", and the two resume their friendship. Westgate is bored with his mundane college life, including his German friend Boris, who experiments on animals in the lab, and his lady friend Amanda, as well as the attentions of a shy male student who claims to be in love with him. He is only too happy to be diverted into joining Penny/Patch in her search for missing archaeologist Pilkington (a fellow Oxford colleague). As Westgate's obsession with his childhood friend grows, he is drawn into a tangle of misunderstanding, intrigue, and murder. Bob Peck imbues his character with comic ineptitude.

The film frequently has the 4th movement from Schubert's Trout Quintet on the soundtrack.

== Awards and nominations ==
- Best Actress (nomination): Miranda Richardson - BAFTA TV Awards
- Best Fiction (won) - Prix Italia

== Cast ==
- Bob Peck as James Westgate
- Miranda Richardson as Penny 'Patch' Newhouse
- Reina James as Amanda
- Gary Waldhorn as Boris
- Barry Foster as Derek
- Sarah Butler as Young Penny
- Richard Grant as Young James
- Richard Brenner as Wilkins
- Mary Miller as Deirdre Pilkington
- Derek Ware as Pilkington
- Nigel Nevinson as Doctor
- John Gill as Pottsy
