= Ellis Rabb =

American actor (1930–1998)

- Born: Ellis Williamson Rabb; June 20, 1930; Memphis, Tennessee, U.S.
- Died: January 11, 1998 (aged 67); Memphis, Tennessee, U.S.
- Spouse: Rosemary Harris (m. 1959; div. 1967)
- Awards: Tony Award for Best Direction of a Play; 1976 The Royal Family

Ellis W. Rabb (June 20, 1930 – January 11, 1998) was an American actor and director.

In 1959 he formed the Association of Producing Artists, a theatre company that brought new works and noteworthy revivals to Broadway and to regional theatres. The APA merged with the Phoenix Theatre in 1964 and as the APA-Phoenix went on to mount Broadway revivals of Man and Superman, The Show Off, Right You Are If You Think You Are, and Hamlet (in which Rabb played the title role) among others, with the APA-Phoenix receiving a special Tony Award for distinguished achievement prior to disbanding in 1969.

== Life ==
Rabb was born the only child of Clark Williamson Rabb and Mary Carolyn (nee Ellis). His subsequent work as an actor included starring in the New York City premiere of David Mamet's A Life in the Theatre in 1977 at Off-Broadway's Theatre de Lys, and in 1980 he played the title role in The Man Who Came to Dinner at the Circle in the Square Theatre.

His later directing work included a 1973 production of A Streetcar Named Desire, starring Rosemary Harris (to whom he was married from 1959 to 1967), James Farentino, and Patricia Conolly; a memorable all star Broadway revival of The Royal Family starring Rosemary Harris, Sam Levene, George Grizzard and Eva LeGalliene in 1975 for which he won both a Tony Award and a Drama Desk Award, and a 1983 revival of You Can't Take It with You with Jason Robards and Colleen Dewhurst. His final Broadway production was his own adaptation of Arthur Schnitzler's The Loves of Anatol. Rabb's production of The Royal Family was filmed for the PBS series Great Performances on November 9, 1977; this version was released on DVD. Rabb replaced George Grizzard, who left due to prior commitments, in the role of Tony Cavendish in the Broadway revival of The Royal Family shortly after the revival opened and appeared in the PBS production as well.

Rabb appeared in Cheers playing an imaginary spy and then a poet in the episode "The Spy Who Came in for a Cold One". He was unmasked as the former by Diane Chambers and as the latter by Coach but was then found to be telling the truth when he claimed he was wealthy. Former Cheers star Kelsey Grammer has stated that Rabb, whom Grammer had known, was his main inspiration for the voice of Sideshow Bob on The Simpsons.

Rabb died of heart failure at a Memphis, Tennessee hospital on January 11, 1998.
