= Vivienne Haigh-Wood Eliot =

American poet and first wife of T. S. Eliot (1888–1947)

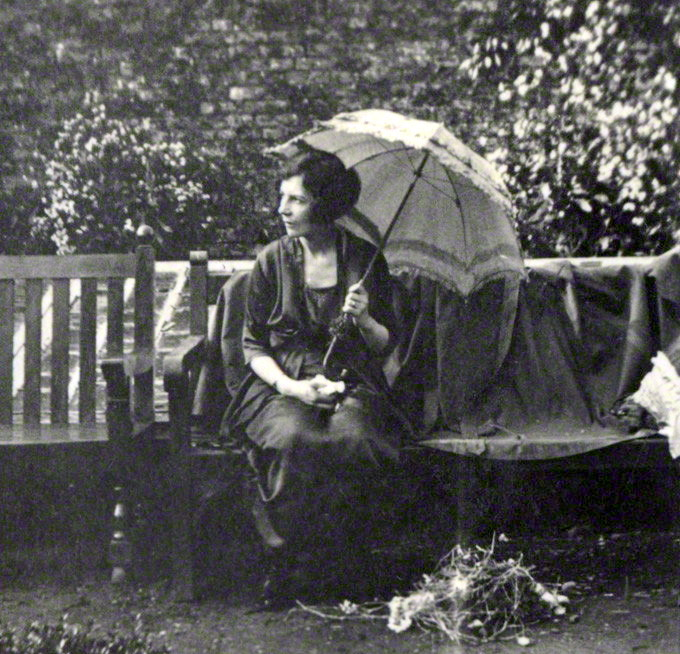
- Vivienne Haigh-Wood Eliot photographed by Lady Ottoline Morrell, 1920
- Born: Vivienne Haigh; 28 May 1888; Bury, Lancashire, England
- Died: 22 January 1947 (aged 58); Harringay, Middlesex, England
- Resting place: Pinner Cemetery, London
- Occupations: Governess, writer
- Spouse: T. S. Eliot (m. 1915; sep. 1933)

Vivienne Haigh-Wood Eliot (also Vivien, born Vivienne Haigh; 28 May 1888 – 22 January 1947) was the first wife of American-British poet T. S. Eliot, whom she married in 1915, less than three months after their introduction by mutual friends, when Vivienne was a governess in Cambridge and Eliot was studying at Oxford.

Vivienne had many serious health problems, beginning with tuberculosis of the arm as a child, and the marriage appeared to exacerbate her mental health issues. Eliot would not consider divorce, but formally separated from Vivienne in 1933. She was later committed to an asylum by her brother, against her will, eventually dying there apparently from a heart attack, but possibly by deliberate overdose. When told via a phone call from the asylum that Vivienne had died unexpectedly during the night, Eliot is said to have buried his face in his hands and cried out "Oh God, oh God".

Both Vivienne and T. S. Eliot stated that Ezra Pound had encouraged Vivienne to marry Eliot as a pretext for the poet to remain in England, where Eliot and Pound believed he would have greater career success, but also against the wishes of his family who wanted him to return to the United States. Neither set of parents were informed of the wedding beforehand. Vivienne made creative contributions to her husband's work during their 18-year marriage, but it was a difficult relationship. Both had mental and physical health problems, and it is often cited as the inspiration for The Waste Land, which remains Eliot's most noted work. He consulted with Vivienne, refusing to release a section of the poem until she had approved it. Eliot later said: 'To her the marriage brought no happiness ... to me it brought the state of mind out of which came The Waste Land.' Research into their relationship has been hampered by lack of access to her diaries, the copyright of which was granted to Eliot's widow Valerie Eliot, but surviving letters have been published.

== Early life ==
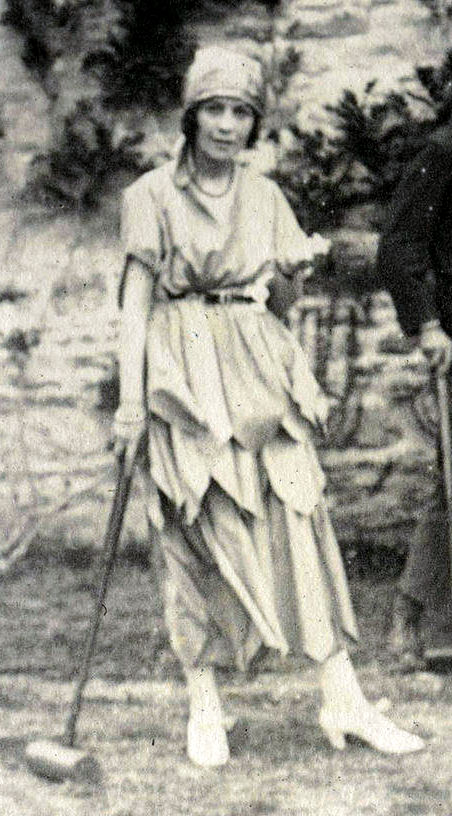
Haigh-Wood in 1921

Vivienne Haigh-Wood was born in Knowsley Street, Bury, Lancashire, the first child of Rose Esther (née Robinson; 1860–1941) and Charles Haigh-Wood (né Wood; 1854–1927), an artist and member of the Royal Academy of Arts. Charles was local to the area, but his wife was born in London where the couple had been living, and they had returned to Bury for an exhibition of Charles's paintings at a gentleman's club, with Rose Esther heavily pregnant. The journey may have triggered the birth earlier than expected, and Haigh-Wood was born in Lancashire rather than London.

She was registered at birth as Vivienne Haigh, though as an adult she called herself Haigh-Wood, and later spelt her first name Vivien. Her paternal grandfather was Charles Wood, a gilder and picture framer from Bolton, so her father called himself Charles Haigh-Wood to distinguish himself. The "Haigh" came from his mother, Mary Haigh, originally from Dublin. Mary Haigh had inherited seven semi-detached houses in Kingstown (now Dún Laoghaire), a Dublin suburb, which gave the family financial stability, allowing Haigh-Wood's father to study at the Manchester Art College and the Royal Academy Schools in London.

Charles Haigh-Wood inherited his mother's property when she died, as well as the family home at 14 Albion Place, Walmersley Road, Bury, and he became a landlord, which allowed him to move his wife and Vivienne to Hampstead, a fashionable part of north London. They settled into a house there at 3 Compayne Gardens around 1891. Vivienne's brother, Maurice, was born there in 1896; he went on to train at Sandhurst and fought during the First World War. Although the family was clearly well-to-do, Seymour-Jones writes that Vivienne was ashamed of her connection to Lancashire, perceived as working-class, and was left with a sense of inferiority that made her self-conscious and snobbish, especially when mixing with Eliot's aristocratic London friends.

=== Health and education ===
Little is known of her education. Vivienne played the piano, painted, took ballet lessons, was a good swimmer, and worked for a short time as a governess for a family in Cambridge. She had multiple health problems. She was diagnosed with tuberculosis of the bone in her left arm when she was a child; this was before the discovery of antibiotics and apparently little could be done about it. She was treated by Sir Frederick Treves and said she had had so many operations, she had no memory of her life before the age of seven.

She was also plagued by heavy, irregular menstruation, to her great embarrassment, and severe pre-menstrual tension, which led to mood swings, fainting spells, and migraines. She would insist on washing her own bedlinen, often twice a day, and would take her sheets home with her to clean when on holiday, once leading a hotel to claim she had stolen them, to Eliot's dismay. She apparently felt unable to ask her mother for help. Eventually her mother took her to a doctor who prescribed potassium bromide to sedate her, which probably meant he had diagnosed "hysteria". Virginia Woolf described Vivienne on 8 November 1930 in her diary:

Oh – Vivienne! Was there ever such a torture since life began! – to bear her on one's shoulders, biting, wriggling, raving, scratching, unwholesome, powdered, insane, yet sane to the point of insanity, reading his letters, thrusting herself on us, coming in wavering trembling ... This bag of ferrets is what Tom [Eliot] wears round his neck.

As the medical bills rose, so did her family's resentment of her. Her brother, Maurice, blamed her for what he saw as his second-rate education, because there was no money left to send him to public school. She became engaged to a schoolteacher, Charles Buckle, in 1914, but Buckle's mother was apparently unhappy about it. Vivienne's health problems persuaded Rose Haigh-Wood that her daughter had "moral insanity." She decided that Vivienne should not marry or bear children, and withdrew the family's consent to the marriage.

== Relationship with T. S. Eliot ==
=== First meeting ===
On writing

I think at first, until one has got the spout of this long disused fountain clear, it is better to let the water burst out when it will and so force away the accumulation of decayed vegetation, moss, slime and dead fish which are thick upon and around it.

— Vivienne Haigh-Wood

Haigh-Wood met Tom Eliot on or around March 1915 at a dance in London, where he took tea with her and a friend. They met again shortly after that at a lunch party in Scofield Thayer's rooms at Magdalen College, Oxford. (Note: Carole Seymour-Jones writes that they first met in London in March 1914 at a party in a hotel, as does James Edwin Miller. In Painted Shadow, Seymour-Jones writes that Eliot first saw Haigh-Wood while she was punting in Oxford, and was first introduced to her at a lunch party held by Scofield Thayer in Magdalen College in or around March 1914.) Eliot and Thayer, both from privileged backgrounds, had been at Harvard together, where Eliot had studied philosophy, and both had arrived in Oxford on scholarships.

According to another friend of Eliot's, Sacheverell Sitwell, Eliot had noticed Haigh-Wood earlier, punting on the River Cherwell. Seymour-Jones writes that Oxford attracted young women visitors, or "river girls", who would come in search of eligible husbands; women were not allowed to take degrees at Oxford until 1920.

Lyndall Gordon writes that Eliot was jolted to life by Haigh-Wood. He was a repressed, shy, 26-year-old who was bored in Oxford, writing of it that it was very pretty, "but I don't like to be dead." She was flamboyant, a great dancer, spoke her mind, smoked in public, dressed in bold colours and looked like an actress. Impressed by her apparently wealthy background, the artist father and the brother at Sandhurst, he failed to realise that, within the rigid English class system, Haigh-Wood was no match for his background or for the English aristocrats with whom he had surrounded himself. A few of his friends, including Aldous Huxley, said they liked Haigh-Wood precisely because she was vulgar. For her part, she fell in love with Eliot, seeing in him what she described as "the call to the wild that is in men."

=== Marriage ===
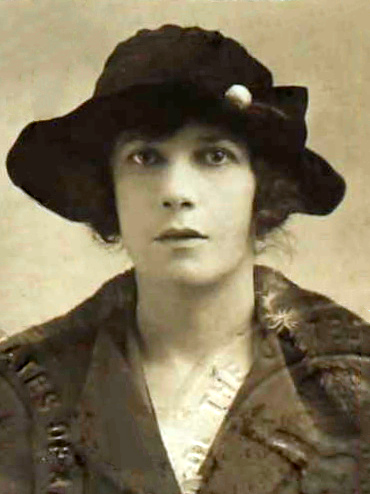
Photograph from Haigh-Wood's American passport, 1920

Eliot was in Oxford for one year only, and was expected to return to Harvard to begin a career as an academic philosopher, an idea he railed against. He wanted to be a poet. He had completed The Love Song of J. Alfred Prufrock in 1911, the poem that was to make his name when it was published in Chicago in 1915, and he saw remaining in England as a way to escape his parents' plans for him.

When he was in his 60s, Eliot wrote that he had been immature and timid at the time, and probably in love with Emily Hale, a Bostonian he had had a relationship with in the United States. What he wanted from Haigh-Wood, he said, was a flirtation. But a meeting with the American poet Ezra Pound had persuaded him that the pursuit of poetry was possible, and marrying Haigh-Wood meant he could stay in England and avoid Harvard. Eliot told a friend, Conrad Aiken, that he wanted to marry and lose his virginity.

The couple were married after three months, on 26 June 1915, at Hampstead Register Office in London, with Lucy Ely Thayer (Scofield's sister) and Haigh-Wood's aunt, Lillia C. Symes, as witnesses. Eliot signed "no occupation" on the certificate and described his father as a brick manufacturer. Neither of them told their parents.

=== Separation ===
Eliot arranged for a formal separation in February 1933.

The last time she saw him was on 18 November 1935 at a Sunday Times Book Fair in Regent Street, London, where he was giving a talk. Carrying three of his books – and her dog, Polly – she arrived in clothes she had taken to wearing to performances of his plays: a British Union of Fascists uniform, black beret and black cape. She wrote in her diary:

I turned a face to him of such joy that no-one in that great crowd could have had one moment's doubt. I just said, Oh Tom, & he seized my hand, & said how do you do, in quite a loud voice. He walked straight on to the platform then & gave a most remarkably clever, well thought out lecture. ... I stood the whole time, holding Polly up high in my arms. Polly was very excited & wild. I kept my eyes on Tom's face the whole time, & I kept nodding my head at him, & making encouraging signs. He looked a little older, more mature & smart, much thinner & not well or robust or rumbustious at all. No sign of a woman's care about him. No cosy evenings with dogs and gramophones I should say.

As he signed copies of the books for her, she asked him, "Will you come back with me?" and he replied, "I cannot talk to you now," then left with someone else.

=== Commitment ===
Vivienne was committed to the Northumberland House mental hospital in Woodberry Down, Manor House, London, in 1938, and remained there until she died. Although Eliot was still legally her husband, he never visited her.

=== Eliot's attitude toward women ===
Whispers of Immortality

Grishkin is nice: her Russian eye
Is underlined for emphasis;
Uncorseted, her friendly bust
Gives promise of pneumatic bliss. ...

The sleek Brazilian jaguar
Does not in its arboreal gloom
Distil so rank a feline smell
As Grishkin in a drawing-room.

— T. S. Eliot, 1919

Carole Seymour-Jones, one of Haigh-Wood's biographers, argues that there was a strong streak of misogyny in the way Eliot regarded Haigh-Wood. He wrote to a friend that Haigh-Wood had "an original mind, and I consider not at all a feminine one."

Louis Menand argues in The New Yorker that Eliot regarded women the way he regarded Jews, seeing both as responsible for irrationality and romanticism. He was uneasy with female sexuality – which led Seymour-Jones to suspect he was homosexual – which manifested itself both in his poetry and in his attitude toward Haigh-Wood's body. Menand writes that Eliot's work is replete with oversexed women, whom he saw as modern succubi, such as Grishkin in his "Whispers of Immortality" (1919).

=== Legacy ===
Carole Seymour-Jones writes that it was out of the turmoil of the marriage that Eliot produced The Waste Land, one of the 20th century's finest poems. Eliot's sister-in-law, Theresa, said of the relationship: "Vivienne ruined Tom as a man, but she made him as a poet."

Valerie Eliot, the poet's second wife (from 1957) claimed the copyright of Haigh-Wood's writings in 1984, including her private diaries, which has complicated the research into her role in Eliot's life.

== Writing ==
Haigh-Wood wrote several stories and reviews for The Criterion, the literary magazine Eliot founded, using the pseudonyms FM, Fanny Marlow, Feiron Morris, Felise Morrison, and Irene Fassett.

== See also ==
- Tom & Viv (1994 film)
- Tom & Viv (1984 play)
- Goodnight, Vivienne, Goodnight, a novel (2022) by Steven Carroll presents an alternative life for Vivienne after she is institutionalised

== Bibliography ==
- Artnet. Charles Heigh-Wood, accessed 9 November 2009.
- Eliot, Valerie and Haughton, Hugh (eds.). The Letters of T.S. Eliot, Volume 1, 1898–1922, Faber and Faber, 2009.
- Gordon, Lyndall (1998). T.S. Eliot. An Imperfect Life, W. W. Norton & Company.
- Gordon, Lyndall (2009). "Eliot, Vivienne Haigh," Oxford Dictionary of National Biography.
- Menand, Louis (2002). "The women come and go", The New Yorker, 30 September 2002.
- Miller, James Edwin (2005). T.S. Eliot: the making of an American poet, 1888–1922, Penn State Press.
- Seymour-Jones, Carole (2001). Painted Shadow, Doubleday.
- Seymour-Jones, Carole (14 October 2001). "Tom and Viv ... and Bertie", The Observer.
- Woolf, Virginia (1981). The Diary of Virginia Woolf, Vol 3, 1925–1930, Harvest Books.
