= The Libertine (album) =

- photograph by Michael Nyman design by Russell Mills and Michael Webster

Soundtrack album by Michael Nyman
- Released: 29 November 2005; 24 June 2008 (USA: reissue)
- Recorded: August 2004, March 2005
- Studio: Angel Recording Studios (London); Olympic Studios (London)
- Genre: Soundtrack, Contemporary classical music, Minimalist music
- Length: 48:05
- Language: English
- Label: MN Records
- Producer: Michael Nyman

Michael Nyman chronology
The Piano Sings (2005)	The Libertine (2005)	The Composer's Cut Series Vol. I: The Draughtsman's Contract (2005)

The Libertine: Music for the Film by Laurence Dunmore is the album release of Michael Nyman's score for the 2004 film The Libertine directed by Laurence Dunmore. It is the third release on Nyman's own label, MN Records, and the first to receive distribution in the United States, by Inner Knot Records. It is his 50th album release overall. When Naxos Records began distributing MN Records in the United States in 2008, it was included and began appearing in large quantities in stores. This is Nyman's last score for a major motion picture to date, and his last soundtrack release, other than compilation soundtracks.

The score includes the song "If" (as "Rochester's farewell", with partially changed lyrics, removal of the quotes from "Time Lapse" from A Zed & Two Noughts, and the addition of a setting of the Kyrie) performed by Hilary Summers, who originally performed it in the film, The Diary of Anne Frank (1995). It also includes an abridgement by Jeffreys of one of Wilmot's most famous poems, "Signior Dildo", also sung by Ms. Summers. A recurring theme on the album which first appears in "Upon drinking in a bowl" for solo viola, became the basis of the Interlude in C for Accent007 ensemble. "The maimed debauchee" is a fairly brief piece, but resembles the Interlude at its climax. The theme reappears in a longer version as "Against constancy".

The album primarily follows the order of the film, but there are exceptions, including "My Lord all-pride", which immediately follows "Signior Dildo" in the film, as Wilmot steps out from curtains painted to resemble female genitalia.

Portions of the score appear in all-brass arrangements on the album, Nyman Brass.

== Track listing ==
1. "History of the insipid"
2. "Upon drinking in a bowl"
3. "Impromptu on an English court"
4. "Upon nothing"
5. "The maimed debauchee"
6. "The wish"
7. "The submission"
8. "A ramble in St. James's Park"
9. "The mistress"
10. "Signior dildo"
11. "Against constancy"
12. "My Lord all-pride"
13. "The imperfect enjoyment"
14. "A satire against reason"
15. "Rochester's farewell"
16. "A satire upon mankind"
17. "Upon leaving his mistress"

== Personnel ==
- Michael Nyman Orchestra
  - Gaby Lester, violin (leader)
  - Cathy Thompson, violin (leader)
  - Thomas Bowes, violin
  - Bev Davison, violin
  - Manon Derome, violin
  - Clive Dobbins, violin
  - Jonathan Evans-Jones, violin
  - Rebecca Hirsch, violin
  - Philippa Ibbotson, violin
  - Helen Paterson, violin
  - Debbie Widdup, violin
  - Kate Musker, viola
  - Jonathan Barritt, viola
  - James Boyd, viola
  - Richard Cookson, viola
  - John Metcalfe, viola
  - Bruce White, viola
  - Tony Hinnigan, cello
  - Nick Cooper, cello
  - Sophie Harris, cello
  - William Scholfield, cello
  - Linda Houghton, double bass
  - Martin Elliott, bass guitar
  - David Roach, soprano, alto sax
  - Simon Haram, soprano, alto sax
  - Jamie Talbot, soprano, tenor sax
  - Andy Findon, baritone sax, flute, piccolo
  - Steve Sidwell, trumpet
  - David Lee, horn
  - Nigel Barr, bass trombone
  - Martin Allen, percussion
  - Michael Nyman, piano
- Hilary Summers, contralto
- Capital Voices
- Music composed, conducted, and produced by Michael Nyman
- Assistant to the composer: Andrew Keenan
- Recorded, mixed, and edited by Austin Ince
- Assistant Engineers: Mat Bartram and Roland Heap
- Orchestra contractor: Isobel Griffiths
- Published by Boosey and Hawkes Music Publishers/Michael Nyman Ltd. 2005, except Track 15, music by Michael Nyman, text by Stephen Jeffreys Published by Chester Music Ltd./Michael Nyman Ltd. 2005
- Special thanks to Annette Gentz, Elizabeth Lloyd, Rachel Thomas, Polly Hope, Andrew Thompson, James Ware, Declan Colgan and especially Laurnce Dunmore
- Design by Russell Mills (shed)
- Co-design by Michael Webster (storm)
- Photography by Michael Nyman
