= The Libertine =

The Libertine may refer to:

- The Libertine (1968 film), directed by Pasquale Festa Campanile
- The Libertine (2000 film), a French film starring Vincent Pérez and Fanny Ardant
- The Libertine (2005 film), starring Johnny Depp, John Malkovich, Samantha Morton, and Rosamund Pike
- "The Libertine" (song), a song by Patrick Wolf
- The Libertines, a British rock band
  - The Libertines (album), a 2004 album by The Libertines
- The Libertine (album), by Michael Nyman for the 2004 film
- The Libertine (book), an 1807 English novel by Charlotte Dacre
- The Libertine (play), a 1676 play by Thomas Shadwell
- The Libertine, a 1994 play by Stephen Jeffreys

== See also ==
- Libertine (disambiguation)
