= Libertine (disambiguation) =

A libertine is one free from the restraint of social norms and religious morals.

Libertine may also refer to:

- Synagogue of the Libertines
- Ragusian libertine, a silver coin used in the Republic of Ragusa (modern-day Dubrovnik, Croatia)
- Linux Libertine, a free software Unicode typeface by the Libertine Open Fonts Project
- Libertine (magazine), the student magazine of Flinders University, South Australia
- Libertine, an American fashion label run by Johnson Hartig
- "Libertine" (song), a 1986 song by Mylène Farmer
- Libertine (Gene album), 2001
- Libertine (Silkworm album), 1994
- Libertine (Liv Kristine album), 2012
- "Libertine", a song by The Buck Pets on their album Mercurotones

== People ==
- Eve Libertine (born 1949), stage name of Bronwyn Lloyd Jones, a lead vocalist of the anarcho-punk band Crass
- Saint Libertine (Libertinus, Libertino), Christian bishop of Agrigento, Sicily

== See also ==
- The Libertine (disambiguation)
- Libertine novel, an 18th-century literary genre associated with libertines
- The Libertines, an English indie/rock band
  - The Libertines (album), the second album produced by the band
- I, Libertine, a novel, a literary hoax that was made real
