= The Piano Sings =

- photograph by Michael Nyman design by Russell Mills and Michael Webster

Studio album by Michael Nyman
- Released: 2 May 2005 (UK); September 29, 2008 (United States)
- Recorded: 12–14 February 2005
- Genre: Chamber music, contemporary classical, minimalism, film music
- Length: 49:39
- Label: MN Records
- Producer: Declan Colgan

Michael Nyman chronology
Man and Boy: Dada (2005)	The Piano Sings (2005)	The Libertine (2005)

Professional ratings
Review scores
Source	Rating
Music from the Movies	4/4 stars

The Piano Sings is a 2005 solo album by Michael Nyman featuring personal interpretations of film music he wrote between 1993 and 2003. It is his second release on his own label, MN Records, and his 49th release overall. The album was released alongside a concert tour.

Nyman's February 2005 statement about the album printed within the booklet is very brief:

All my music starts out as piano music so the opportunity to get back to that essence appealed to me. Hence my desire to make this album a personal signature as a composer/performer. I have deliberately focused on my more song-like music: the album title suggested itself.

== Track listing ==
1. Diary of Love (The End of the Affair)
2. If (The Diary of Anne Frank)
3. Franklyn (Wonderland)
4. The Morrow (Gattaca)
5. Jack (Wonderland)
6. The Heart Asks Pleasure First (The Piano)
7. Big my Secret (The Piano)
8. Debbie (Wonderland)
9. The Departure (Gattaca)
10. Why (The Diary of Anne Frank)
11. Odessa Beach (Man with a Movie Camera)
12. Lost and Found (The Piano)
13. The Exchange (The Claim)
14. Candlefire (The Diary of Anne Frank)
15. All Imperfect Things (The Piano)
16. Diary of Love [reprise] (The End of the Affair)

== Personnel ==
- Composed and performed by Michael Nyman
- Recorded, mixed and edited by Austin Ince at Whitfield Street Studios, London, 12–14 February 2005
- Assistant engineer: Phil Tyreman
- Produced by Declan Colgan
- Mastered by Peter Mew at Abbey Road Studios, London, 17 February 2005
- All music published by Chester Music Ltd./Michael Nyman Ltd., except 1, 4, 9, 16 published by Colpix Music Ltd., administered by Sony/ATV Songs LLC (BMI)
- Photography by Michael Nyman
- Photograph of Michael Nyman by John Fago
- Design by Russell Mills (shed)
- Co-design by Michael Webster (storm)
- Thanks to Elizabeth Lloyd, Rachel Thomas, Rebecca Duncan at Whitfield Street Studios, Lucy Launder at Abbey Road, Gareth Davies, Laurence Dunmore, Melane Mueller and Andrew Thompson.
- Thanks also to the directors of the respective films: Jane Campion, Neil Jordan, Akinora Nagaoka, Andrew Niccol, Dziga Vertov, Michael Winterbottom and lyricists Hachiro Konno and Roger Pulvers.
