= Alan Kitching (typographic artist) =

English typographer (born 1940)

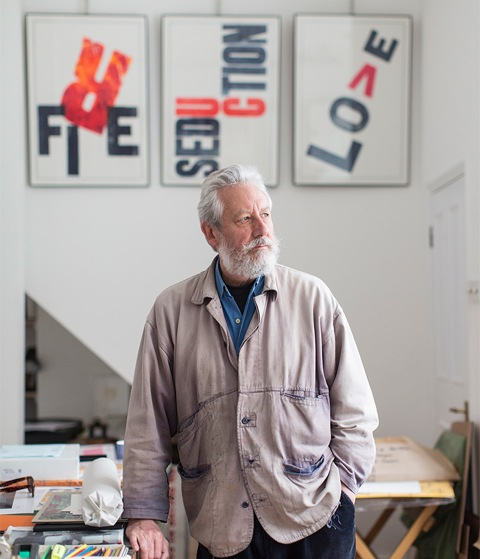
Kitching in 2016

Alan Kitching RDI AGI Hon FRCA (born 1940) is an English typographer, artist and printmaker. Kitching is known for his expressive use of wood and metal letterforms in commissions and limited-edition prints.

== Early life ==
Born 1940 in Darlington, county Durham, Kitching began his career aged 15 as an apprentice compositor at a local jobbing printer J. W. Brown & Son (1956–62) where he learned to set type for catalogues, tickets and posters. From 1962 to 1964 he was a technician in hand and line type composition at the Department of Printing, Watford College of Technology in Herts. After meeting designer Anthony Froshaug, the new head of department, Kitching co-established the experimental printing workshop at Watford College of Technology. He later continued to collaborate with Froshaug on student projects at the Central School of Art & Design. He left Watford in 1970 and moved to London.

== Professional career ==
In 1973 Kitching began his own design practice in London with Pentagram co-founder Colin Forbes. In 1977 he partnered with Derek Birdsall and Martin Lee at Omnific Studios. He began letterpress workshops in 1986 at Omnific's office in Islington, London, and in the late 1980s, at the Royal College of Art. He left Omnific in 1988 and went on to establish The Typography Workshop in Clerkenwell in 1989.

From 1994 Kitching worked in partnership with designer and teacher Celia Stothard FRSA, who later became his wife. In 1999, in partnership with Stothard, Kitching purchased a large collection of theatrical wood types, now named 'Entertaining Types' and housed in Kennington, Lambeth, South London.

Kitching created posters for the National Theatre, The British Library, The Guardian and Royal Mail. His work is renowned due to his expressive use of analog typography, particularly large-scale wood and metal type, and vibrant colours. Kitching produces many of his artworks as limited-edition prints using letterpress technology.

== Selected works ==
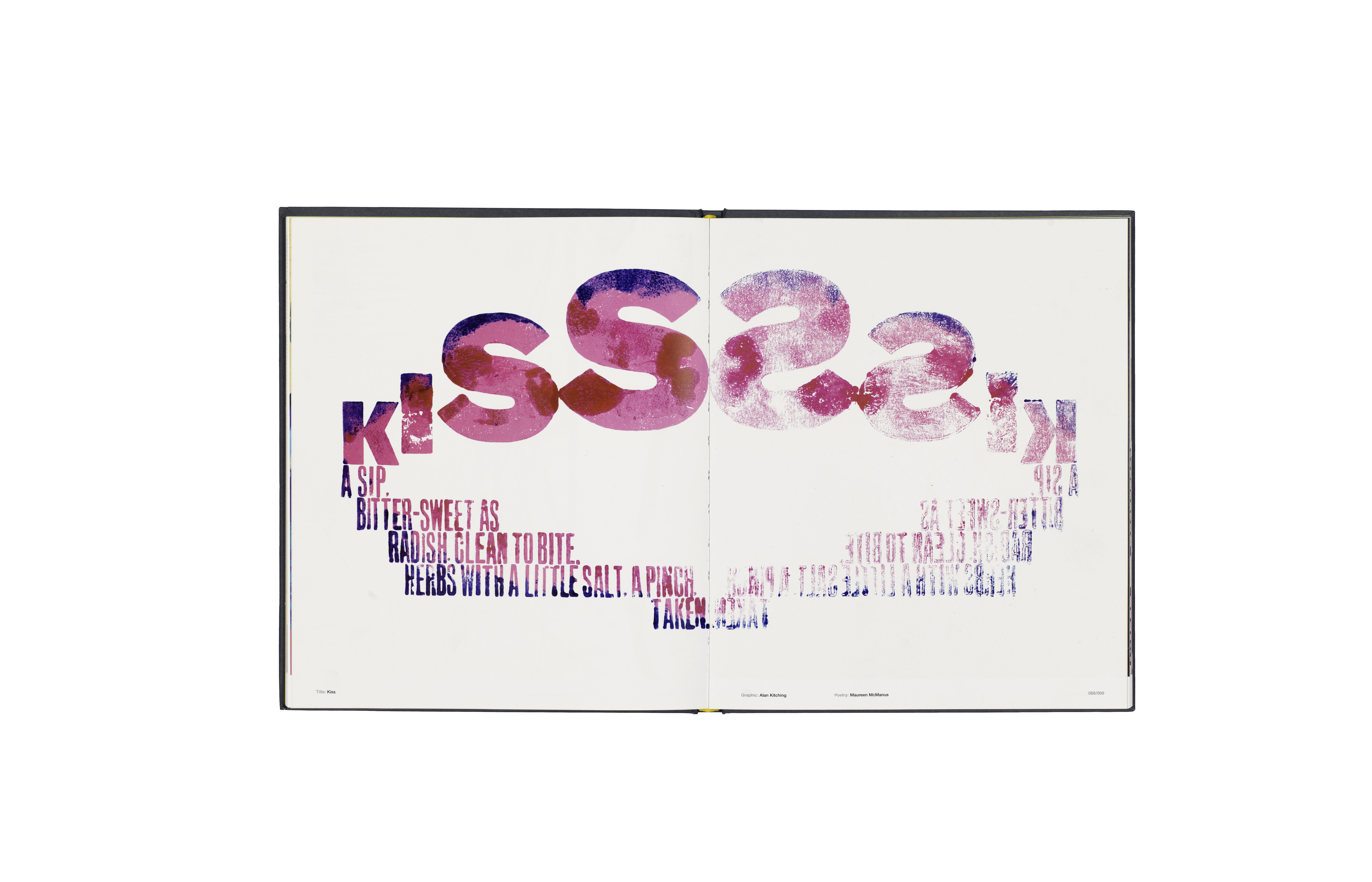
Kiss - Graphic Poetry

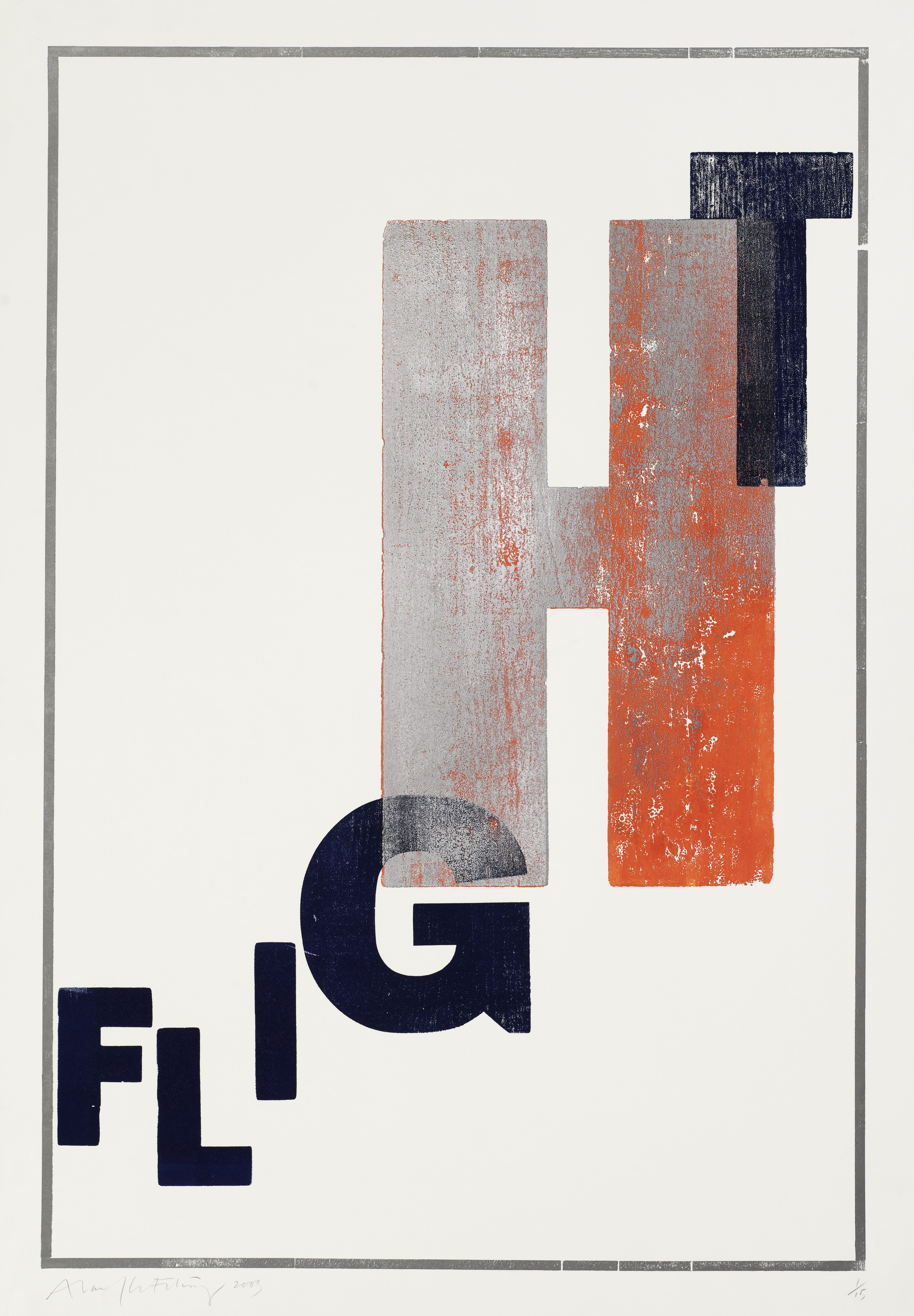
Poster for National Theatre Transformation series.

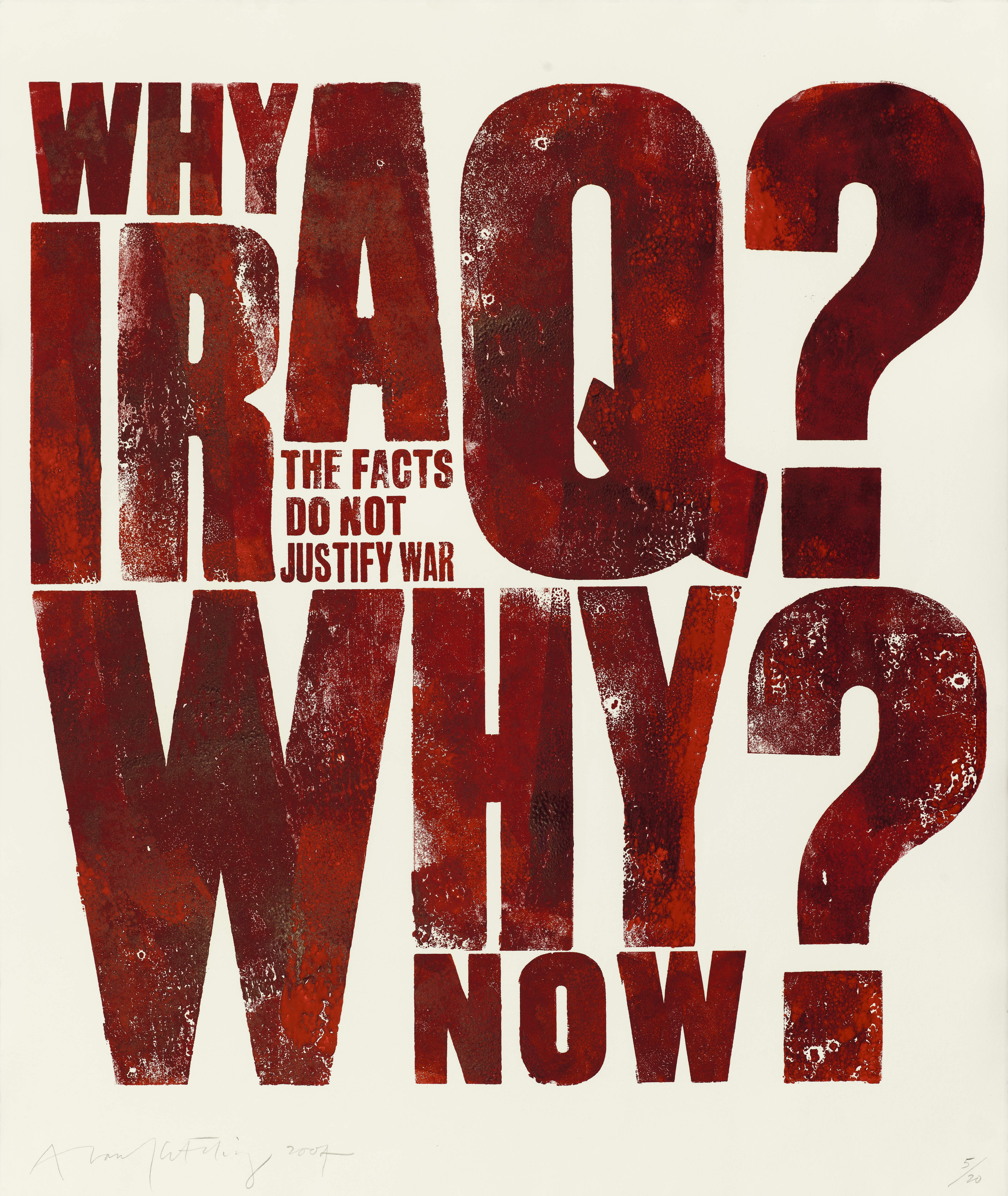
Iraq war demo poster for The Guardian

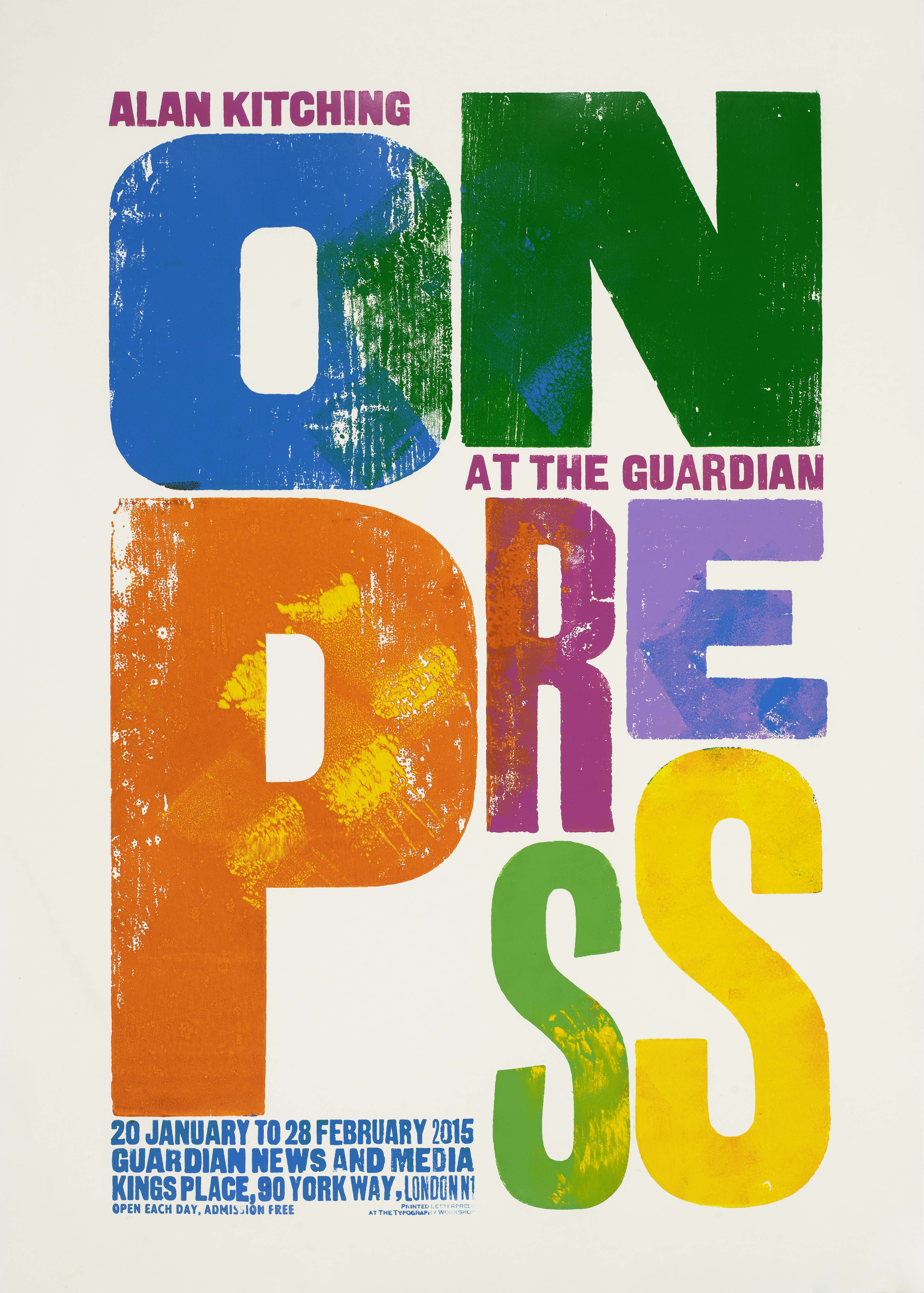
Guardian graphic

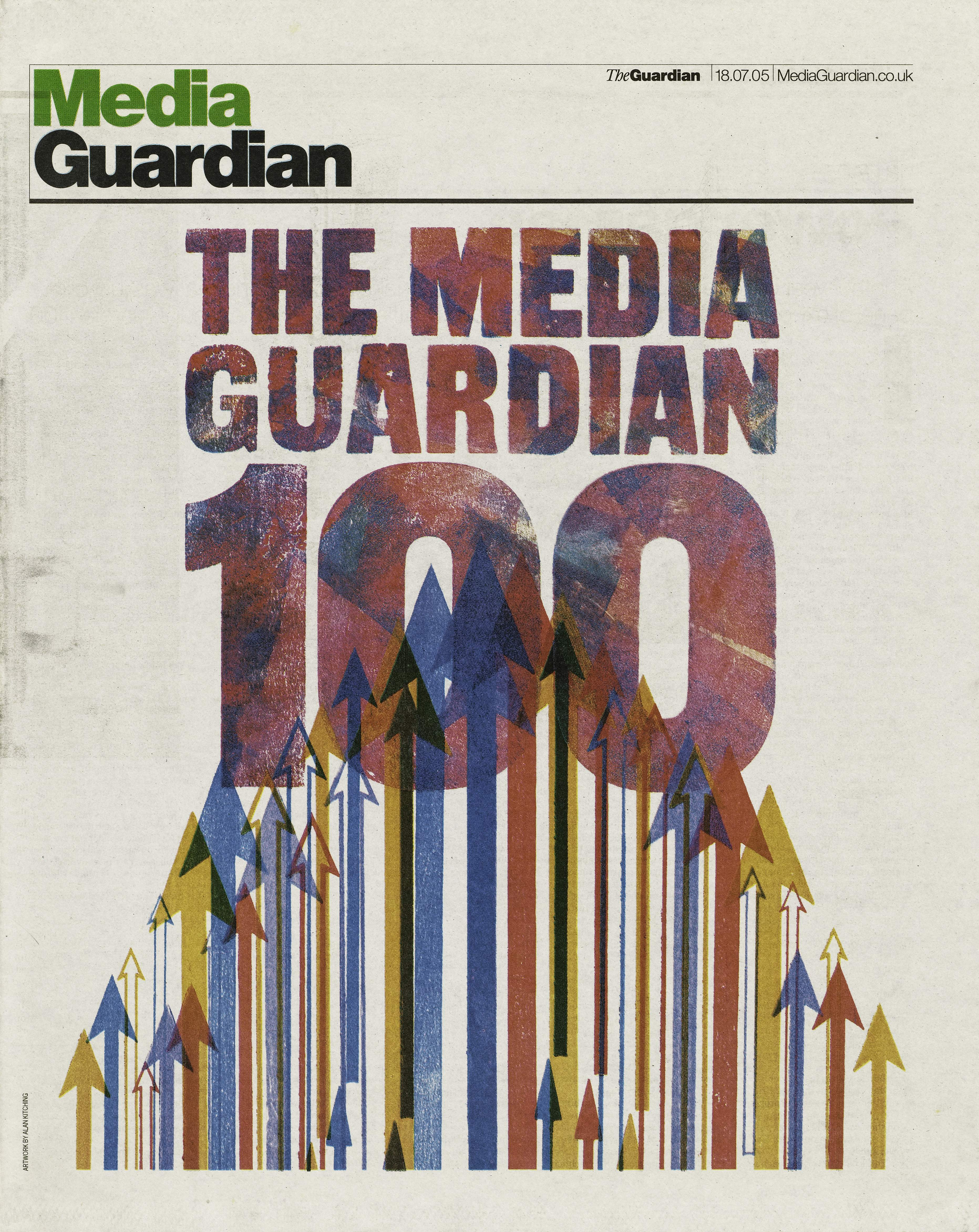
Guardian graphic

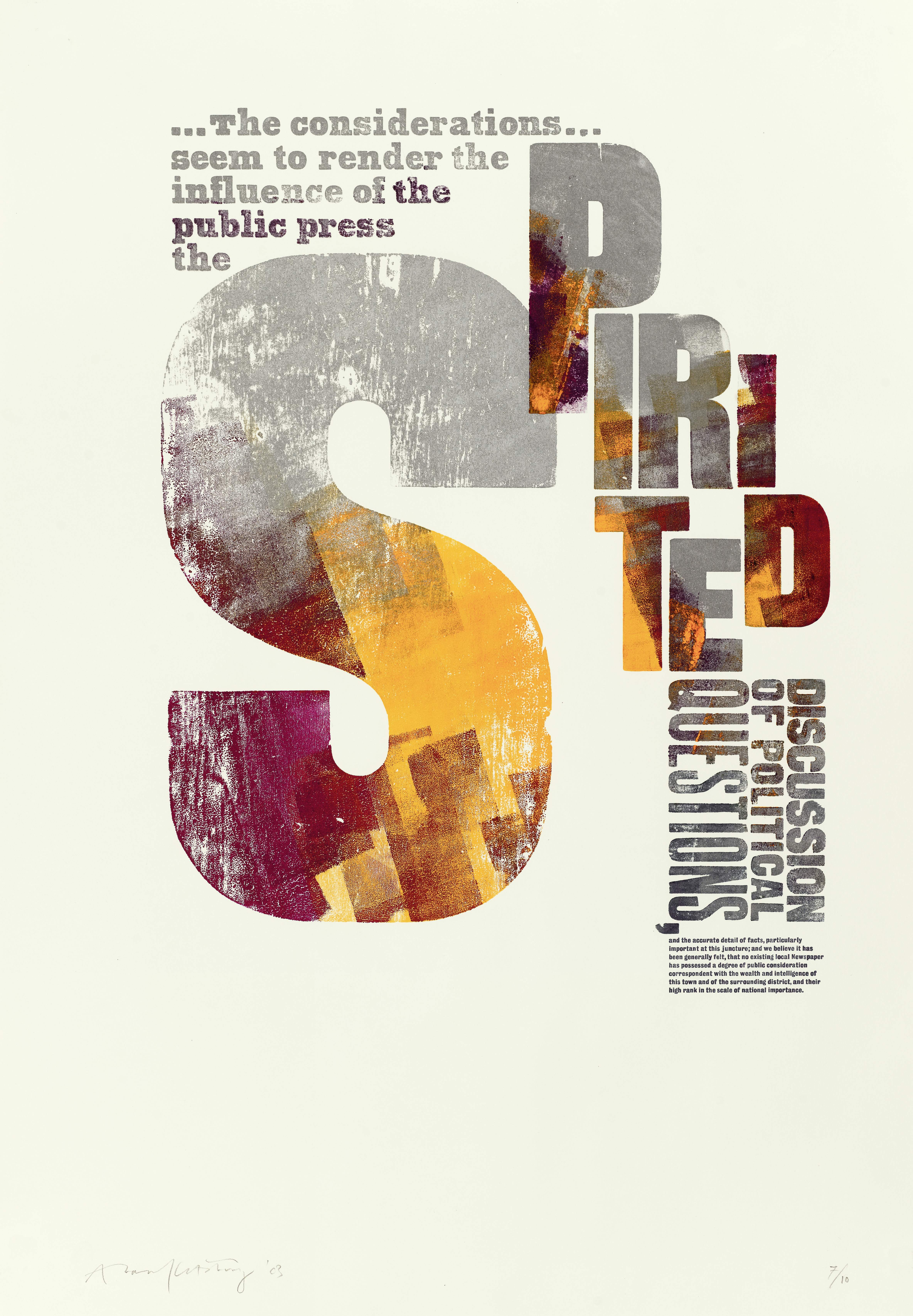
'Spirited' for The Guardian

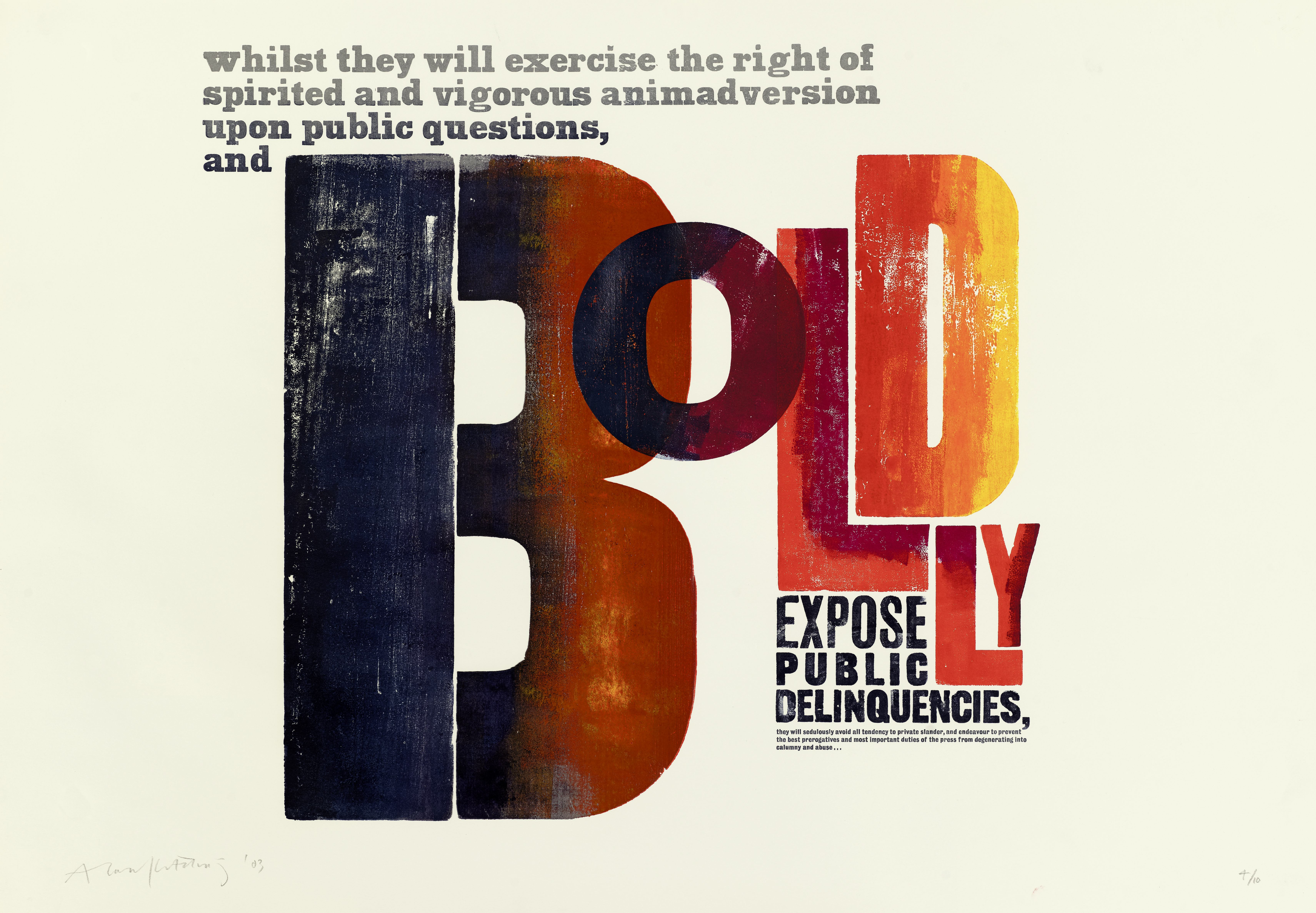
'Boldly' for The Guardian

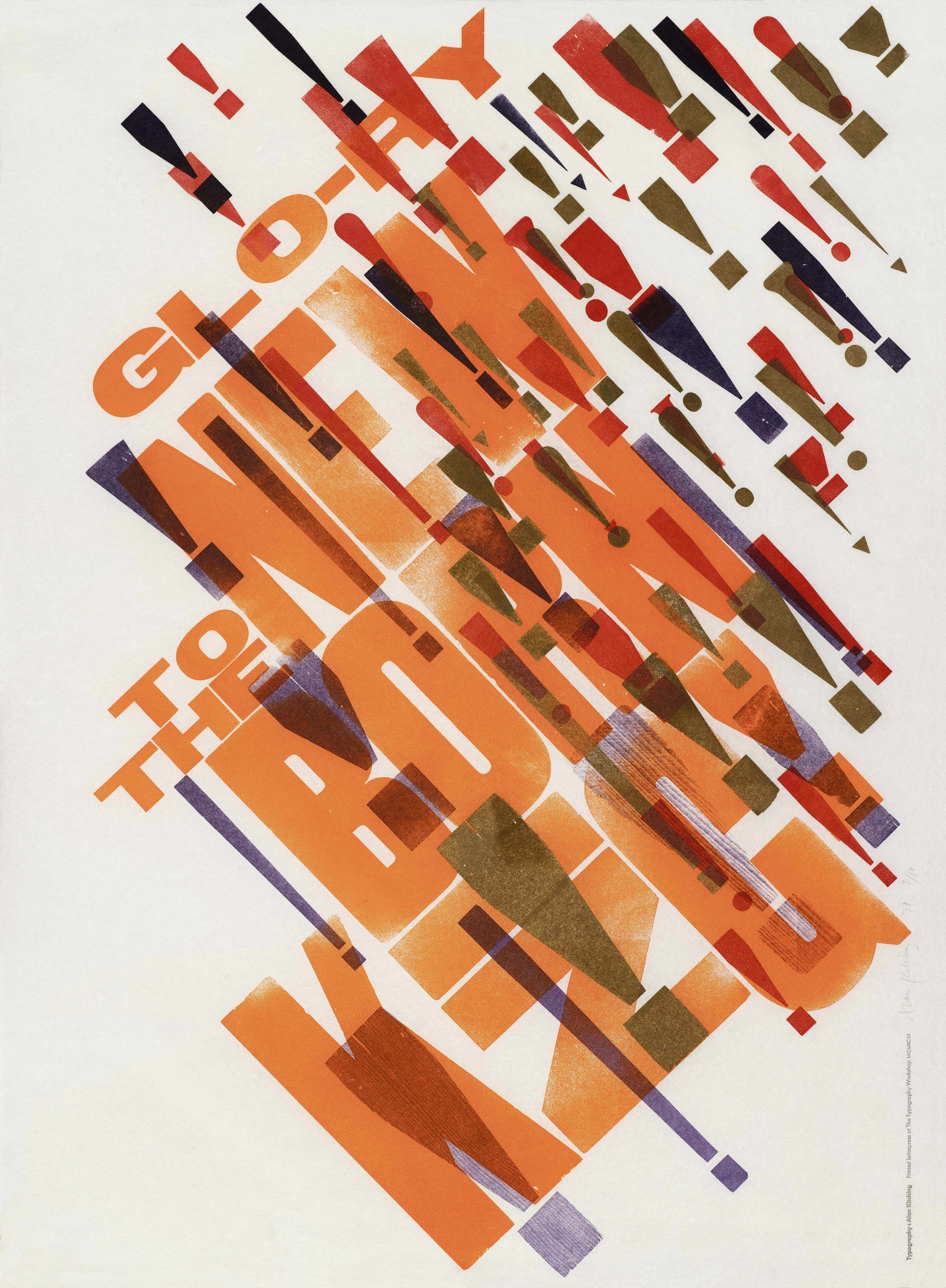
Glory to the New Born King

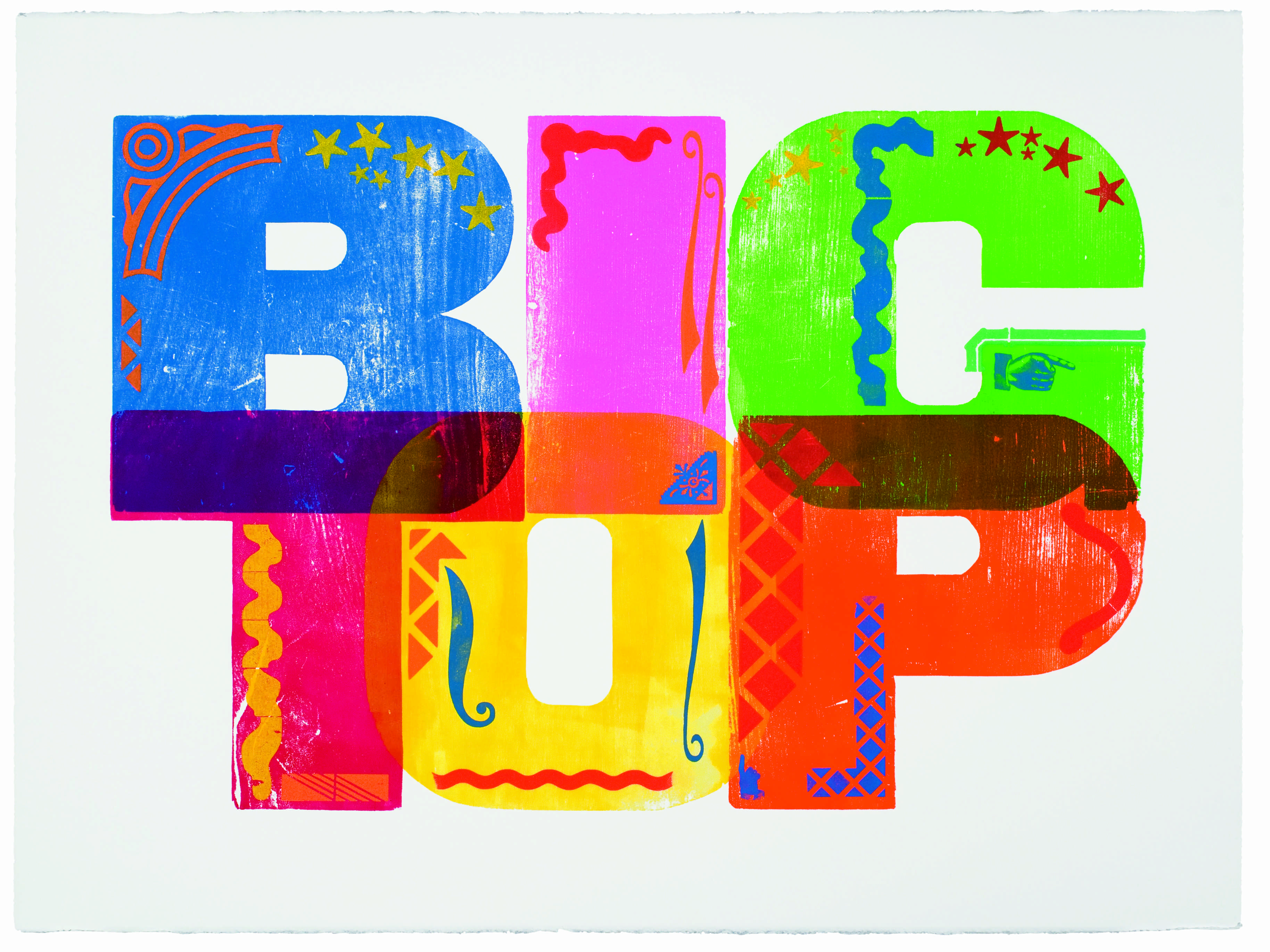
'The Big Top' - The Wrington Suite

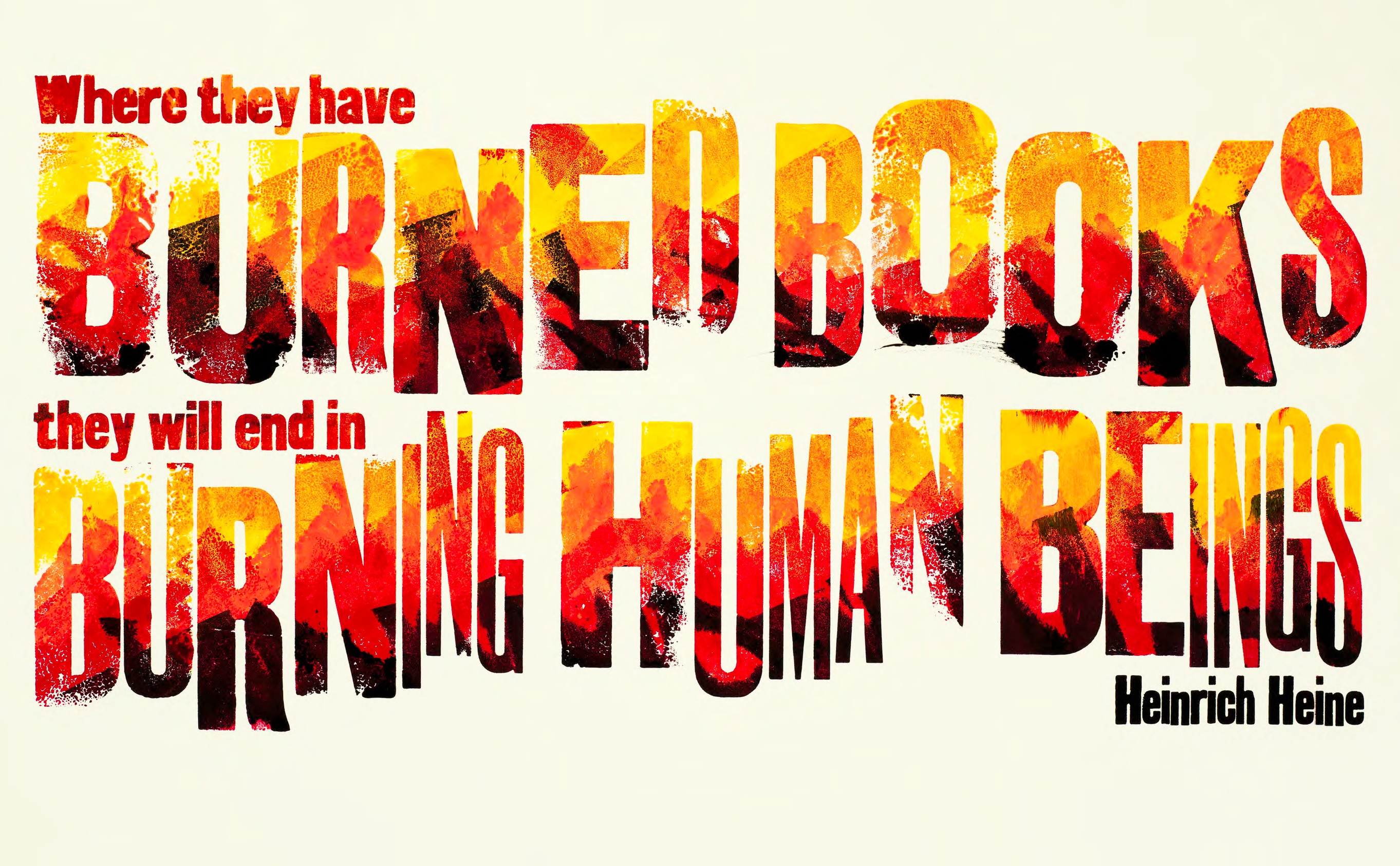
Burning books

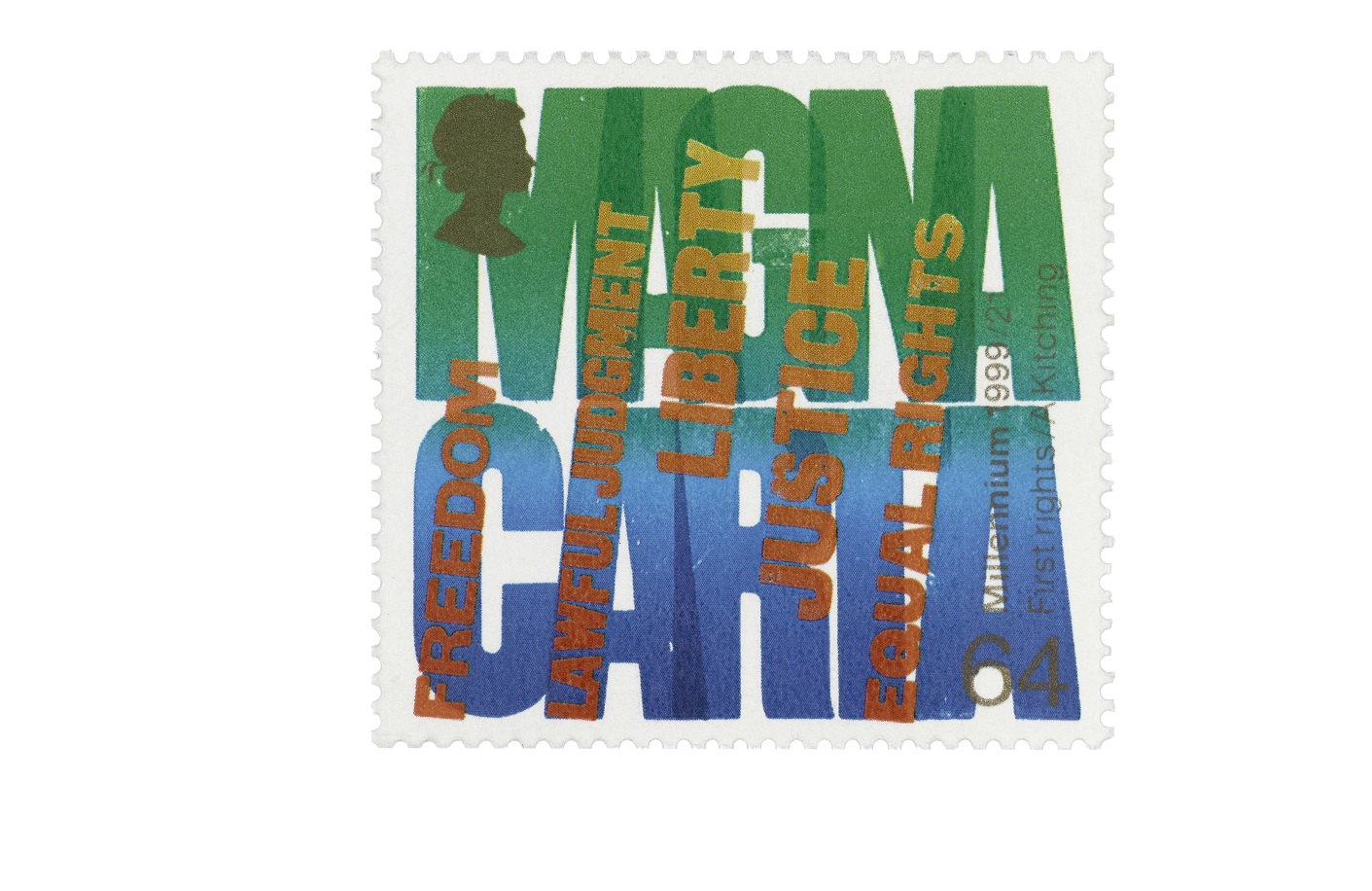
Magna Carta

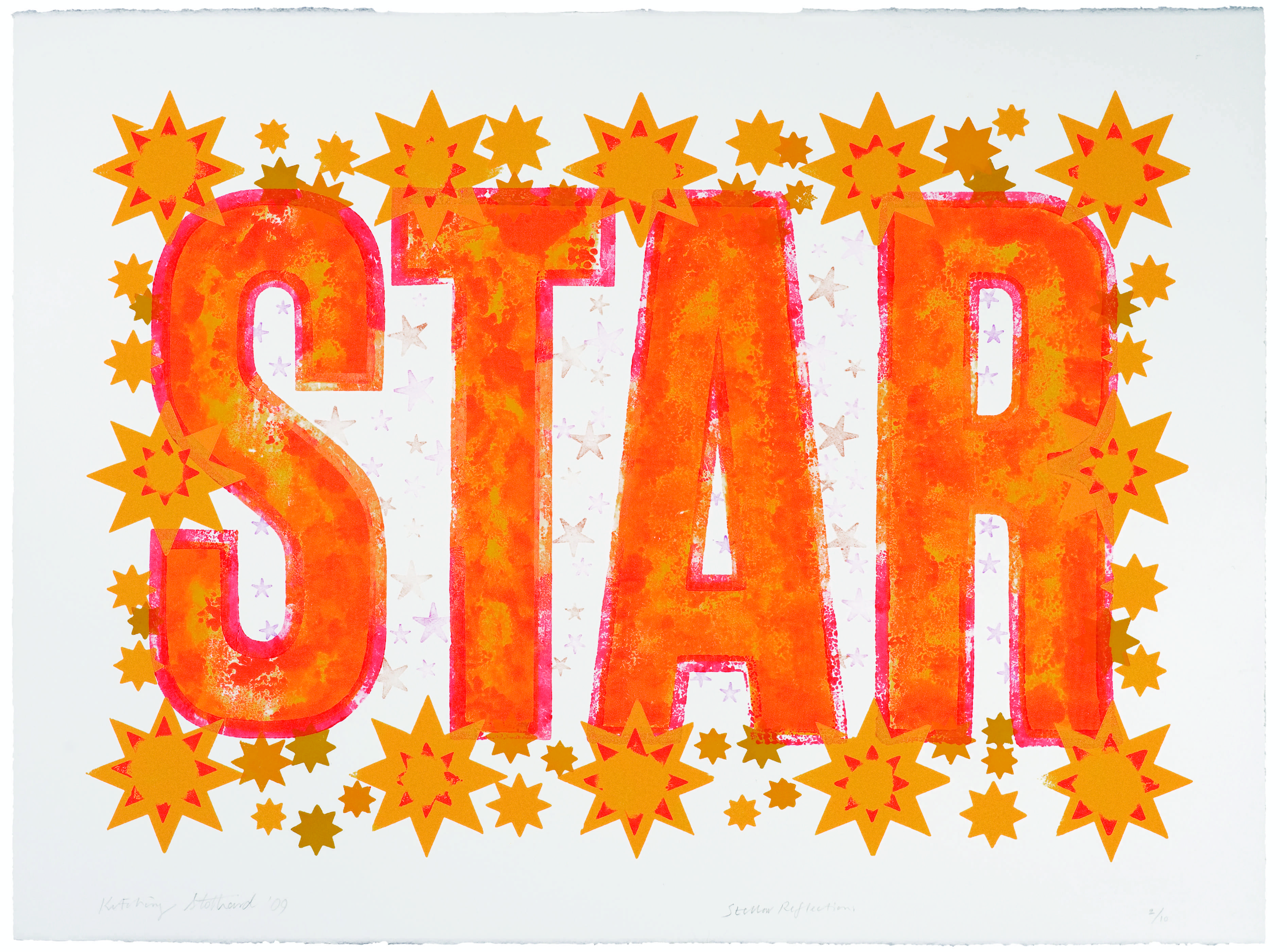
Stellar

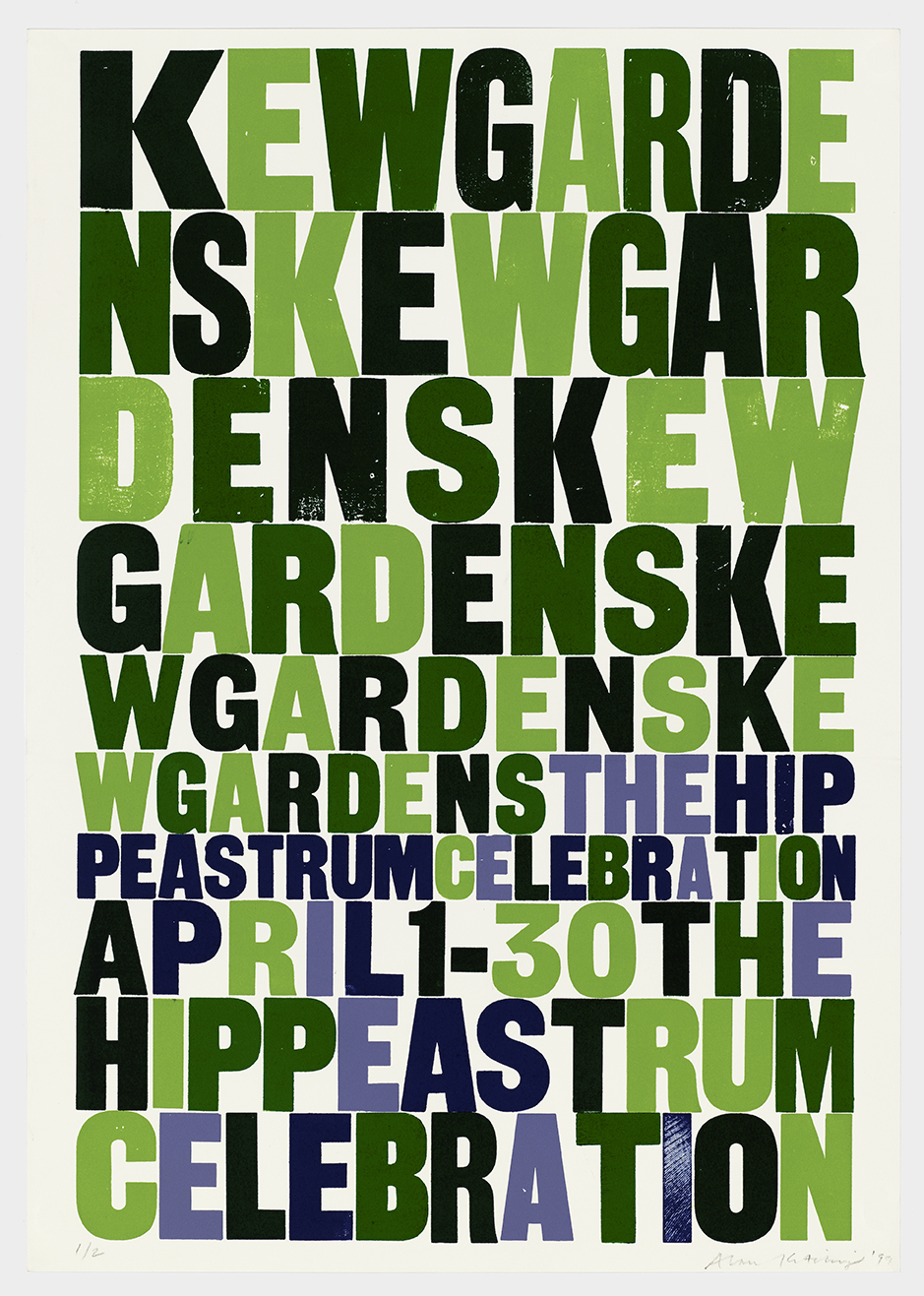
Kew Gardens

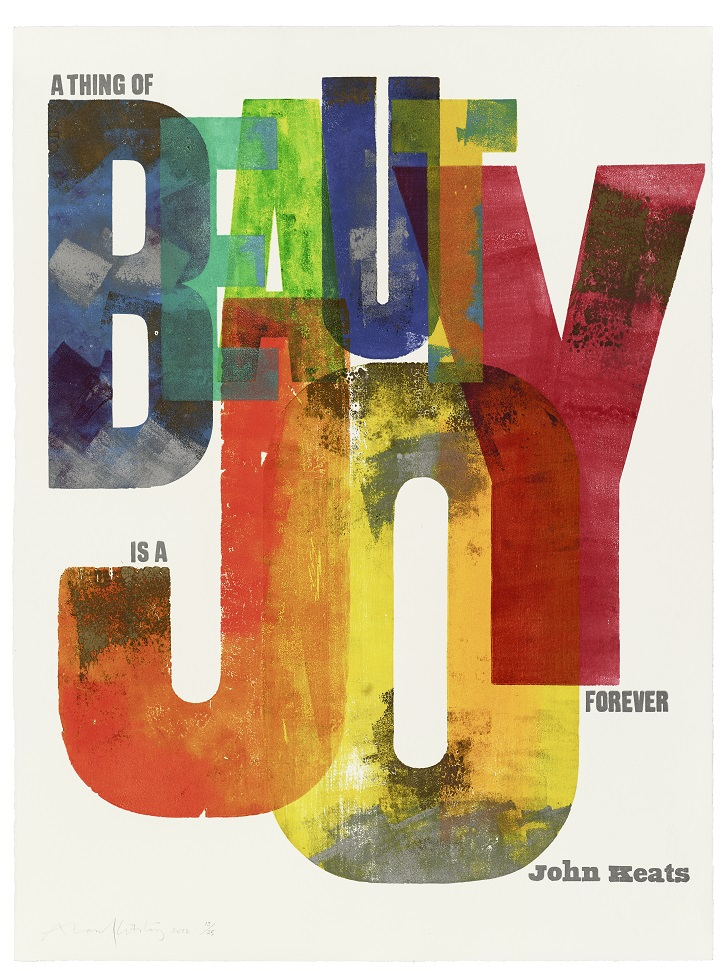
A thing of beauty

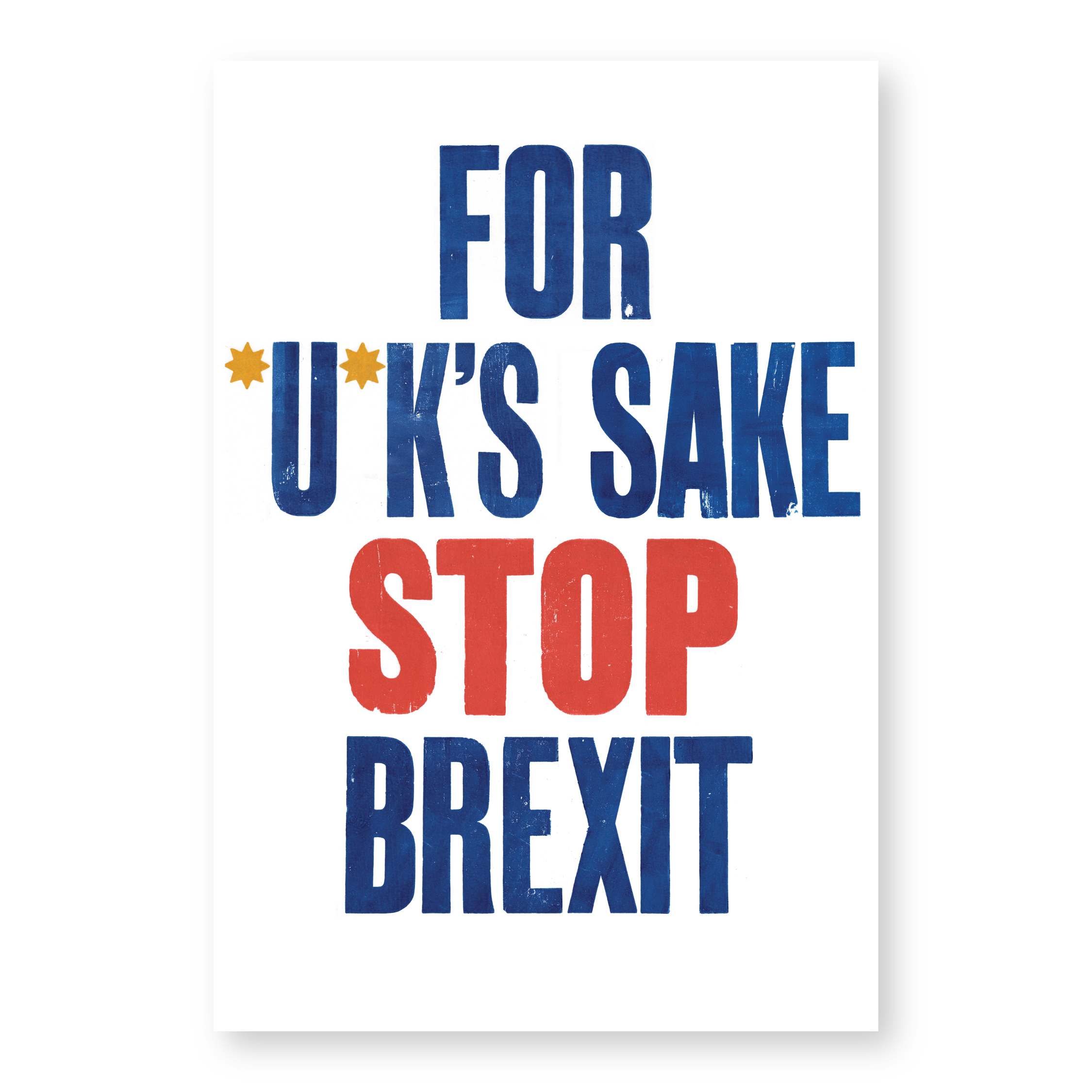
Anti Brexit Poster

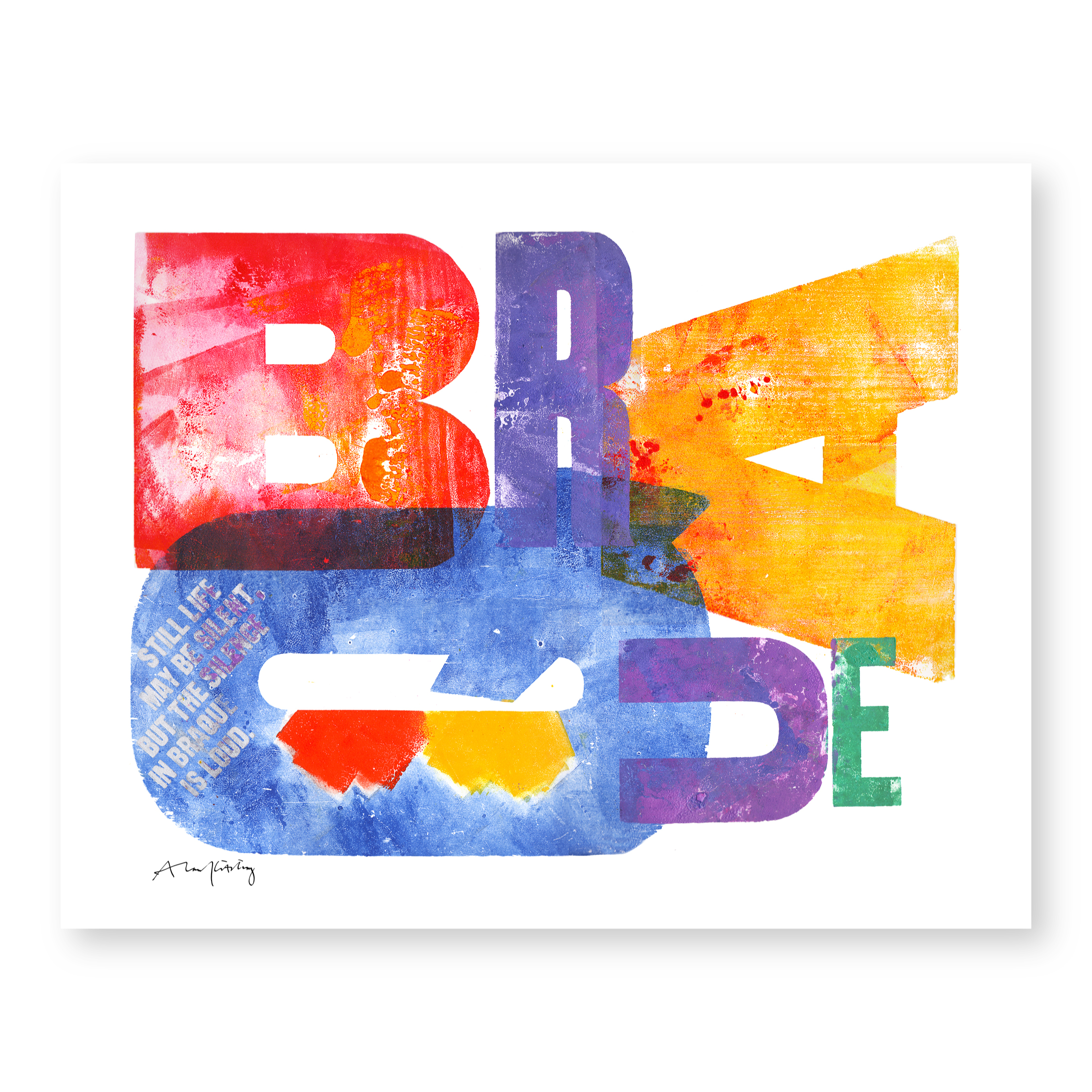
Braque Letterpress

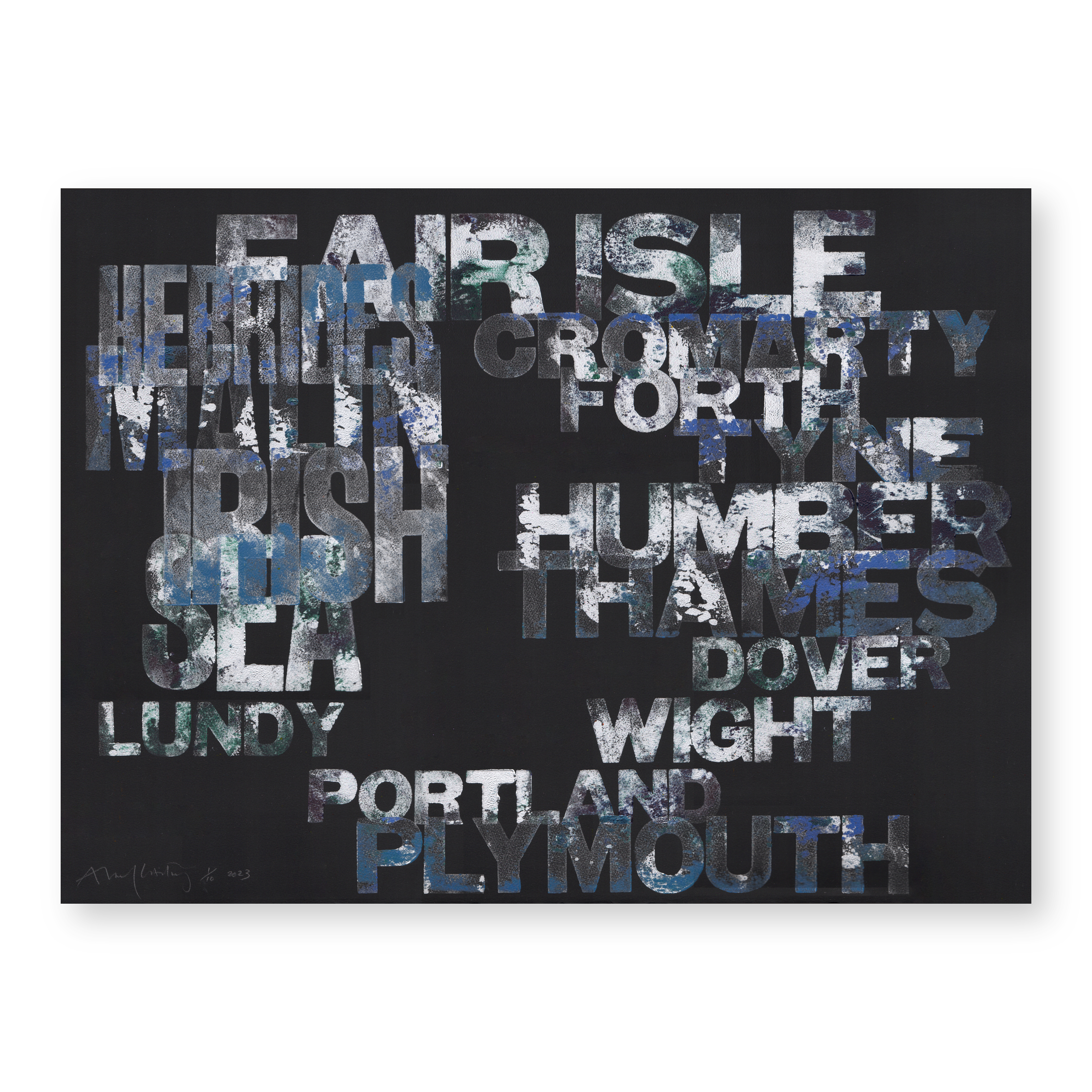
Shipping Forecast

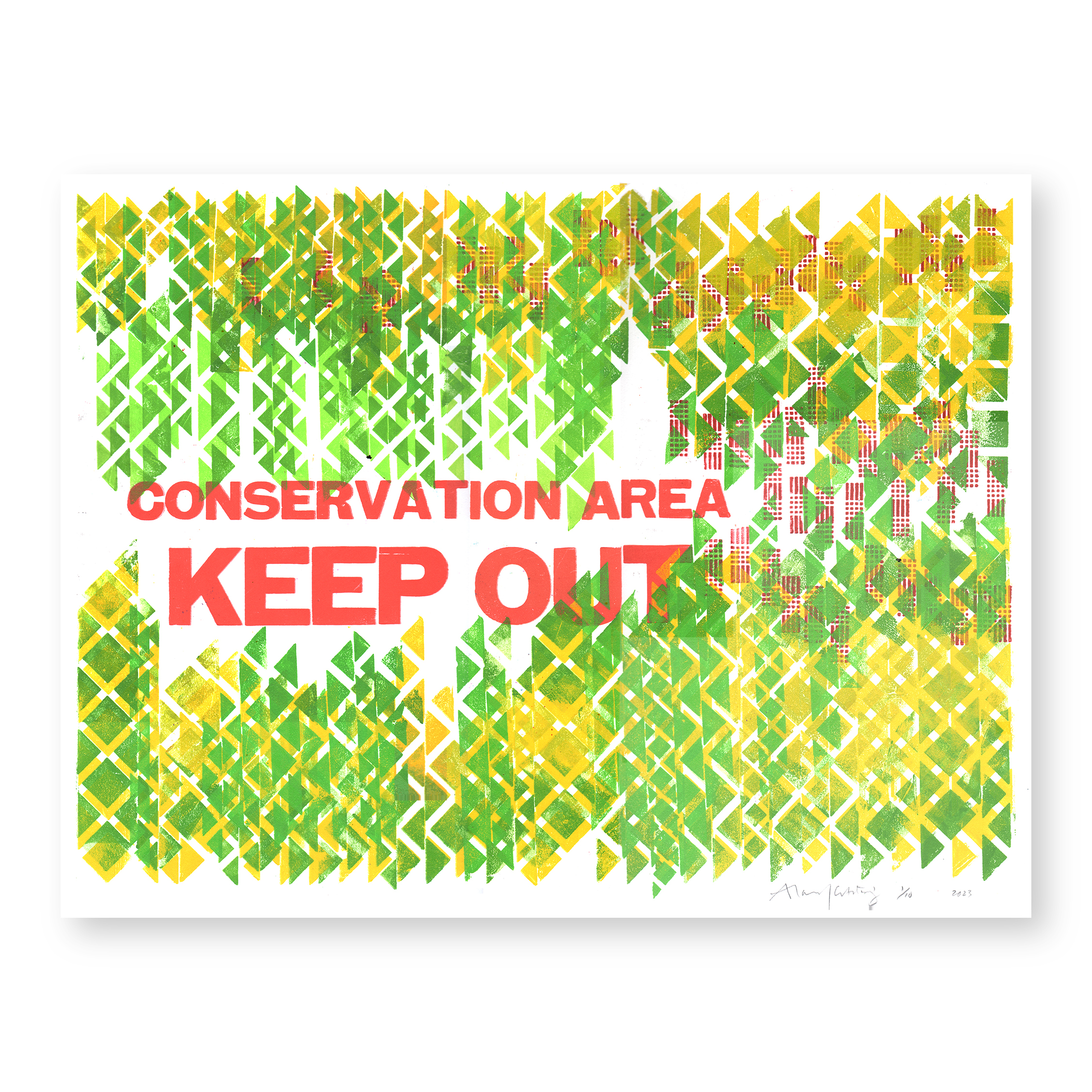
Crimson Clover

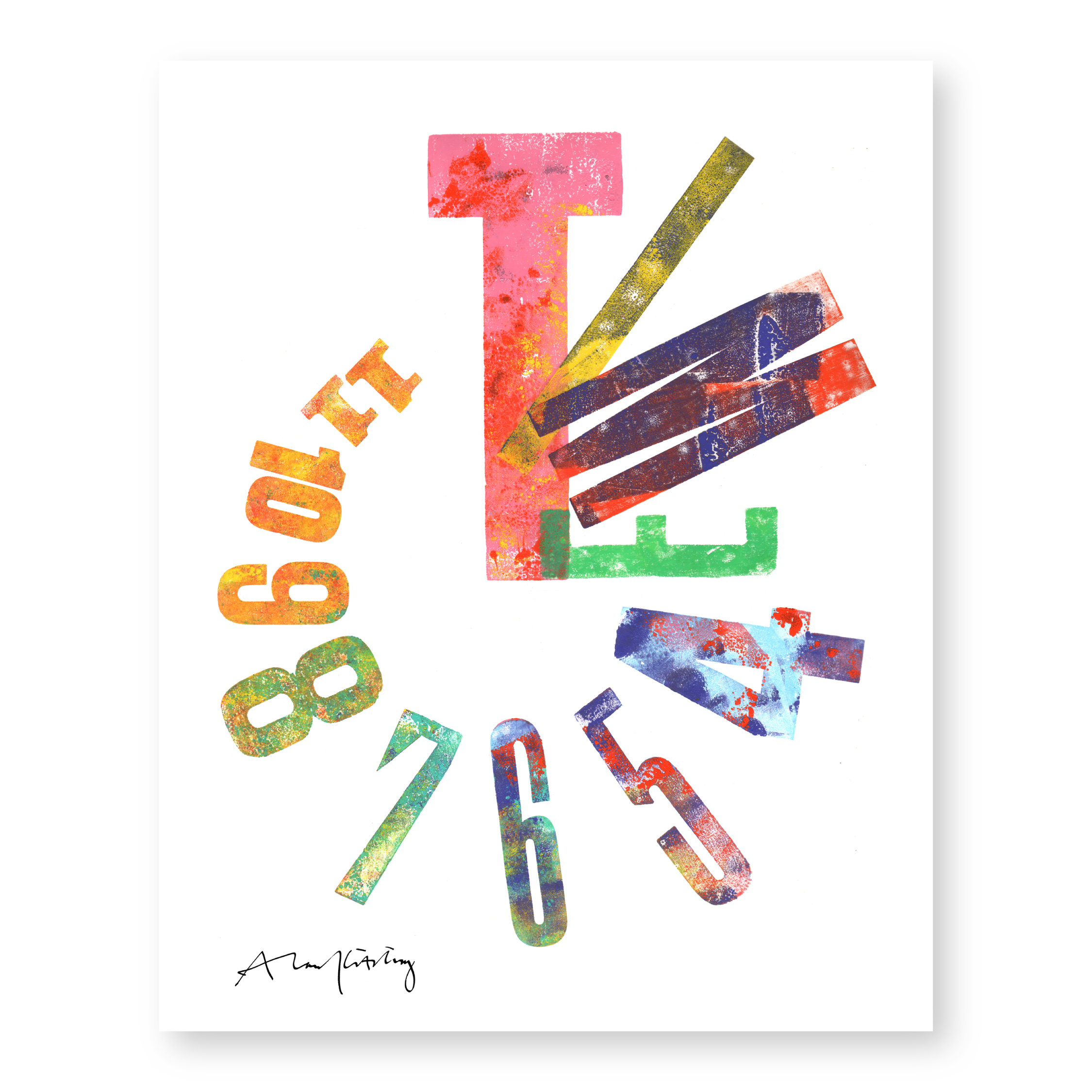
Time for Port

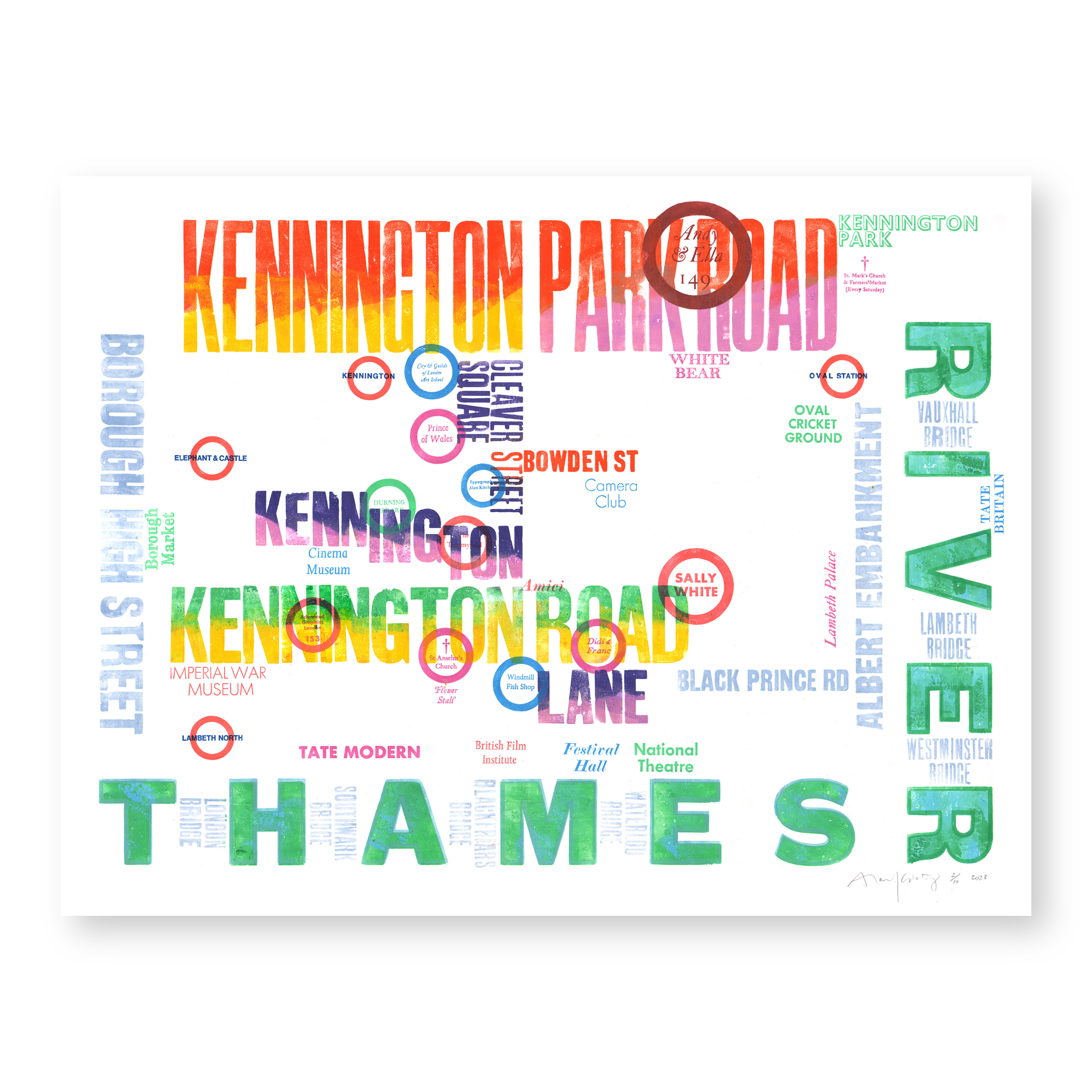
Kennington, London, Map

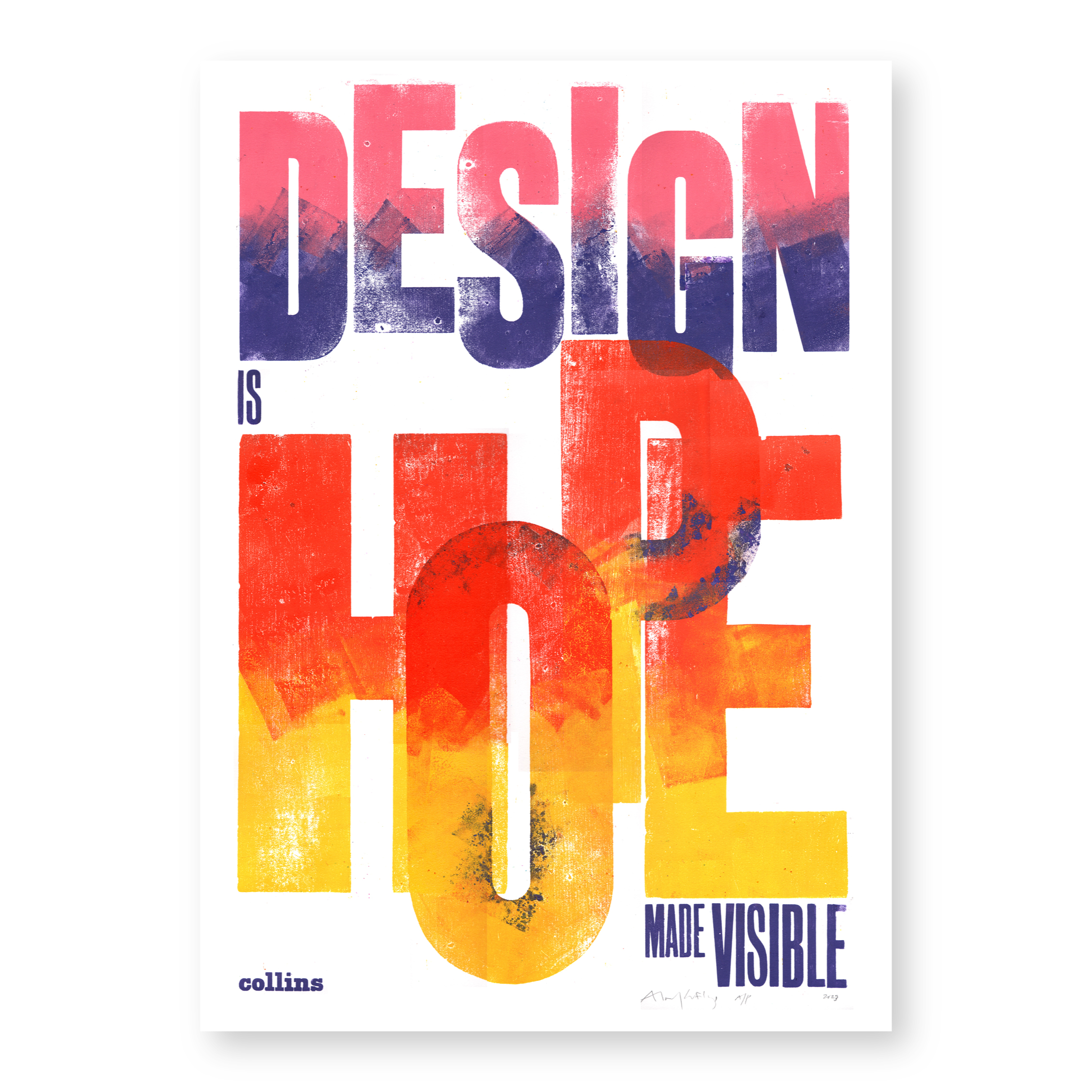
Design is hope

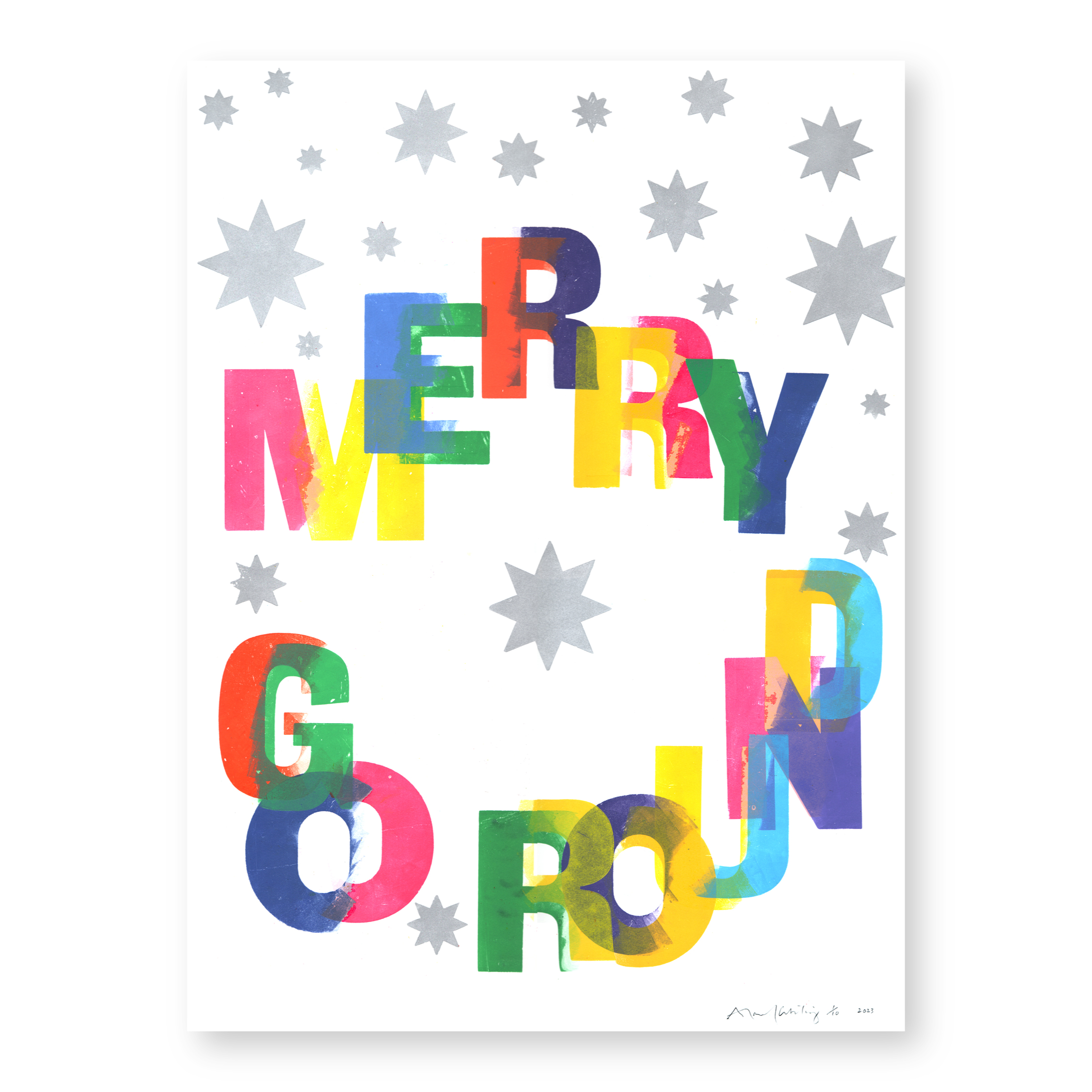
Merry Go round

== Teaching ==
- 1967–70: Part-Time lecturer in Typography, School of Art, Watford College of Technology, Herts.
- 1968–72: Visiting lecturer in Graphic Design, Central School of Art & Design, London.
- 1973: Visiting lecturer, London College of Printing.
- 1974–75: Visiting lecturer, Goldsmiths College, University of London.
- 1988: Visiting lecturer in Graphic Design, Royal College of Art
- 1990–2000: University of Brighton, School of Graphic Design, visiting lecturer.
- 1991–2006: Typography Workshops at Royal College of Art
- 1994: Colchester Institute, School of Art, visiting lecturer.
- 1993–1995: Glasgow School of Art, visiting lecturer.

== Awards and memberships ==
- Designers and Art Directors Association (D and AD)
- 1999: Fellow of Chartered Society of Designers
- 1999: Member of Alliance Graphique Internationale (AGI)
- 1994: Royal Designer for Industry (RDI)
- 1996: Member of the Designers and Art Directors Association (D&AD) 1997: Fellow of Royal Society of Arts
- 1998: Fellow of the Royal College of Art
- 2001: Visiting Professor The London Institute (now University of the Arts London)

== Commissions ==
- 1999: Stamps for Royal Mail: Magna Carta Millennium series
- 2000: Dazed & Confused Magazine – Typographic artwork for magazine cover
- 2000: D&AD – Typographic artwork for Invitation
- 2002: Poems on the buses for Transport for London
- 2002: Posters for the National Theatre's Transformation season of plays
- 2002: Stamps for the Royal Mail: Love Occasion series
- 2001/2003: Typographic artwork for The Guardian Newspaper
- 2003: Typographic artworks for VSO poster campaign 'We need professionals'
- 2002: National Theatre – Typographic artwork for ‘On Love’ by Alan Bennett – London, UK
- 2003: Typographic mural for The Guardian Newspaper building reception
- 2005: The Guardian – Typographic artwork for alternative Front Page
- 2009: ONE Africa – Typographic artwork for poster
- 2011: Clarks Shoes – Typographic artwork for wall display – London, UK
- 2012: FT Weekend Magazine – Typographic artwork for magazine cover
- 2012: San Miguel – Typographic artwork for mural wall – Spain
- 2014: Southbank – Typographic artwork for mural wall – London, UK
- 2016: A Life in Letterpress: Alan Kitching — Book published
- 2017: Glenlivet – Typographic artwork for packaging design
- 2017: National Union of Journalists – Typographic artwork for wall mural
- 2017: Comme des Garcons – Typographic artwork for apparel design
- 2018: Brexit – Typographic artwork for protest posters & merchandise
- 2018: Cleaver Square – Typographic artwork for signage
- 2018: FX – Typographic artwork for magazine cover
- 2018: Bridge Theatre – Typographic artwork for ‘Allelujah!’ production – London, UK
- 2018: Alan Kitching's A-Z London – Box Set
- 2018: Globe Theatre – Typographic artwork for ‘Emilia’ production – London, UK
- 2018: Tipoteca – Typographic artwork for museum – Cornuda, Italy
- 2019: British Airways – Typographic artwork for 100th anniversary
- 2019: English Heritage – Typographic artwork for Corporate Identity for 2019
- 2019: Kia & Sunday Times – Typographic artwork for advertorial
- 2020: Folio Society — ‘ The Stories of English’ — Typographic artwork for book cover design
- 2020: FORA – Typographic artwork for Berners St Map
- 2020: Hall for Cornwall – Typographic artwork for triptych – Truro, UK
- 2020: Get Impressed – Typographic artwork for book cover design
- 2021: The Poster: A Visual History: ‘Taxi’ typographic artwork featured in book, V and A.
- 2022: Berry Bros & Rudd Wine – Typographic artwork for spread in No. 3 catalogue
- 2022: Woman Life Freedom – Typographic artwork for campaign poster
- 2022: POMPE charity – Typographic artwork for online assets
- 2022: The Art File – Typographic artwork for greeting card collections
- 2023: PORT Magazine – Typographic artwork for editorial spread
- 2023: Collins Agency – Limited Edition Print for 15-year anniversary
- 2024: AGI Congress – Letterpress Workshop & Lecture at The Poster Archive – Basel, Switzerland
- 2024: Chemistry World – Antiaromaticity – Typographic artwork for magazine
- 2024: Johns Hopkins Magazine – Breaking Barriers – Typographic artwork
- 2024: Mary Quant Wall Mural – Typographic artwork – London, UK
- 2024: Ferrari – Typographic Artwork Print – Limited Edition of 10

== Exhibitions ==
- 1992: Gallery at Pentagram, SOLO SHOW
- 1993: Royal College of Art, SOLO SHOW
- 1994: Crafts Council 'True to Type', 5 works, catalogue, ISBN 1870145 35 6
- 1994: D&AD "Festival of Excellence', 4 works
- 1994: Paperpoint shop, several works
- 1996: '20 Designers for a Silhouette', Centre Pompidou, Paris
- 1996: Royal Mail Stamps, London
- 1997: 'British Graphic Design', Cologne, Germany
- 1997: The Gallery at Pentagram, London
- 1998: Coningsby Gallery SOLO SHOW
- 1998: The British Pavilion, 'Information expertise @ UK'; The Library and Information Commission, Amsterdam
- 1999: 'A K TypeArt 98', The Coningsby Gallery, London, one man show
- 1999: The Coningsby Gallery — 'A K TypeArt 98', Solo Exhibition – London, UK
- 2000: 'Powerhouse', UK
- 2001: Gallery at Pentagram, 'In Darkest England'
- 2002: Gallery at Pentagram, London, one man show
- 2004: Public Address System, London and Berlin
- 2004: Pax Britannica, London Advanced Graphics London
- 2016: Somerset House
- 2016: The Lighthouse, Glasgow
- 2017: Manning Tree – Solo Exhibition – London, UK
- 2018: London Craft Week – Open Studio – London, UK
- 2019: Chelsea Arts Club – Solo Exhibition – London, UK
- 2019: Ditchling Museum of Art + Craft – Solo Exhibition – Ditchling, UK
- 2021: Coningsby Gallery – Solo Exhibition – London, UK
- 2022: AGI Congress – Typographic poster – Group Exhibition— Trieste, Italy
- 2023: AGI Congress – Typographic poster – Group Exhibition – Auckland, New Zealand
- 2024: AGI Congress – Typographic poster – Group Exhibition —Basel, Switzerland
- 2024: Chelsea Arts Club – A-Z London – Solo Exhibition – London, UK
- 2024: The Coningsby Gallery – Two Printers, Duo Exhibition — London, UK

== Talks and conferences ==
- 1994: icograda, London
- 1995: icograda, Lisbon
- 1995: AGI (Alliance Graphique Internationale), Amalfi, Italy
- 1997: AGI (Alliance Graphique Internationale), Barcelona, Spain
- 1998: A Typ.1, Lyon, France
- 2002: University of NSW Sydney & AGI Ideas Melbourne Australia
- 2002: AGI (Alliance Graphique Internationale), Zurich/Pontresina, Switzerland
- 2003: Typo3 Johannesburg SA
- 2004: London College of Communication 23/6/04
- 2004: Forum Laus, Barcelona May 2004
- 2005: AGI (Alliance Graphique Internationale), Berlin

== Guest lectures and workshops ==
- 1966: 'Frontiers of Printmaking', Michael Rothenstein, Library of Congress 66-24551
- 1999–2000: Hereford – College of Art
- 1974 Printed in Watford, Watford School of Art, Herts.
- 1993: The Sixties, David Mellor
- 1994: D&AD Annual
- 1995: D&AD Annual
- 1996 D&AD Annual
- 1996: 'G1 subj: contemp, design, graphic,
- 1996: 'A Double Life of 80 AGI designers .....' Armando Milani/Burgo
- 1997 'First Choice', Ken Cato, ISBN
- 1999: Royal Mail Millennium Stamps
- 1999: New Design: London, The Edge of Graphic Design, Ed. E.M.Gomez, Rockport, USA, ISBN 1-56496-562-7 D&AD Annual
- 2000: Rotterdam - Willem de Kooning Academie
- 2000: Anthony Froshaug: Typography & Texts (2 vols), Robin Kinross ISBN 0-907259-13-8
- 2001: Master of the 20th Century, Ed. Mervyn Kurlansky/Icograda, Graphis, New York ISBN 1-888001-85-2
- 2002: Helvetica – Homage to a Typeface, Lars Müller, Switzerland ISBN 3-907044-87-8
- 2002: Copenhagen – I T University
- 2002: The Graphics Book, D&AD, Rotovision, ISBN 2-88046-550-8
- 2003: Creative Island, John Sorrell, Lawrence King, ISBN 1-85669-305-8
- 2003: The Thames & Hudson Dictionary of Graphic Design and Designers
- 2004: D&AD Workout
- 2004: University of Delaware
- 2015: Workshop, Tipoteca, Italy Books on Alan Kitching or featuring work
- 2015: Tipoteca – Legacy of Letter Tour & Workshop – Cornuda, Italy
- 2015: A-Z in Letterpress, Laurence King, London, ISBN 9781780674810
- 2016: A Life in Letterpress, Laurence King, London
- 2016: Hay Festival – Guest Lecturer & Book Signing – Wales, UK
- 2017: Letter Exchange – Guest Lecturer – London, UK
- 2018: Woolwich Art Fair – Letterpress Workshop & Lecturer — London, UK
- 2019: TIPO – Guest Lecturer – Azores, Portugal
- 2019: Lettering Arts Trust – Letterpress Workshop – London, UK
- 2019: The Typography Workshop – Letterpress Workshop – London, UK
- 2020: Residency Art Centre USA – Letterpress Workshop – California, USA
- 2020: Ditchling Museum of Art + Craft – Visiting Lecturer – Ditchling, UK
- 2021: ESAD, Superior School of Arts and Design – Letterpress Workshop – Porto, Portugal
- 2022: Falmouth University – Visiting Lecturer – Falmouth, UK
- 2022: Hall for Cornwall – Talk/Q&A – Cornwall, UK
- 2023: Collins Agency – Online Talk/Q&A – Remote
- 2024: AGI Congress — Letterpress Workshop & Lecture at The Poster Archive – Basel, Switzerland

== Bibliography ==
1970: 'Typography Manual', School of Art, Watford College of Technology

2016. 'A life in Letterpress, Laurence King, London.
