= Laurence Dunmore =

British graphic designer and film director

- Occupations: Graphic designer and film director
- Awards: Cannes Lion (2002)

Laurence Dunmore is a British graphic designer and film director whose first major collaboration was the British production of The Libertine in 2005. He is a member of Ridley Scott Associates and has directed advertisements for AT&T, BMW, ING and Turkish Airlines.

== Career ==
Dunmore began his career as a graphic designer, studying on the now defunct Media and Production Design Degree (and also as Head of the Student Union in 1984) at the London College of Printing (now London College of Communication) under Brian Grimbley and Anthoney Froshaug. He left the course before completion to work with Howard Brown working for clients such as Richard Curtis (through Faber & Faber), Goldcrest Films and the Post Office, prior to joining Pentagram Design, when Brown became a partner in 1987. By 1988, Dunmore had set up Laurence Dunmore Design working for the record industry, designing covers for Enya (Watermark) and The Jeremy Days.

Soon after, Dunmore began to make music videos through a production company, The Oil Factory. He scaled down his design business to focus his career on film and media, a move that eventually brought him to Ridley Scott Associates in 1997. Dunmore's design business was a fertile ground for graphic talent with collaborators moving on to form design companies including MetaDesign London and Struktur Design.

Dunmore was quoted in a BBC interview as saying: "I'm a British director, I'm meant to make a gangster film as my first movie."

== Awards ==
At the 2002 Cannes Film Festival, Dunmore won a Cannes Lion, and in 2006 at the British Independent Film Awards, he was nominated for Best Director of a British Independent Film.
