= The Diary of Anne Frank (1995 film) =

1995 film by Akinori Nagaoka

- Theatrical release poster
- Directed by: Akinori Nagaoka
- Written by: Hachirō Konno; Roger Pulvers
- Based on: The Diary of a Young Girl by Anne Frank
- Produced by: Masao Maruyama; Yasuteru Iwase
- Cinematography: Hitoshi Yamaguchi
- Edited by: Harutoshi Ogata
- Music by: Michael Nyman
- Production company: Madhouse
- Distributed by: Toho
- Release date: August 19, 1995 (Japan)
- Running time: 102 minutes
- Country: Japan
- Language: Japanese

The Diary of Anne Frank (アンネの日記, An'ne no Nikki) is a 1995 Japanese animated historical film based on Anne Frank's 1942–1944 The Diary of a Young Girl. It is a feature film by Madhouse, was directed by Akinori Nagaoka and released on August 19, 1995.

== Voice cast ==
Character	Voice actor		
Character	Japanese	English	French
Anne Frank	Reina Takahashi	Marissa Davison	Noémie Orphelin
Margot Frank	Seiko Tano	Vanessa Ackerman	Vanessa Ackerman
Edith Frank	Fumie Kashiyama	Béla Gruschka	Christine Paris
Otto Frank	Gō Katō	Allan Wenger	Jean-Pol Brissart
Jopie (Lies)	Naomi Sekida	Estelle Heinaux	Solange Boulanger
Monsieur Van Daan	Jirō Sakagami	Jimmy Shuman	Olivier Proust
Madame Van Daan	Tetsuko Kuroyanagi	Patricia Kessler	Françoise Rigal
Peter Van Daan	Tsuyoshi Kusanagi	Jacques Saint Just	Maël Davan-Soulas
Miep Gies	Yoshie Taira	Sharon Mann	Laurence Dourlens
Docteur Dussel	Yūsuke Takita	Jean Fontaine	Paul Borne
Koophuis	Takurō Nakayoshi	Steve Gadler	
Professor Kepler	Gō Endō	Bertie Cortez	
German soldiers	Hiroyuki Kawada; Riki Kagami	Peter Wollasch; Jimmy Shuman; Steve Gadler; Allan Wenger	
Additional radio voice	Keishi Kawaguchi	Leslie Clack	

== Production ==
Nagaoka's film features new character designs by Katsuyuki Kubo and features a score composed by Michael Nyman, including two songs, "If" (which incorporates "Time Lapse" from A Zed & Two Noughts) and "Why," which have become concert works. The former also appeared in an altered form in the film, The Libertine. The singer is contralto Hilary Summers. "Candlefire" as well as piano-only versions of "If" and Why" appear on Nyman's 2005 release, The Piano Sings.

== Release ==
The Nagaoka film was released with an English language adaptation, via a DVD release in French (as Le Journal d'Anne Frank) with English subtitles. A release in North America was set for 2015, but went unreleased for several years. The English version was finally released for free on the official YouTube channel on May 3, 2020. The English version is currently under Creative Commons Attribution License on YouTube. The French and English language versions replaced the Michael Nyman score with a new one by Carine H.D. Gutlerner. The international version was shortened to 87 minutes.

== Soundtrack ==
The Diary of Anne Frank

Soundtrack album by Michael Nyman
- Released: 1995
- Genre: Soundtrack
- Label: Virgin Venture

Michael Nyman chronology
Carrington (1995)	The Diary of Anne Frank (1995)	After Extra Time (1996)

"If" and "Why" have become staples of Michael Nyman's concerts and were rerecorded as piano solos on The Piano Sings.

=== Track listing ===
1. Amsterdam Dawn
2. Anne's Birthday
3. The Schoolroom
4. Letter From Germany
5. Goodbye Moortje
6. Candlefire
7. Renewal
8. Light Of Love
9. Chatterbox Waltz
10. Hanukah
11. Spring Freedom
12. Concentration Camp
13. If
14. First Kiss
15. D-Day
16. The Diary Of Hope
17. Silent Separation
18. Lament For Lost Youth
19. Why

== Reception ==
Anime News Network's Justin Sevakis said that "even a story as powerful as Anne Frank's cannot overcome truly odious filmmaking and weird directorial choices that just don't work" and that he couldn't "think of a worse way to experience the story than watching this film".
