= Derek Birdsall =

British graphic designer (1934–2024)

Derek Birdsall, RDI (1 August 1934 – 4 May 2024) was a British graphic designer.

== Early life ==
Birdsall was born in Wakefield, Yorkshire on 1 August 1934, and attended The King's School, Pontefract, Wakefield College of Art and Central School of Arts and Crafts in London. "At Central, Birdsall came under the influence of Anthony Froshaug, who – alongside Herbert Spencer and Edward Wright – taught his students the difference between beautiful lettering and typography proper, with its pre-eminent concerns of clarity, directness and, above all, textual legibility." Birdsall failed to earn a diploma, however, and began his career in design in the late 1950s and early 1960s.

== Career ==
Birdsall's career and fame were built on a variety of designs and commissions. During his long career—among much other work—Birdsall designed Penguin book covers and Pirelli calendars; he art-directed several magazines (including Nova and Mobil Oil's Pegasus; and he designed books for the Yale Center for British Art, the Tate, the V&A and the British Council and designed Common Worship: Services and Prayers for the Church of England in 2000.

Alongside his practice in design, Birdsall also taught design at the Royal College of Art beginning in 1987. Birdsall was the author of Notes On Book Design, published by Yale University Press in 2004.

== Personal life and death ==
Birdsall married in 1954 and had three sons and one daughter, including actor Jesse Birdsall. His daughter Elsa has followed him into the design industry.

Derek Birdsall died on 4 May 2024, at the age of 89.

== Books and articles on Birdsall ==
- Myerson, Jeremy, White space, black hat, Eye 9, Wordsearch Ltd, 1993.
- Thompson, Philip, Derek Birdsall – Typographer, Baseline 28, Bradbourne Publishing, 1999.
- Birdsall, Derek, Notes on Book Design, Yale University Press, 2004. ISBN 978-0-300-10347-2.
