= Ragusan libertine =

Currency of the Republic of Ragusa

Libertine is a type of silver coin forged and used in the Republic of Ragusa that had its capital city in Dubrovnik. It was minted between 1791 and 1795. The motto for the Republic was Libertas meaning freedom hence the name of the coin.
