= Roger Fawcett-Tang =

Roger Fawcett-Tang is a British graphic designer with a special interest in book design and calendars. He has written several books about design.

Together with his wife Sanne Tang, Fawcett-Tang operates Struktur Design, which was formed in 1995 following his departure from MetaUnion Design in London.

The company is a vehicle for the couple to publish art and act as a design consultancy. Fawcett-Tang has written, edited and compiled a number of influential books including Mapping, An Illustrated Guide to Navigational Systems. He began his career with Laurence Dunmore Design in 1990 and then moved on to Union Design in 1991, before the formation of MetaUnion in 1995.

He has spoken at events such as Talking Graphics at the London College of Communication and Ideas 2007: Creativity Beyond Borders.

== Publications ==
- Mapping : an illustrated guide to graphic navigational systems / compiled and edited by Roger Fawcett-Tang; essays by William Owen. Mies, Switzerland; Hove : RotoVision, 2002. 208 p. : col. ill.; 30 cm. ISBN 978-2-88046-707-4
- Fawcett-Tang, Roger. New book design / compiled and edited by Roger Fawcett-Tang; introduction and interviews by Caroline Roberts. London : Laurence King, 2004. 191 p. : col. ill.; 29 cm. Includes index. ISBN 978-1-85669-366-0 (pbk)
- No brief : graphic designers’ personal projects / John O’Reilly; CD and image compilation with Roger Fawcett-Tang. Hove : RotoVision, c2002. 1 v. : col. ill.; 30 cm. One CD-ROM in pocket attached to inside front cover. Includes bibliographical references. ISBN 978-2-88046-694-7
- Experimental formats & packaging : creative solutions for inspiring graphic design / compiled by Roger Fawcett-Tang and Daniel Mason. Hove : Rotovision, 2004. Mies, Switzerland; Hove, UK : RotoVision, c2004. 1 v, (various pagings) : col. ill.; 27 cm. Includes bibliographical references (p. 299). ISBN 978-2-88046-799-9 (cased)
- Experimental formats : books, brochures, catalogues / compiled and edited by Roger Fawcett-Tang; introduction by Chris Foges; section introductions by John O’Reilly. Crans-Près-Céligny; Hove : RotoVision, c2001. 79, 79 p. : col. ill.; 27 cm. Includes bibliographical references and index. ISBN 978-2-88046-508-7 (pbk.)
- Fawcett-Tang, Roger. Experimental formats.2 : books, brochures, catalogs / Roger Fawcett-Tang. Mies; Hove : RotoVision, c2005. 80, 79 p. : col. ill.; 27 cm. Tête-bêche format. ISBN 978-2-88046-807-1
