= Libertine (magazine) =

British women's magazine

- Editor: Debbi Evans
- Categories: Female
- Frequency: Quarterly basis
- First issue: 2013; 12 years ago
- Company: Lovelace & Carter, Ltd
- Country: United Kingdom
- Language: English

Libertine is the trade name of Lovelace & Carter, Ltd. It was a women's quarterly magazine featuring topics such science and technology, design, culture, and women in media. The strap line for the publication is “For Widely Interested Women”, highlighting the brand focus on providing a diversity of content in a market that some perceive as narrowly focused on diets and appearance.

== History ==
Lovelace & Carter Ltd was launched in early 2013, by Debbi Evans. The first issue of Libertine was published in April of the same year. Evans has a background in technology journalism and aimed to create in Libertine “the kind of magazine I'd always wanted to read.” By cultivating contents from a wide range of authors and journalists, Libertine has begun to gain recognition in the UK as a publication attempting to change women's media by providing a range of content that has greater appeal.

== Content ==
Each quarterly publication has a theme, around which the majority of features and even advertisements are focused. Additionally, each issue includes a multi-page feature called “Curiosities,” which is a “collection of factoids, treasures, and oddities” related to the theme of the issue. The first issue focused on “Space,” and featured actress Gillian Anderson on the cover. Contents included articles on the future of robotics and cloud computing in work and business, the philosophy of space travel, and the spread of SMS and mobile technology throughout Africa by social enterprises.

== Press and reception ==
Libertine has been featured in many other publications as it begins to change the face of women's media. Press can be found in the New Statesman, The Guardian, Harper’s Bazaar, and the Press Gazette. Additionally, Libertine was featured in the Colourliving gift guide for 2013.

The Autumn 2013 issue focusing on Cities & Power also received recognition in several online publications.
