= Anthony Froshaug =

English typographer, teacher, and designer (1920-1984)

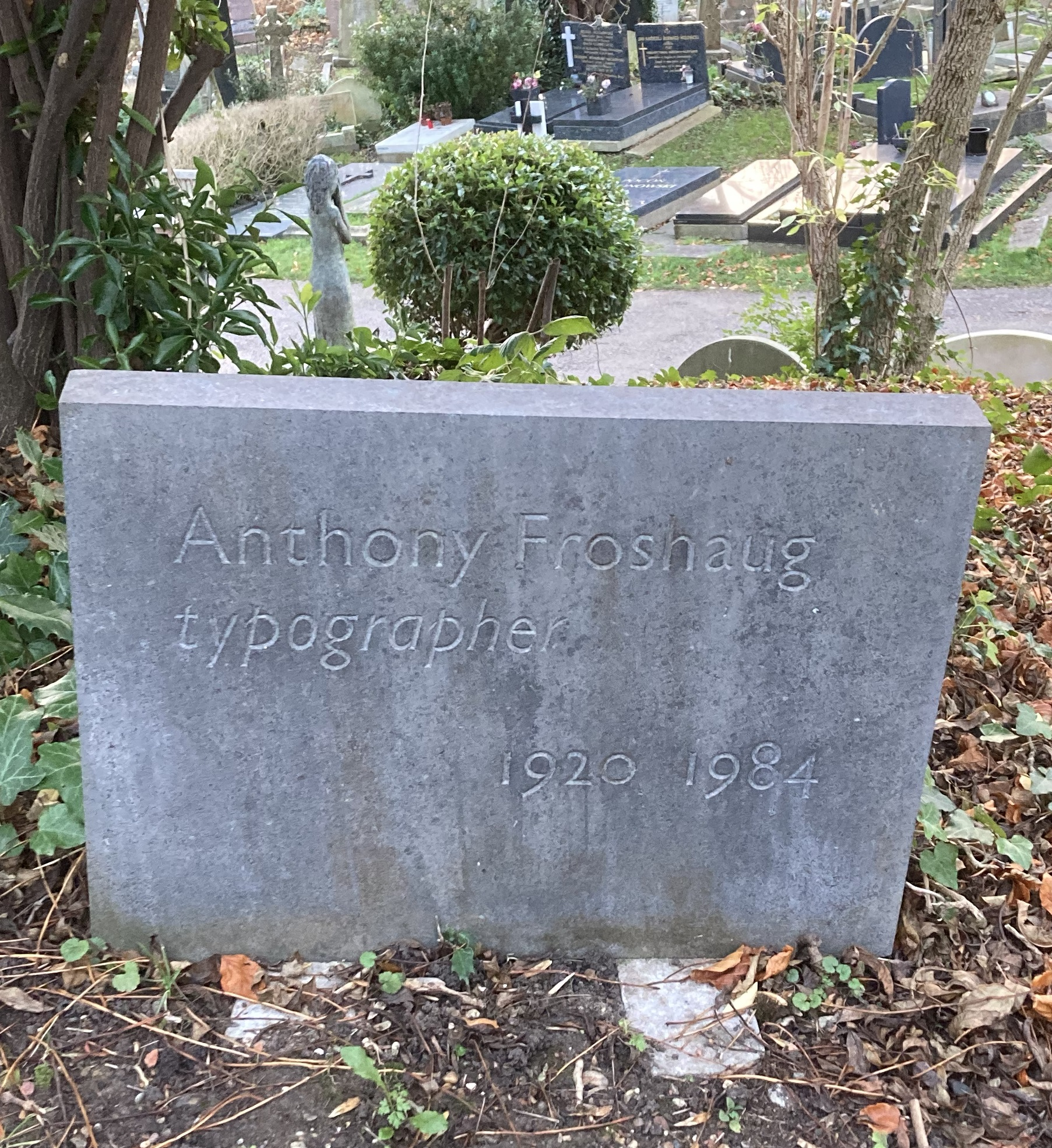
Grave of Anthony Froshaug in Highgate Cemetery. The stone was carved by Dutch letter-cutter Françoise Berserik, the design based on Gill Sans, Froshaug’s preferred typeface.

Anthony Froshaug (1920–1984) was an English typographer, designer and teacher, born in London to a Norwegian father and English mother.

Influenced by ideas of European modernism, particularly the work of Jan Tschichold, Froshaug is considered by some to be the most convincing exponent of modern typography in Britain.

Anthony Froshaug's archive is located at the University of Brighton Design Archives. A significant collection of Froshaug’s printed ephemera, representing his work between 1945 and 1965 is held at St Bride Library in London. This material originally formed the basis of a retrospective exhibition held at Watford College of Technology in 1965. St Bride Library also has a number of original letterpress formes relating to Froshaug’s work.

== Education ==
Froshaug attended Charterhouse School and studied book production and wood engraving at the Central School of Arts & Crafts from 1937 to 1939.

== Career ==
=== Design and typography ===
On leaving the Central in 1939 he began to practice as a freelance graphic designer and typographer. As a typographer, he has been viewed as unusual in running his own small (un-private) press, including two periods of printing in Cornwall (1949–52, 1954–7). He worked with Alan Kitching.

=== Teaching ===
Froshaug was a natural teacher: he taught typography, first at the Central School (1948–9, 1952–3), then at the Hochschule für Gestaltung Ulm (1957–61), the Royal College of Art in London (1961–4), Watford School of Art (1964–6); in 1970 he returned to teach (part-time) at the Central School, continuing there until illness forced him to stop. He later also taught at the London College of Printing Department of Art and Design from 1980–82.

As both a practitioner and a teacher, Froshaug preferred an experimental workshop environment with opportunities for discussion, rather than more formal learning structures.

He is buried on the eastern side of Highgate Cemetery.
