= Stephen Jeffreys =

British playwright and playwriting teacher

John Stephen Gerrard Jeffreys (22 April 1950 – 17 September 2018) was a British playwright and playwriting teacher. He wrote original plays, films and play adaptations and also worked as translator. Jeffreys is best known for his play The Libertine about the Earl of Rochester, which was performed at the Steppenwolf Theatre Company in Chicago with John Malkovich as Rochester, and later adapted into a film starring Malkovich and Johnny Depp.

== Career ==
Jeffreys attended the Stationers' Company's School before going to University of Southampton, graduating with an English literature degree in 1972. In 1975 he started working at the Royal Court Theatre in London as assistant electrician. He began writing plays about the same time.

His first play, Like Dolls or Angels (1977), won the Sunday Times Playwriting Award at the National Student Drama Festival. He helped set up the touring company Pocket Theatre Cumbria, for which he wrote several plays. His 1982 adaptation of Hard Times for four actors was staged all over England and the United States. Between 1987 and 1989 he was Arts Council writer-in-residence for the touring theatre company Paines Plough. His breakthrough as playwright was in 1989 when his play Valued Friends at the Hampstead Theatre in London won the Evening Standard Theatre Award and Critics' Circle Theatre Award for Most Promising Playwright. It was based on his experience sharing a basement flat in London's Earls Court with three others who were also working in theatre.

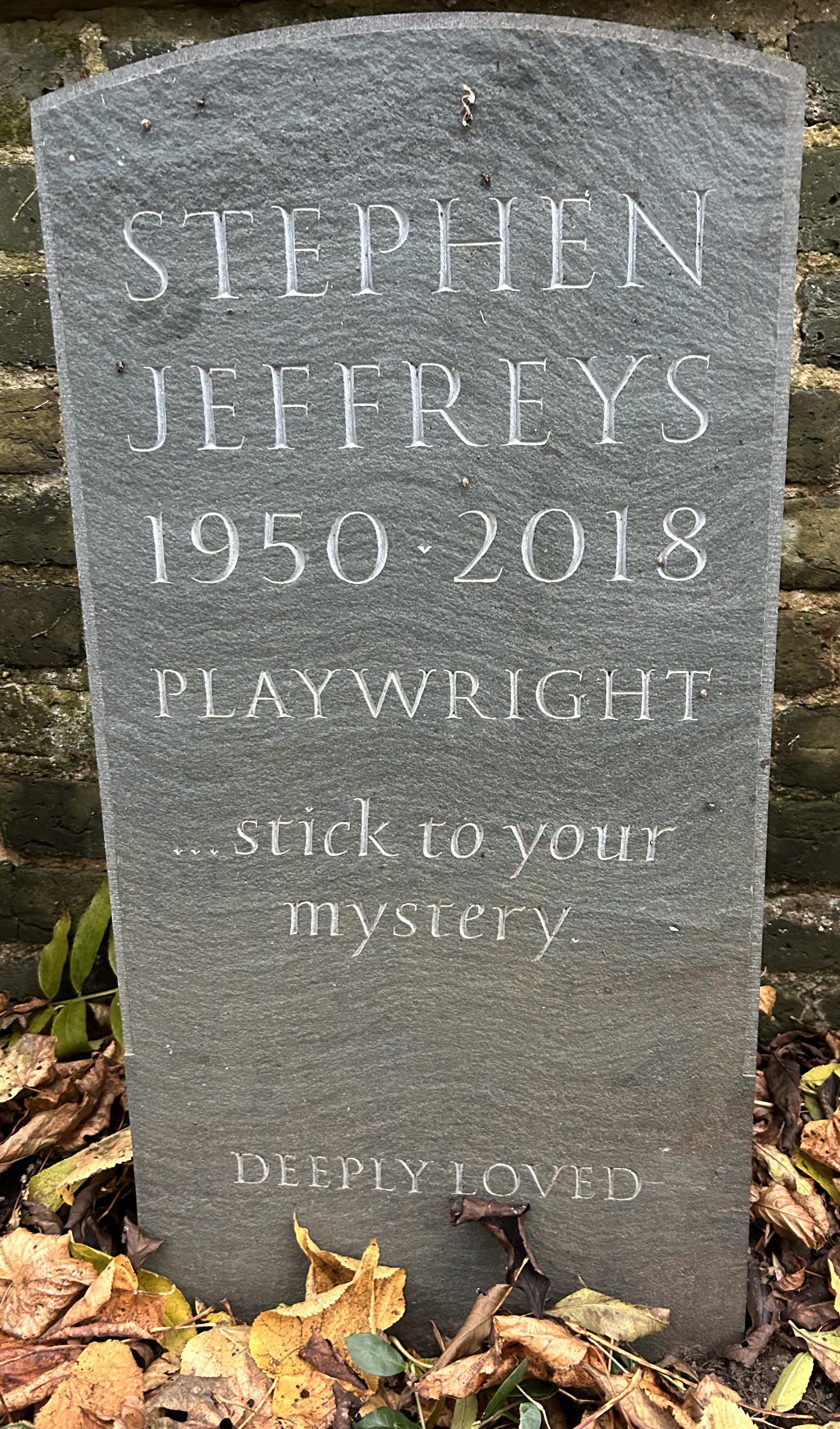
Grave of Stephen Jeffreys in Highgate Cemetery

Starting in 1994, he worked as Literary Associate for the Royal Court Theatre for eleven years, contributing to the development of plays such as Mojo by Jez Butterworth. Here, he also gave playwriting workshops, which were attended by playwrights such as Simon Stephens, Roy Williams, April De Angelis and Poppy Corbett. Stephens later said about Jeffreys: "Stephen Jeffreys is as important a teacher as he is brilliant a writer. Without him, I wouldn't have been able to write the plays that I have written." Jeffreys was commissioned to write a book on playwriting based on his workshops, which was not yet finished when he died in 2018. Completed by his friends, colleagues and widow Annabel Arden, the book was published posthumously in 2019 by Nick Hern Books.

Besides plays, Jeffreys wrote the films The Libertine and Diana. He co-authored the Beatles musical Backbeat and translated The Magic Flute for the English National Opera.

Jeffreys died on the 17th September, 2018 and his ashes were interred in the east side of Highgate Cemetery on the 21st July 2021.

== Written works ==
His plays and screenplays include:

- Like Dolls or Angels (1977)
- Hard Times (1982), a stage adaptation of the novel Hard Times by Charles Dickens
- Carmen 1936 (1984)
- Valued Friends (1990)
- The Clink (1990)
- A Jovial Crew (1992), an adaptation of Richard Brome's play A Jovial Crew
- A Going Concern (1993)
- The Libertine (1994), later made into a film with Johnny Depp (2005)
- I Just Stopped By to See the Man (2000)
- Interruptions (2001)
- Lost Land (2005).
- The Convict's Opera (2008), a reworking of The Beggar's Opera by John Gay, jointly commissioned by Out of Joint theatre company and Sydney Theatre Company.
- Backbeat (2011), co-written with Iain Softley)
- Diana (2013, screenplay based on Kate Snell's 2001 book, Diana: Her Last Love about Diana, Princess of Wales)

== Awards ==
- Sunday Times Playwriting Award (1977) for Like Dolls or Angels at the National Student Drama Festival
- Fringe First award (1984) for Carmen 1936 at the Edinburgh Fringe Festival
- Evening Standard Theatre Award and Critics Circle Theatre Award for Most Promising Playwright (1989).

== Personal life ==
He was married to theatre and opera director Annabel Arden.
