= The Libertine (2005 film) =

2005 British-Australian drama film

- Theatrical release poster
- Directed by: Laurence Dunmore
- Screenplay by: Stephen Jeffreys
- Based on: The Libertine (play) by Stephen Jeffreys
- Produced by: John Malkovich; Lianne Halfon; Russell Smith
- Starring: Johnny Depp; Samantha Morton; John Malkovich
- Cinematography: Alexander Melman
- Edited by: Jill Bilcock
- Music by: Michael Nyman
- Production companies: Isle of Man Film; Odyssey Entertainment
- Distributed by: Entertainment Film Distributors (United Kingdom); Roadshow Entertainment (Australia); The Weinstein Company (United States); Odyssey Entertainment (Overseas)
- Release dates: 11 November 2005 (AFI Fest); 18 November 2005 (United Kingdom)
- Running time: 114 minutes
- Countries: United Kingdom; United States; Australia
- Language: English
- Box office: $10.9 million

The Libertine is a 2005 period drama film, the first film directed by Laurence Dunmore. It was adapted by Stephen Jeffreys from his play of the same name, and stars Johnny Depp and Samantha Morton as John Wilmot, 2nd Earl of Rochester and Elizabeth Barry, with John Malkovich, Rosamund Pike, Rupert Friend, and Kelly Reilly in supporting roles. Set in 1675 England, the film chronicles the life of the decadent but brilliant Earl of Rochester, who is asked by King Charles II to write a play celebrating his reign, while simultaneously training Elizabeth Barry to improve her acting.

The film was shot on location on the Isle of Man and Wales. The setting for Rochester's home of Adderbury house was filmed on location at Montacute House, Montacute, Somerset and Charlecote Park, Warwickshire.

== Plot ==
In 1675, John Wilmot, Second Earl of Rochester, delivers a prologue of themes of his fondness for drink, his sexual proclivities, and his disdain for his audience.

King Charles II retracts his banishment of the earl as he has need of him in the House of Lords. Back in London, Rochester finds his "Merry Gang" friends, George Etherege and Charles Sackville, in a bawdy house. Rochester encounters on the street the thief Alcock. Impressed by his dishonesty, Rochester hires him as his gentleman. The Merry Gang introduce Rochester to its newest member, 18-year-old Billy Downs. Rochester warns Downs, "Young man, you will die of this company."

The Merry Gang attend a play where the actress Elizabeth Barry is booed off the stage, then refuses to participate in a curtain call and is fired. Rochester is taken with Barry, secures her re-employment with the theatre company, and undertakes to coach her in acting. Barry's acting improves dramatically and she delivers a brilliant performance in her next production. The King approaches Barry to spy on Rochester as to the progress of the intended tribute to the French Ambassador.

Charles, in need of money from France, asks Rochester to write a play in honour of the French Ambassador's visit. The king requests it be a "monument" to his reign. Rochester writes Sodom, or the Quintessence of Debauchery, a scathing satire of the king's reign, which he claims is "a monument to Charles" — just what the king had asked for. The play involves vulgar language, simulated sex acts, and Rochester portraying the king being serviced. At the premiere, the king, clearly offended, interrupts the play and confronts Rochester on the stage, whereupon Rochester flees London.

Later, Downs is mortally wounded in a sword fight outside the home of a Constable; Rochester backs away from his dying friend, whispering, "I told you."

Hiding from the king in the English countryside and sick with symptoms of syphilis, Rochester peddles phoney gynaecological "treatments" for women, including the selling of "potions" made from Alcock's urine. Rochester's face has become disfigured by syphilitic gummata, which he hides beneath a mask. Charles eventually tracks down Rochester, but decides that the worst punishment possible is to simply "let you be you". Rochester returns to his estate and wife, Elizabeth, admitting to having been constantly for five years under the influence of "the drink". Elizabeth declares her love for him.

Charles' choice of heir, his Roman Catholic brother James, Duke of York, leads to a confrontation in Parliament over the Exclusion Bill that would deny James the throne. Rochester uses make-up and a silver nose tip to hide the symptoms of syphilis as he enters the House of Lords, hobbling on two canes. His denunciation in the Lords of the bill is appreciated by the king when it is defeated. When Rochester reveals his desire to have wanted Barry as his wife she reveals she never had the desire to be the wife of anyone, she had a daughter by him that he was unaware of and this daughter is called Elizabeth.

Rochester returns to his estate where he is bedridden in the care of Elizabeth and his mother. A priest is summoned to "bring God to him" as his mother did not want Rochester to die as an atheist and Alcock. Before he dies, Rochester asks the priest to recite from Book of Isaiah, chapter 53; he also asks his wife to retell the story of how he had abducted her when she was 18 years old and they fell in love. Rochester's death is followed by a scene of Elizabeth Barry playing the role of his wife in The Man of Mode, the play about him written by his friend Etherege. The epilogue depicts Rochester slipping into the darkness of a fading candlelight, asking "Do you like me now?".

== Cast ==
- Johnny Depp as John Wilmot, 2nd Earl of Rochester
- John Malkovich as King Charles II
- Samantha Morton as Elizabeth Barry
- Rosamund Pike as Elizabeth Wilmot, Countess of Rochester (née Elizabeth Malet)
- Tom Hollander as Sir George Etherege
- Johnny Vegas as Charles Sackville, 6th Earl of Dorset
- Richard Coyle as Alcock
- Rupert Friend as Billy Downs
- Jack Davenport as Harris
- Kelly Reilly as Jane
- Clare Higgins as Molly Luscombe
- Francesca Annis as Rochester's mother
- Tom Burke as Vaughan
- Hugh Sachs as Ratcliffe

== Music ==
The score to the film was composed by Michael Nyman, and released as The Libertine: Music for the Film by Laurence Dunmore in November 2005. The music represents Nyman's last score for a major motion picture to date, and his last soundtrack release.

== Release ==
An unfinished version of the film was shown at the 2004 Toronto International Film Festival as a "work-in-progress". It was substantially recut before premiering in a completed version at the AFI Fest on 11 November 2005. It was released in the United Kingdom on 18 November 2005.

== Historical accuracy ==
Rochester is shown staging Sodom in front of Charles II, with Rochester taking the role of the King of Sodom. In fact the play was not published until 1684, a few years after Rochester's death in 1680, and the authorship of Sodom is disputed.

== Reception ==
=== Critical response ===
The film received mixed to negative reviews from critics. Film review aggregator Rotten Tomatoes reported that 34% of 121 sampled critics gave the film positive reviews and that it got a rating average of 4.8/10. The site's critical consensus reads, "Despite Johnny Depp's zealous performance, muddled direction and murky cinematography hinder The Libertine." Metacritic calculated an average score of 44 out of 100 based on 30 reviews, indicating "mixed or average reviews". Roger Ebert of the Chicago Sun-Times gave the film 3 stars out of 4 praising Johnny Depp's performance, stating "Libertines are not built for third acts. No self-respecting libertine lives that long. Johnny Depp finds sadness in the earl's descent, and a desire to be loved even as he makes himself unlovable. What a brave actor Depp is, to take on a role like this. Still, at the screenplay stage, The Libertine might have seemed a safer bet than Pirates of the Caribbean, a movie [which] studio executives reportedly thought was unreleasable."

=== Box office ===
The film has grossed $4,835,065 in North America and $6,016,999 in other territories, for a total of $10,852,064 worldwide.

=== Accolades ===
Award	Date of ceremony	Category	Recipient(s)	Result	Ref.
British Independent Film Awards	30 November 2005	Best British Independent Film	Laurence Dunmore	Nominated	
British Independent Film Awards	30 November 2005	Best Director	Laurence Dunmore	Nominated	
British Independent Film Awards	30 November 2005	Douglas Hickox Award (Best Debut Director)	Laurence Dunmore	Nominated	
British Independent Film Awards	30 November 2005	Best Actor	Johnny Depp	Nominated	
British Independent Film Awards	30 November 2005	Best Supporting Actor/Actress	Tom Hollander	Nominated	
British Independent Film Awards	30 November 2005	Best Supporting Actor/Actress	Rosamund Pike	Won	
British Independent Film Awards	30 November 2005	Most Promising Newcomer	Rupert Friend	Nominated	
British Independent Film Awards	30 November 2005	Best Technical Achievement	Ben Van Os (production design)	Nominated	
