= Mills =

Mills is the plural form of mill, but may also refer to:

== As a name ==
- Mills (surname), a common family name of English or Gaelic origin
- Mills (given name)
- Mills, a fictional British secret agent in a trilogy by writer Manning O'Brine

== Places ==
=== United States ===
- Mills, Kentucky, an unincorporated community
- Mills, Nebraska, an unincorporated community
- Mills, New Mexico, an unincorporated community
- Mills, Utah, an unincorporated community
- Trego (CDP), Wisconsin, an unincorporated census-designated place also known as Mills
- Mills, Wyoming, a town
- Mills County, Iowa
- Mills County, Texas
- Mills Township (disambiguation)
- Mount Mills (California)
- Mills Glacier, Rocky Mountain National Park, Colorado
- Mills Lake (California), California
- Lake Mills (Washington), a reservoir
- Mills Reservation, New Jersey, a county park
- Mills River (North Carolina)
- Mills Creek (disambiguation), two American streams
- Camp Mills, Long Island, New York, a military installation established in 1917, incorporated into Mitchel Field in 1938
- Fort Mills, Corregidor, Philippines, a former US Army facility
- Mills Valley (Juab County), a basin in Utah.

=== Antarctica ===
- Mills Cliff, Ellsworth Land
- Mount Mills (Antarctica), Ross Dependency
- Mills Peak, Victoria Land
- Mills Valley (Victoria Land, Antarctica)

=== Elsewhere ===
- Mills Peak (New Zealand), a mountain at Milford Sound
- Mills Peak (South Georgia), South Georgia Island, south Atlantic Ocean
- Mills (crater), a crater on the Moon

== Buildings ==
- Mills Building (disambiguation), various buildings
- Mills House (disambiguation), various historical houses
- Mills House No. 1, No. 2 and No. 3, three men's hotels in New York City, two of which remain
- Mills Mill, Greenville, South Carolina, a textile mill converted into condominiums
- The Mills, Hong Kong.

== Schools ==
- Mills College, a women's college in Oakland, California
- Mills University Studies High School, Little Rock, Arkansas
- Mills High School, Millbrae, California

== Titles ==
- Viscount Mills and Baron Mills, titles in the Peerage of the United Kingdom
- Mills baronets, three titles in the Baronetage of the United Kingdom, two extant

== Other ==
- The Mills Corporation, a major developer of shopping malls in the United States
- Mills Novelty Company, a defunct manufacturer of coin-operated machines in the United States
- Mills Cross Telescope, a radio telescope in New South Wales, Australia
- Mills Observatory, Dundee, Scotland, the only full-time public astronomical observatory in the UK
- Mills Memorial Hospital, Terrace, British Columbia, Canada
- USS Mills (DE-383), a US Navy destroyer escort which served in World War II
- Mills (sports brand), an Indonesian sports apparel company
- Another name for the board game nine men's morris
- The Mills (band), a Colombian rock band

== See also ==
- Mills & Boon, a British publisher of romance novels
- Mills bomb, a popular name for a series of British hand grenades named after William Mills
- Mills Brothers, an African-American jazz and pop vocal group
- Mills Blue Rhythm Band, an American big band
