= Centre for Heritage, Arts and Textile =

- Headquarters: Tsuen Wan
- Area served: Hong Kong
- Key people: Takahashi Mizuki (Executive director)
- Website: mill6chat.org

Centre for Heritage, Arts and Textile (CHAT) is a non-profit art center located at The Mills, 45 Pak Tin Par Street, Tsuen Wan.

As the first and only art institution in Hong Kong dedicated to the preservation of textile cultural heritage, CHAT connects contemporary art, design, and history through a diverse range of projects, including exhibitions and collaborative learning programs. It pays tribute to the contributions of the textile industry in driving social and economic progress in Hong Kong's past, while challenging conventional notions of textile art.

The founding donor of CHAT is The D. H. Chen Foundation, with the main donor being Nan Fung Group. The current executive director and Chief Curator is Mizuki Takahashi.

== History ==
CHAT is a part of the heritage conservation project of The Mills, the former cotton-spinning mills of Nan Fung Textiles in Tsuen Wan, that was established in 1954. With the end of the era of mass production in the textile industry in Hong Kong, it closed in 2008. In 2014, Nan Fung Group announced the revitalization of Nan Fung Textile Mills 4, 5, and 6. The revitalized Nan Fung Textile Factory still retains many remnants of the textile mills and is divided into three parts: CHAT, an experiential retail space, and an incubation base for start-ups.

After years of renovation, CHAT opened on March 16, 2019. The inaugural exhibition titled Unfolding: Fabric of Our Life showcased works from seventeen contemporary artists and creative units from around the world. The opening ceremony featured a performance by the punk rock band, The Shakes, prompting reflection and imagination on the sweat and toil behind textile labor.

== Exhibition and events ==
=== Co-Learn ===
CHAT organizes three seasonal exhibitions each year, accompanied by a series of workshops and guided tours that align with the theme of each exhibition.

The D. H. Chen Foundation Gallery features a permanent exhibition called Welcome to the Spinning Factory!. It offers experiential workshops conducted by former textile factory workers, as well as displays of cotton spinning artifacts, historical images, videos showcasing the spinning process, a memory bank of textile factory workers, and exhibits showcasing the history of the textile factory. The gallery space was designed by the award-winning architectural group Assemble and design company HATO.

CHAT organizes a variety of events including workshops, talks, panel discussions, and seminars, with the aim of promoting textile culture, contemporary art, and design. These events target and collaborate with individuals from different communities and social groups. The workshops allow visitors to engage with textile materials and participate in creative activities such as making straight skirts, weaving bags, and upcycling textile artworks. The seminars invite designers, artists, curators, and scholars from diverse cultural backgrounds to exchange ideas and insights. In 2021, CHAT hosted an exhibition which featured the memory fabric by Laura Devendorf, 'A Fabric that Remembers'. A Thai textile artist Jakkai Siributr solo exhibition was hosted by CHAT in 2023, which offered a retrospective of the artist's work in the past two decades. In spring 2024, a group exhibition was hosted and it brought together contemporary art creations by 19 artists of Asian backgrounds.

=== Venues and facilities ===
The exhibition halls and creative spaces of CHAT include The D. H. Chen Foundation Gallery located on the 2nd floor of The Mills, Gallery 1 and 2, CHAT Lounge, CHAT Laboratory, as well as the CHAT Shop and The Hall on the ground floor.
