= Mills Lake (California) =

Lake in the state of California, United States

- Interactive map of Mills Lake
- Location: Inyo County, California, United States
- Coordinates: 37.4027°N 118.7762°W
- Type: Lake
- Part of: Crowley Lake Watershed
- Primary inflows: Mount Mills, Bear Creek Spire
- Primary outflows: Rock Creek (California) (Owens River)
- Surface elevation: 11,667 ft (3,556 m)

Mills Lake is a California waterbody along the Sierra Crest east of Ruby Peak and Mount Mills near Little Lakes Valley. The discharge of Mills Lake flows through Ruby Lake, Rock Creek Lake, and into Rock Creek.

== See also ==
- List of lakes in California
