= Mills Valley =

Mills Valley may refer to:

- Mills Valley (Victoria Land, Antarctica)
- Mills Valley (Juab County) in Utah
