= Mount Mills =

Mount Mills may refer to:

- Mount Mills (Alaska) on the Kenai Peninsula
- Mount Mills (California) in the Sierra Nevada range
- Mount Mills (Idaho)
- Mounts Mills, New Jersey, an unincorporated community
- Mount Mills (Antarctica) in the Dominion Range of Antarctica
