= Ruby Peak (California) =

Mountain in the American state of California

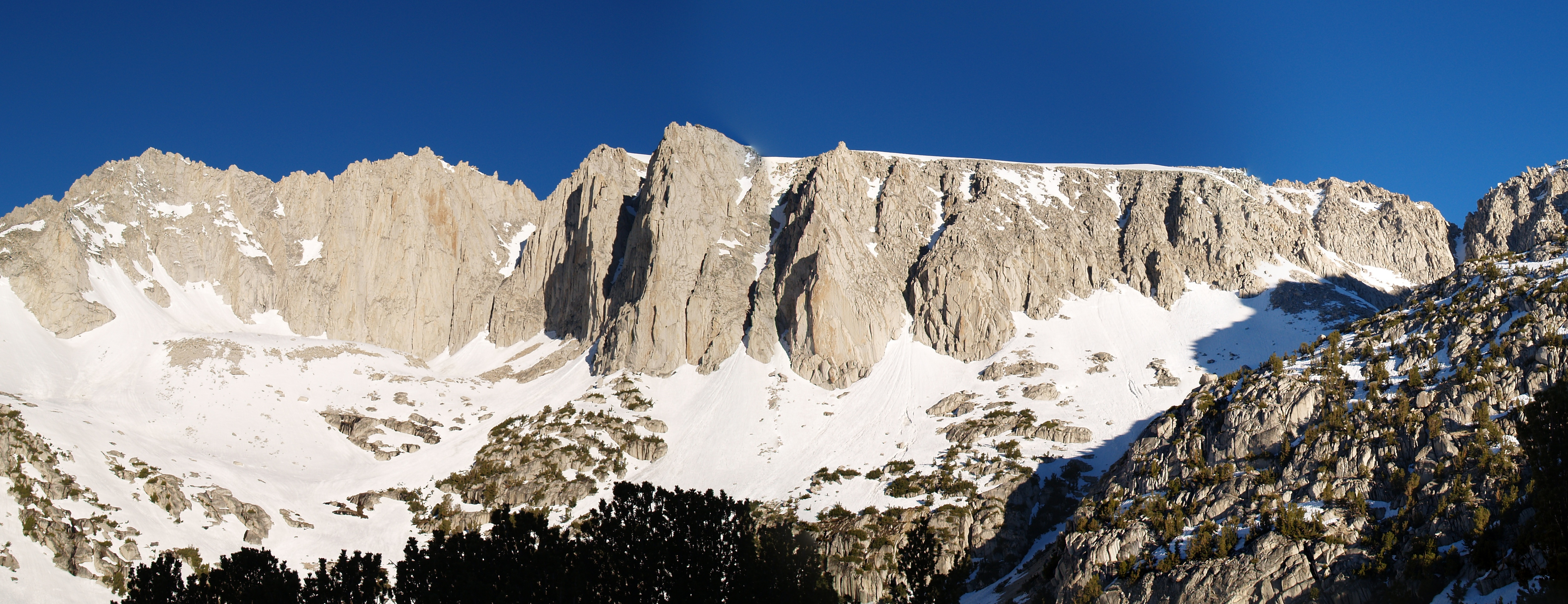
- Ruby Wall is in the center with Mount Mills on the left and Mono Pass on the right

Highest point
- Elevation: 13,194 ft (4,022 m) NAVD 88
- Prominence: 588 ft (179 m)
- Parent peak: Mount Mills
- Coordinates: 37°24′32″N 118°46′56″W

Geography
- Location within California
- Location: Fresno and Inyo counties, California
- Parent range: Sierra Nevada
- Topo map: USGS Mount Abbot

Climbing
- First ascent: 1946 by Fritz Gerstaker and Virginia Whitacre
- Easiest route: Scramble, class 3

Ruby Peak is a thirteener on the Sierra Crest, north of Mount Mills. It is in the John Muir Wilderness and on the boundary between the Sierra National Forest and the Inyo National Forest. It is near Mono Pass. The eastern slope drains into Rock Creek which feeds the Owens River while the western slopes drains in Mono Creek which feeds the South Fork of the San Joaquin River.

== Climbing ==
The peak's first ascent was prior to 1934 by Norman Clyde via the class 3 East Ridge, and on July 24, 1946, by Fritz Gerstaker and Virginia Whitacre made the first ascent of the class 3 West Couloir route. A grade IV, class 5.11 route, known as Technical Knockout, ascends Ruby Wall and features a large roof. It was first climbed by Richard Leversee, Kim Miller and Roanne Miller in July 1989.
