= The Mills, Hong Kong =

Landmark revitalization project by Nan Fung Group in Tsuen Wan, Hong Kong.

The Mills
- 南豐紗廠
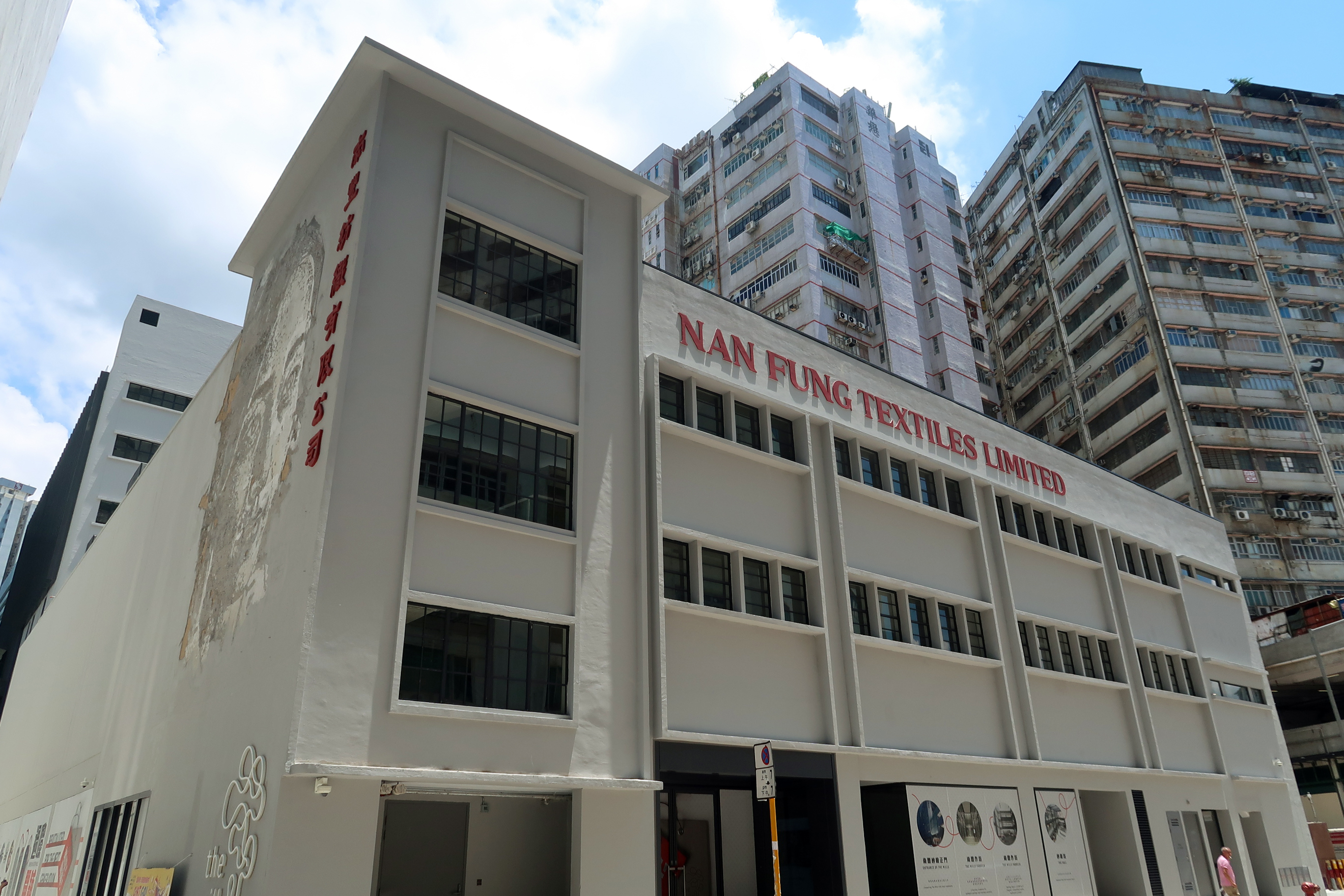
- Nan Fung Cotton Mills, on the left is a huge portrait of 'Nameless Heroes'.
- Interactive map of the The Mills area
- Former names: Nan Fung Cotton Mills

General information
- Status: Completed
- Location: Chai Wan Kok, No. 45 Pak Tin Par Street, Tsuen Wan, Hong Kong
- Coordinates: 22.3750707°N 114.1101695°E
- Completed: Unit 6: 1961; Unit 4: 1962; Unit 5: 1970
- Opened: December 6, 2012
- Renovation cost: 700 million Hong Kong dollars
- Owner: Nan Fung Group

Technical details
- Floor area: 24,500 square meters

Design and construction
- Architecture firm: Thomas Chow Architects(TCA)

Renovating team
- Main contractor: Paul Y. Engineering

Other information
- Number of stores: Approximately 60.

Website
- www.themills.com.hk

The Mills (Chinese: 南豐紗廠), formerly known as Nan Fung Cotton Mills, located at No. 45 Pak Tin Par Street, Chai Wan Kok, Tsuen Wan, Hong Kong, was founded in 1954 by Chen Din Hwa, known as the "King of Cotton Yarn", founder of Nan Fung Group. The total floor area is 24,500 square meters, making it the highest producing textile factory in Hong Kong at the time. Subsequently, Unit 1 to Unit 3 were dismantled after the filming of the fire scene in the 1997 Hong Kong film Lifeline and became the private residential estate Summit Terrace, while Unit 4 to Unit 6 ceased operation in 2008 and were converted into warehouses.

In 2014, Nan Fung Cotton Mills began revitalization works, and after completion of the project on December 6, 2018, it opened with spaces for work, a textile cultural and arts center, retail areas, and recreational spaces.

== History ==
In 1954, Chen Din Hwa, known as the "King of Cotton Yarn" and founder of Nan Fung Group, established Nan Fung Cotton Mills in the industrial area of Pak Tin Par Street in Tsuen Wan. Two years later, the factory was officially put into production, producing four hundred bales of cotton yarn per month at the time. The factory experienced rapid development after its establishment, leading to a shortage of labor. In July 1959, a labor dispute broke out due to the inability to maintain the "three-shift system", where workers were only required to work for eight hours per shift.

In the 1960s, Nan Fung continued to expand its business and acquired adjacent sites to establish six factories. Unit 6, Unit 4, and Unit 5 were completed in 1961, 1962, and 1970 respectively. During the golden age of Hong Kong's manufacturing industry, Nan Fung Cotton Mills was a leading cotton spinning producer in Hong Kong, renowned for its high annual production volume. At its peak, it produced 30 million pounds of cotton yarn annually, making it one of the top producers in the Hong Kong industry. In 1971, despite the significant slowdown in the development of Hong Kong's cotton spinning industry, Nan Fung Cotton Mills added 3,056 spindles and purchased 9,598 spindles, totaling an additional 12,656 spindles, making it one of the ten cotton spinning factories in Hong Kong to increase spindles among the thirty-plus cotton spinning factories that year; the affiliated weaving mill of Nan Fung Cotton Mills also added 288 looms that year.

In the 1980s, various regions across Asia entered industrialization. Taiwan and Southeast Asian countries attracted workers with low labor costs, while Mainland China began its reform and opening-up policy. Meanwhile, labor costs and land prices in Hong Kong continued to rise. Consequently, Hong Kong transitioned into a tertiary industry economy, with the manufacturing sector's contribution to the local GDP beginning to decline, dropping below 20% by 1989. As the manufacturing sector gradually declined, Units 1 to 3 of the factory were left vacant after relocating to the mainland in the 1990s. Following the filming of the final explosive scenes of the movie Lifeline in the factory in 1997, it was demolished and rebuilt as the current Summit Terrace. Units 4 to 6 also ceased spinning operations in 2008, converting the buildings into warehouses.

== Revitalization ==
In 2014, Nan Fung Group announced the revitalization of Nan Fung Cotton Mills, investing 700 million HKD to transform Units 4, 5, and 6, with a total floor area of 264,000 square feet (24,500 square meters), into a single architectural complex. The revitalization project was completed on December 6, 2018.

During the revitalization project, some of the textile factory's original features and designs, such as preserving the walls with green oil stains and using old-style iron frame windows made from the same materials and craftsmanship as before, were retained. Structural reinforcements were made to existing structures, and glass curtain walls were added. For instance, the font of "Nan Fung Cotton Mills" on the exterior wall of the factory had been discontinued, requiring remolding during restoration. The iron gates with the Nan Fung textile brand "Golden Cup" pattern, as well as the iron gates of Units 5 and the stairs of Unit 4, were also preserved. The factory's atrium utilized a large amount of glass, with skylights installed at the top to introduce natural light.

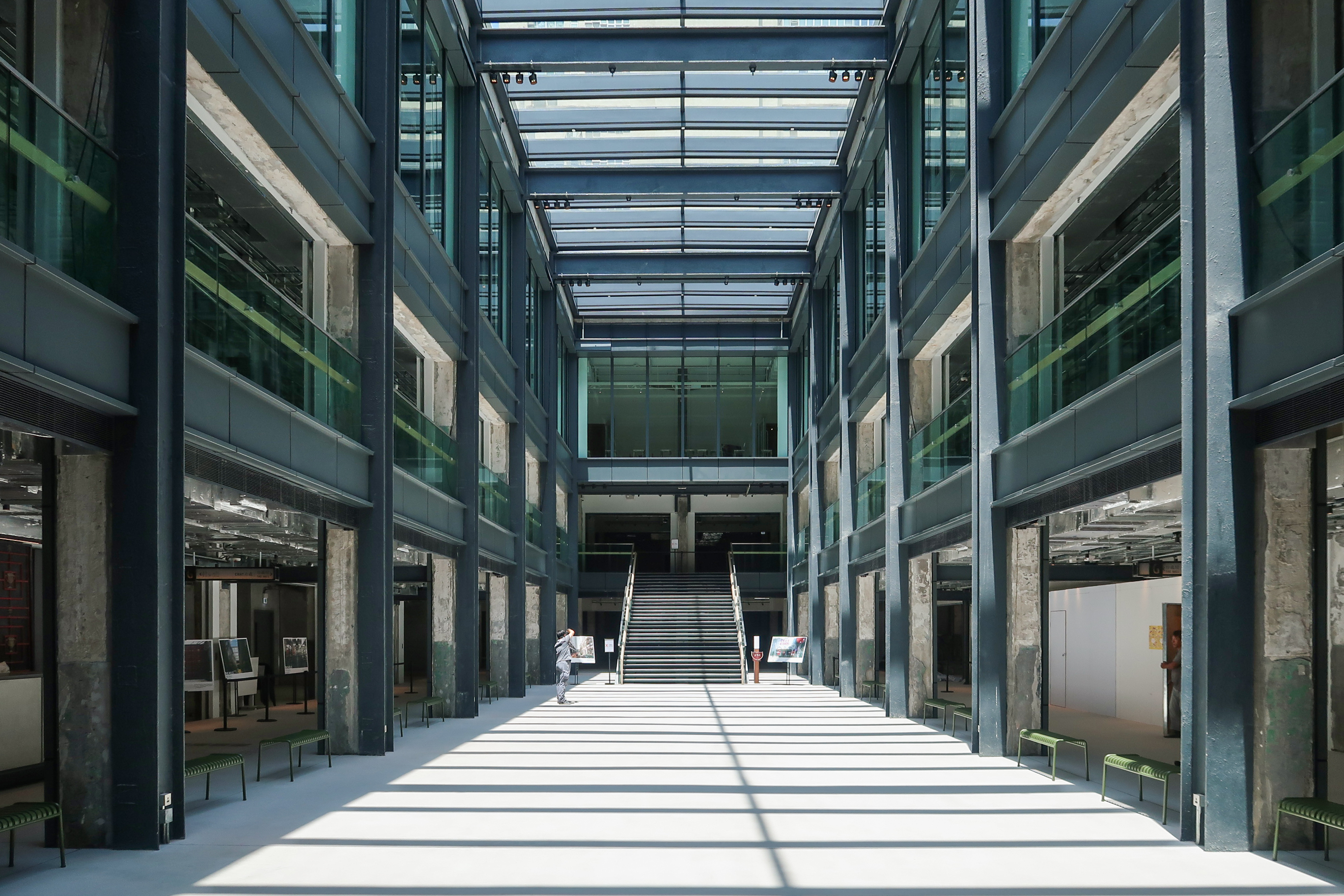
The atrium of Unit 6 uses a large amount of glass and features skylights to bring in natural light.

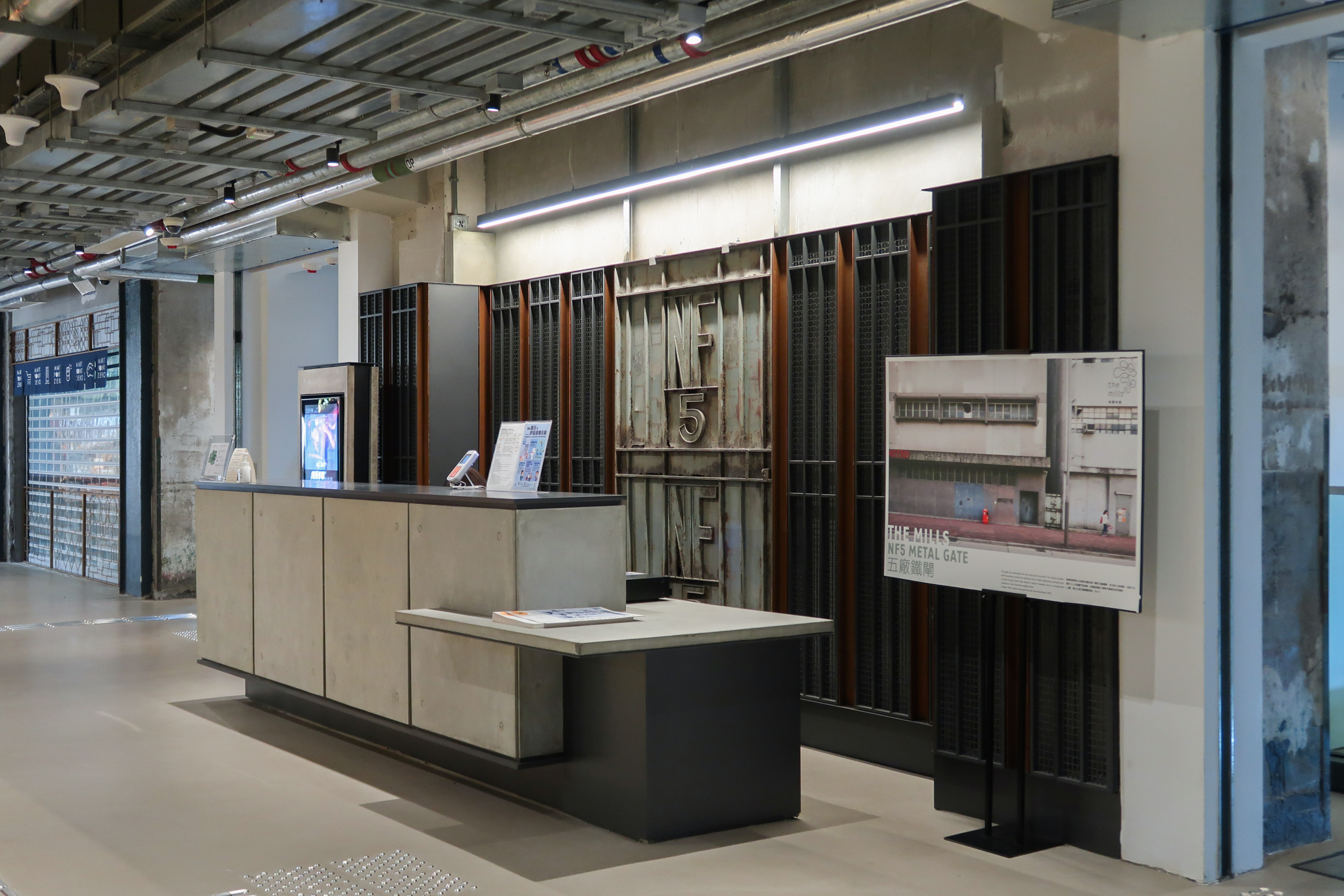
The iron gate of Unit 5, currently located on the 1st floor of Unit 5.

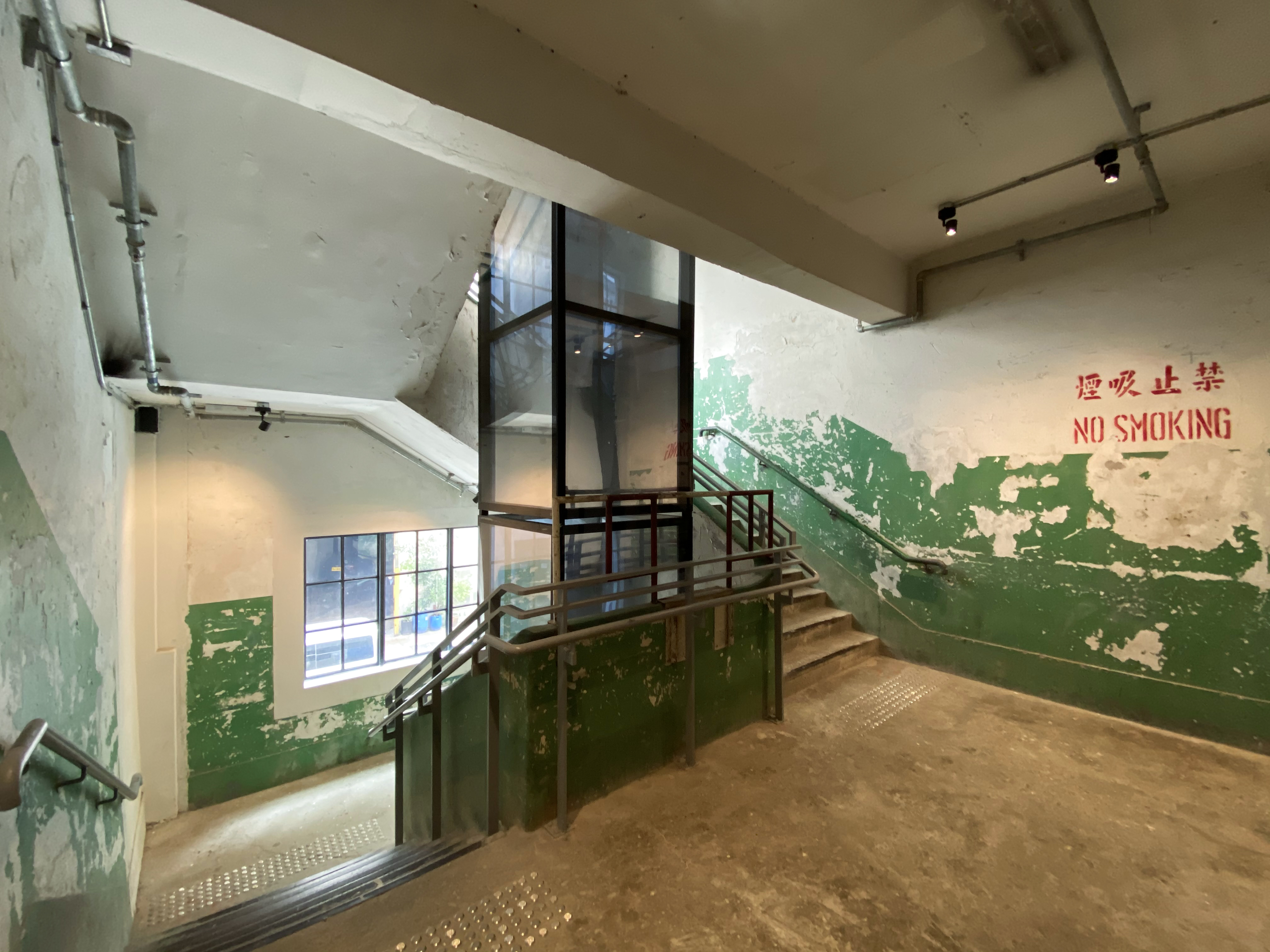
Stairs of Unit 4.

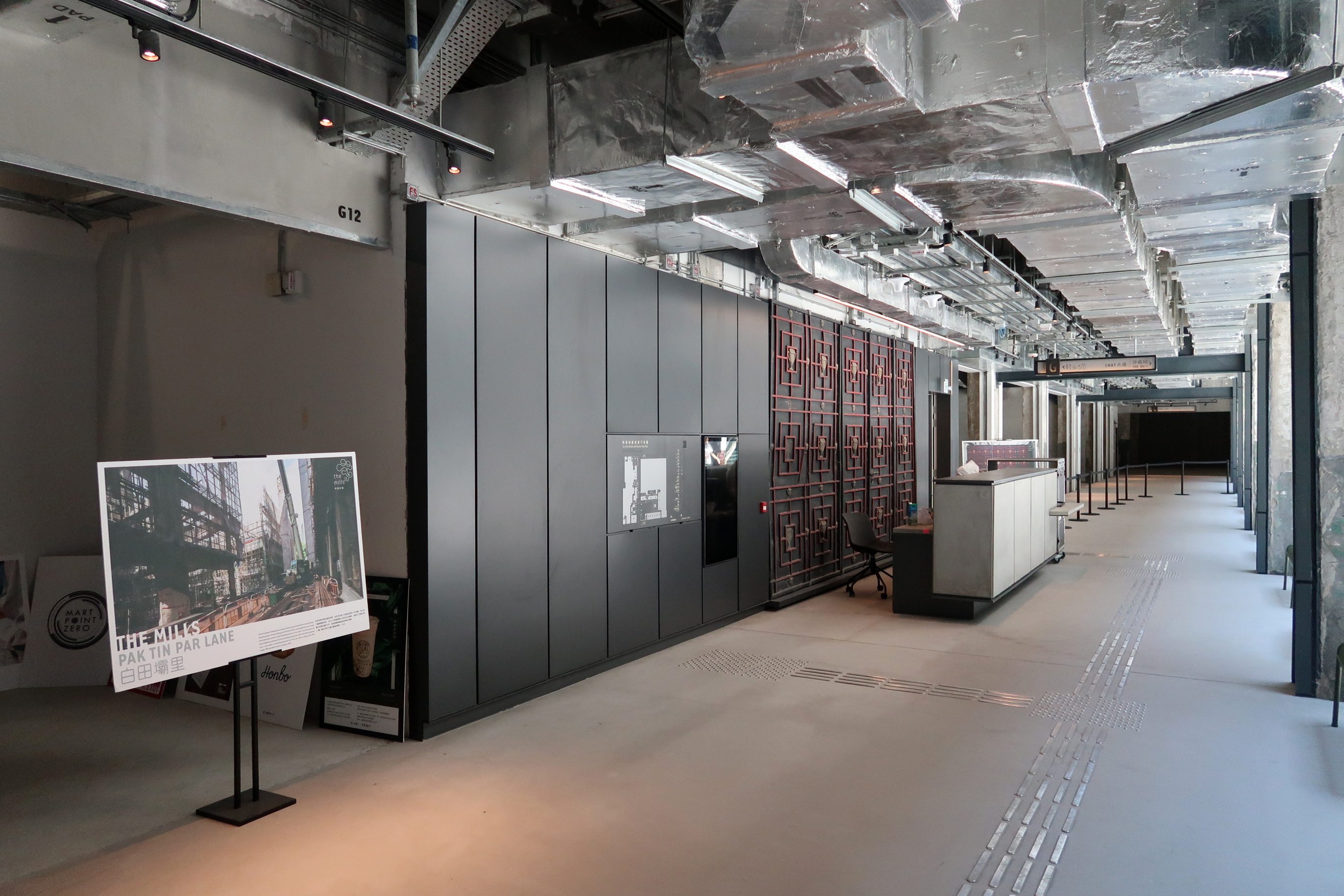
The basement of Unit 6 retains the iron gate with the Nan Fung textile brand "Golden Cup" pattern.

== Facilities ==
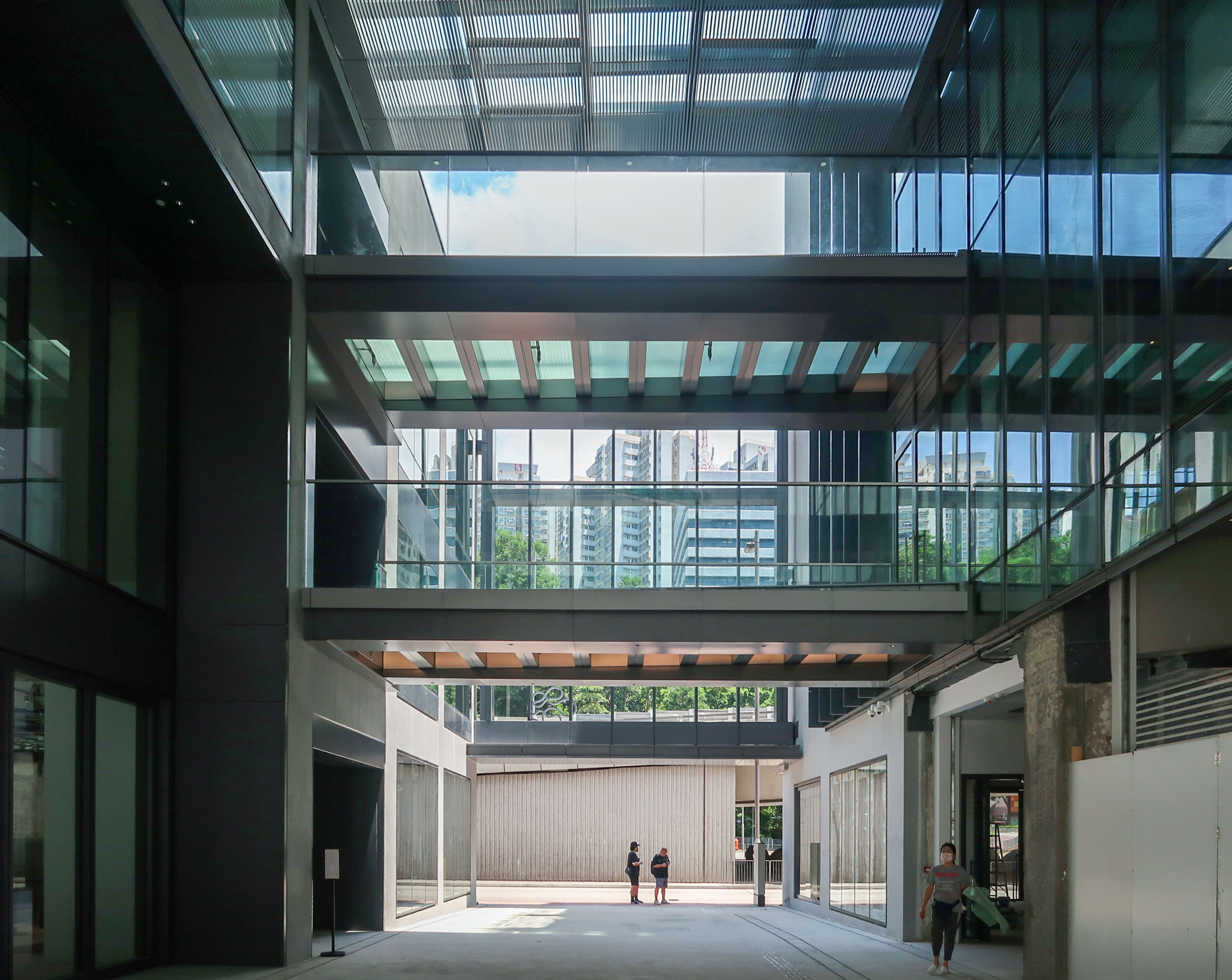
Pedestrian bridges connecting "CHAT Unit 6" and "Nan Fung Studios".

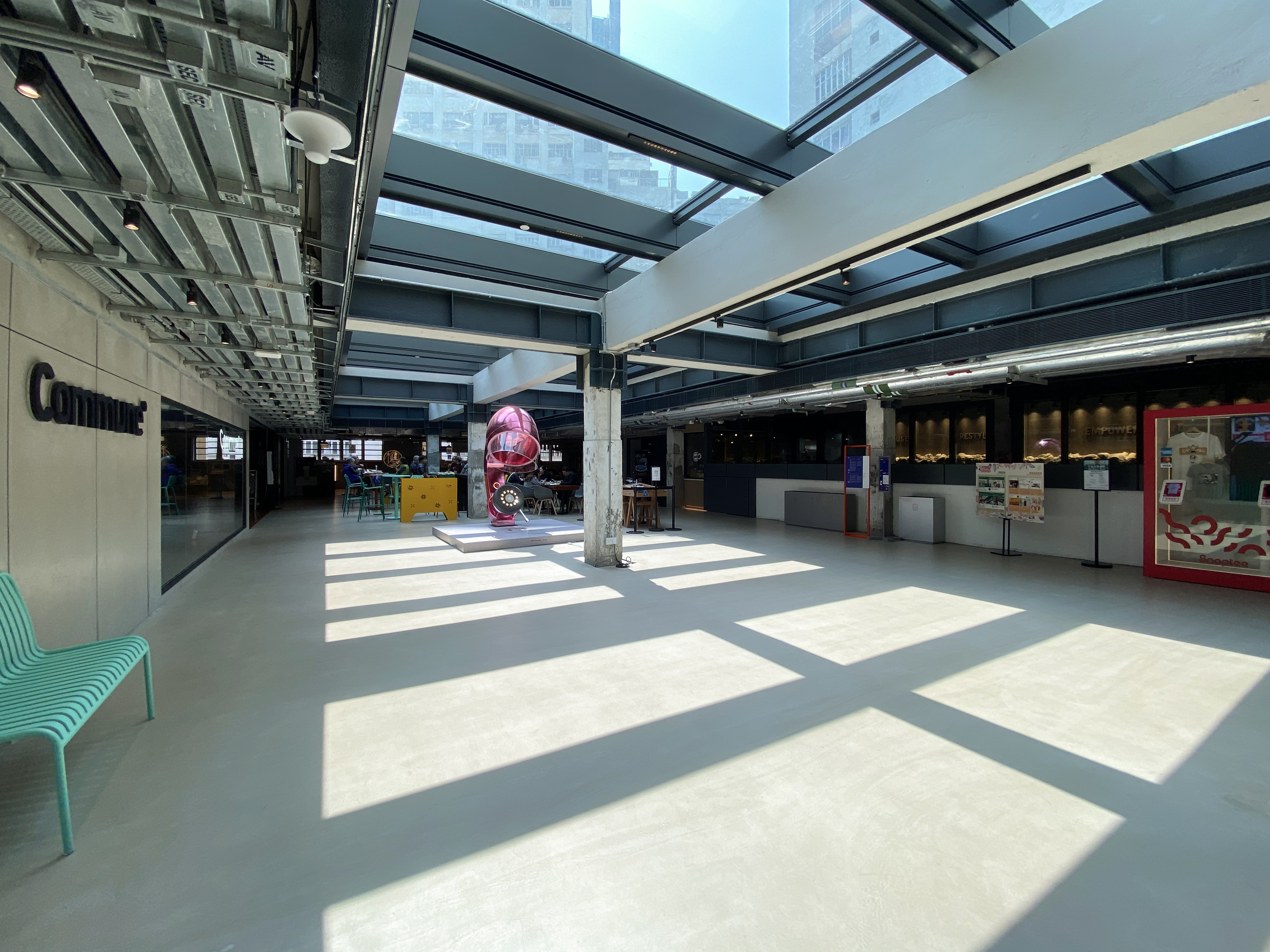
Restaurant on the 1st floor of "Nan Fung Store".

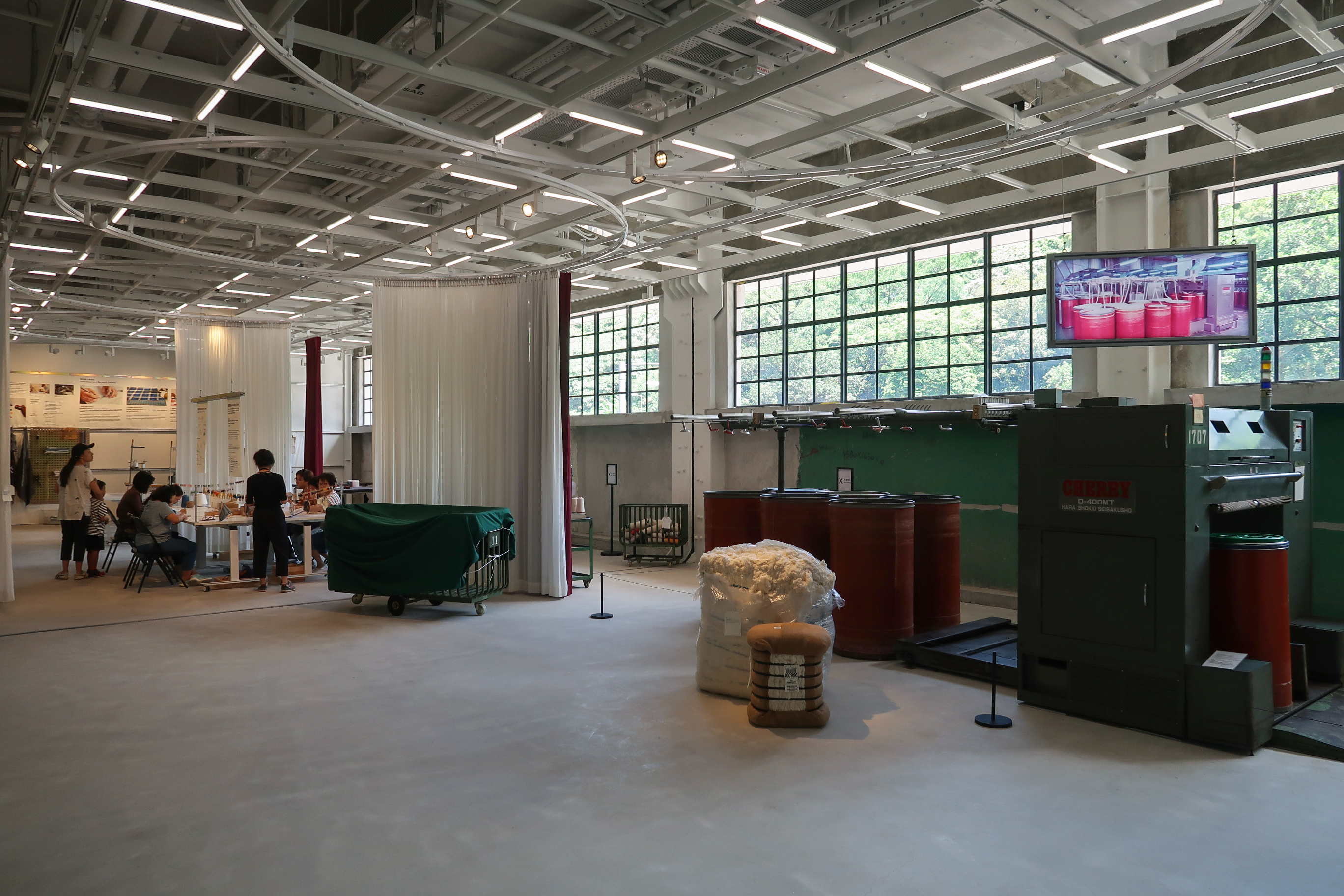
CHAT Unit 6 Foundation Exhibition Hall on the 2nd floor of Unit 6.

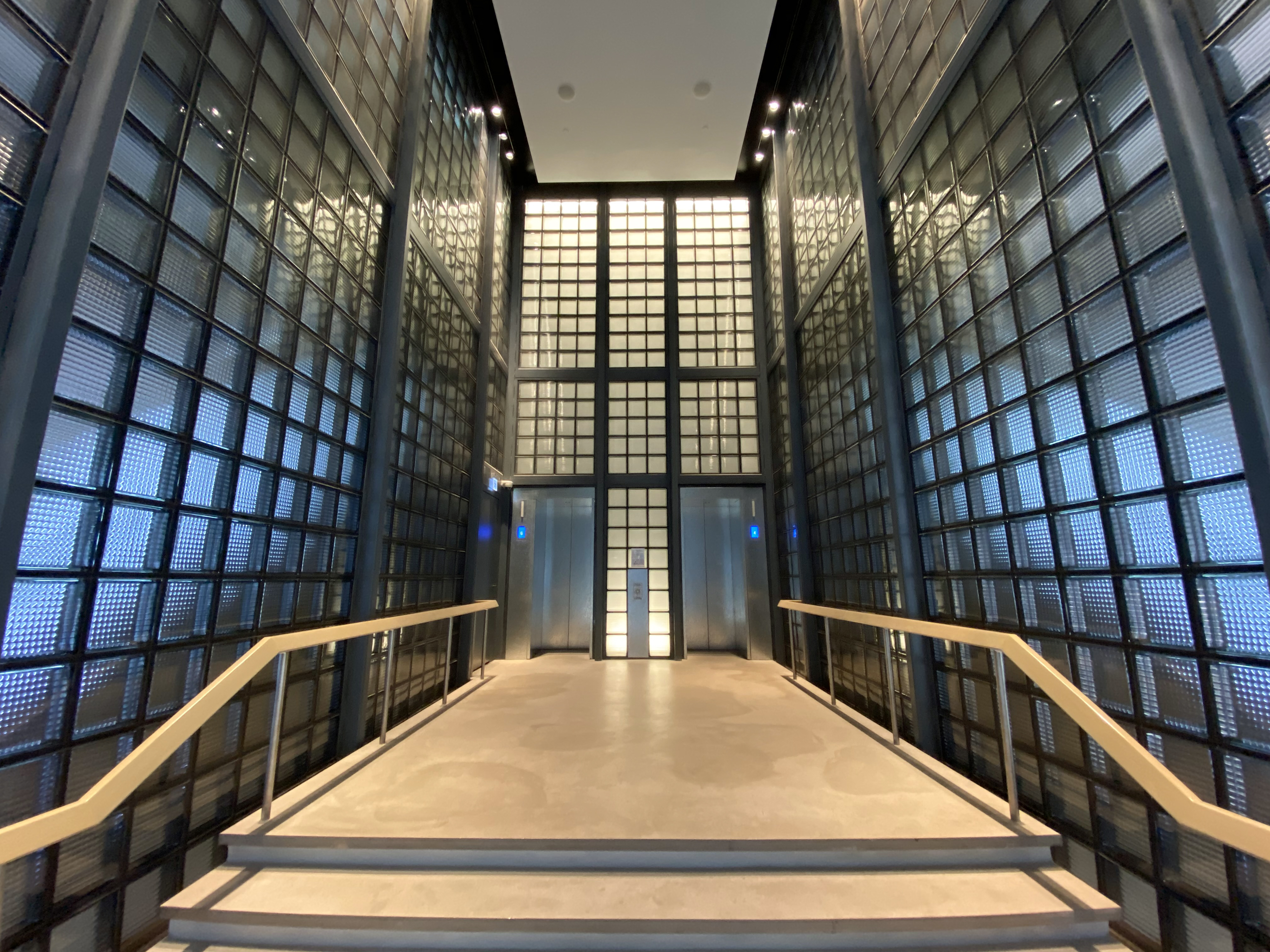
Ground floor lobby of "Nan Fung Studios".

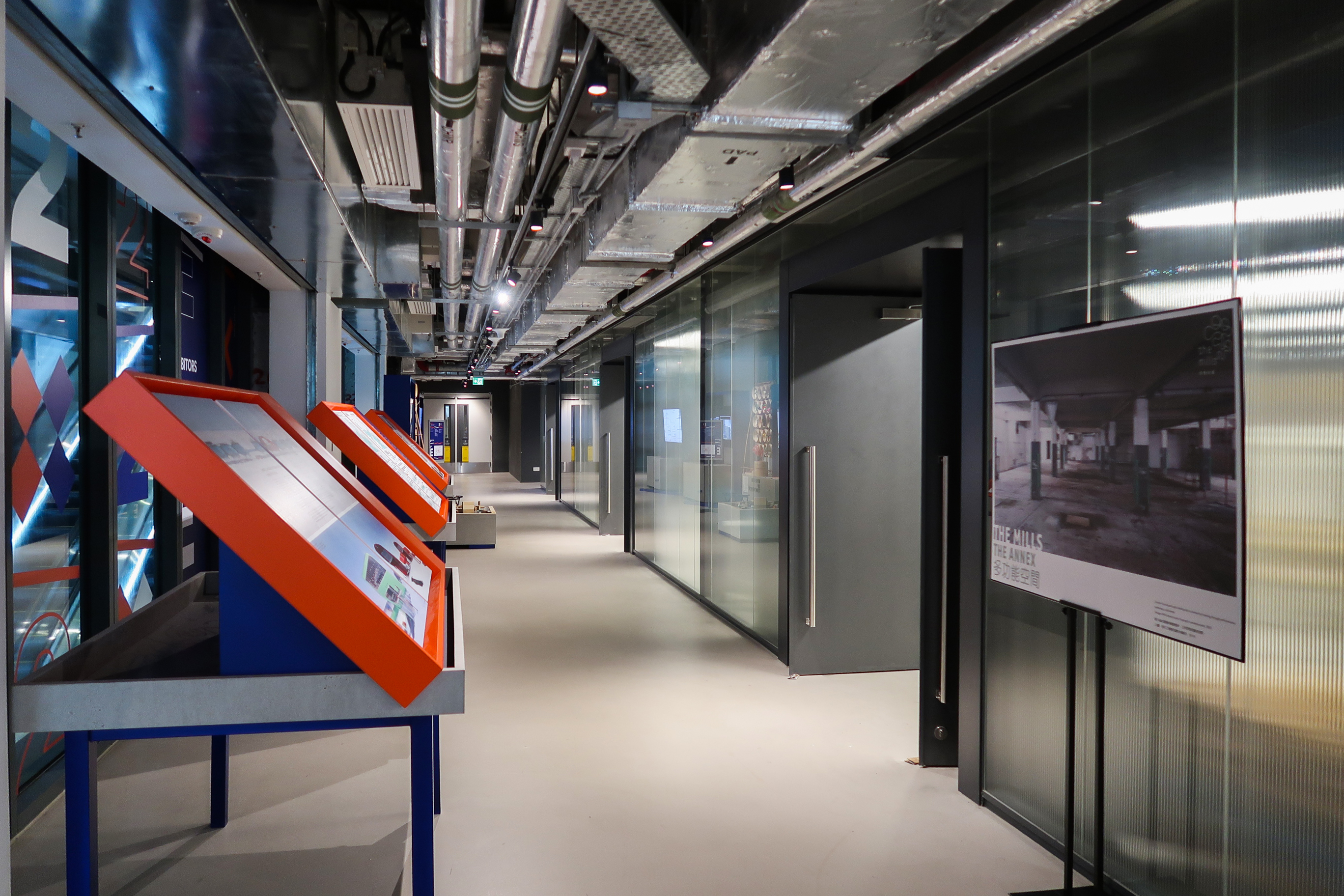
The Annex at The Mills located on Level M of Nan Fung Cotton Mills.

After the completion of the revitalization project in 2018, the three independent buildings of Nan Fung Cotton Mills were transformed into a single architectural complex, divided into three parts: "Nan Fung Studios", "Unit 6 CHAT" and "Nan Fung Store".

=== Nan Fung Studios ===
Nan Fung Studios is a workspace located on the 4th floor of Nan Fung Cotton Mills, serving as an incubation base for entrepreneurs and strategic partners. It opened at the end of 2018. The workspace covers a total area of 15,000 square feet and includes the Nan Fung Studios Lab, operated by the Hong Kong Research Institute of Textiles and Apparel, for prototype production experiments. The atrium space can be used for meetings, seminars, receptions, and other events.

=== CHAT Unit 6 ===
Centre for Heritage, Arts and Textile, located on the 2nd floor, is Hong Kong's first textile culture and art center. It aims to allow visitors to experience the creative spirit of Hong Kong's textile industry in the past and present through activities. It opened to the public on July 28, 2018, and officially opened in March 2019.

=== Nan Fung Store ===
Nan Fung Store is the retail space of Nan Fung Cotton Mills, covering an area of 126,000 square feet. It offers approximately 60 shops and opened at the end of 2018. The tenants inside the venue have unique characteristics that align with the theme of integrating old and new elements of Nan Fung Cotton Mils. Tenants' lease terms range from 1 to 3 years, and shop rents vary depending on the industry.

As of April 2019, operational tenants include furniture stores, fashion boutiques, lifestyle shops, Thai massage parlors, traditional dessert shops, vegetarian restaurants, and local Hong Kong brands focusing on design and products. By May of the same year, a 7,000-square-foot nature-themed family park called The Big Things opened on the 2nd floor, equipped with a restaurant and cooking classroom.

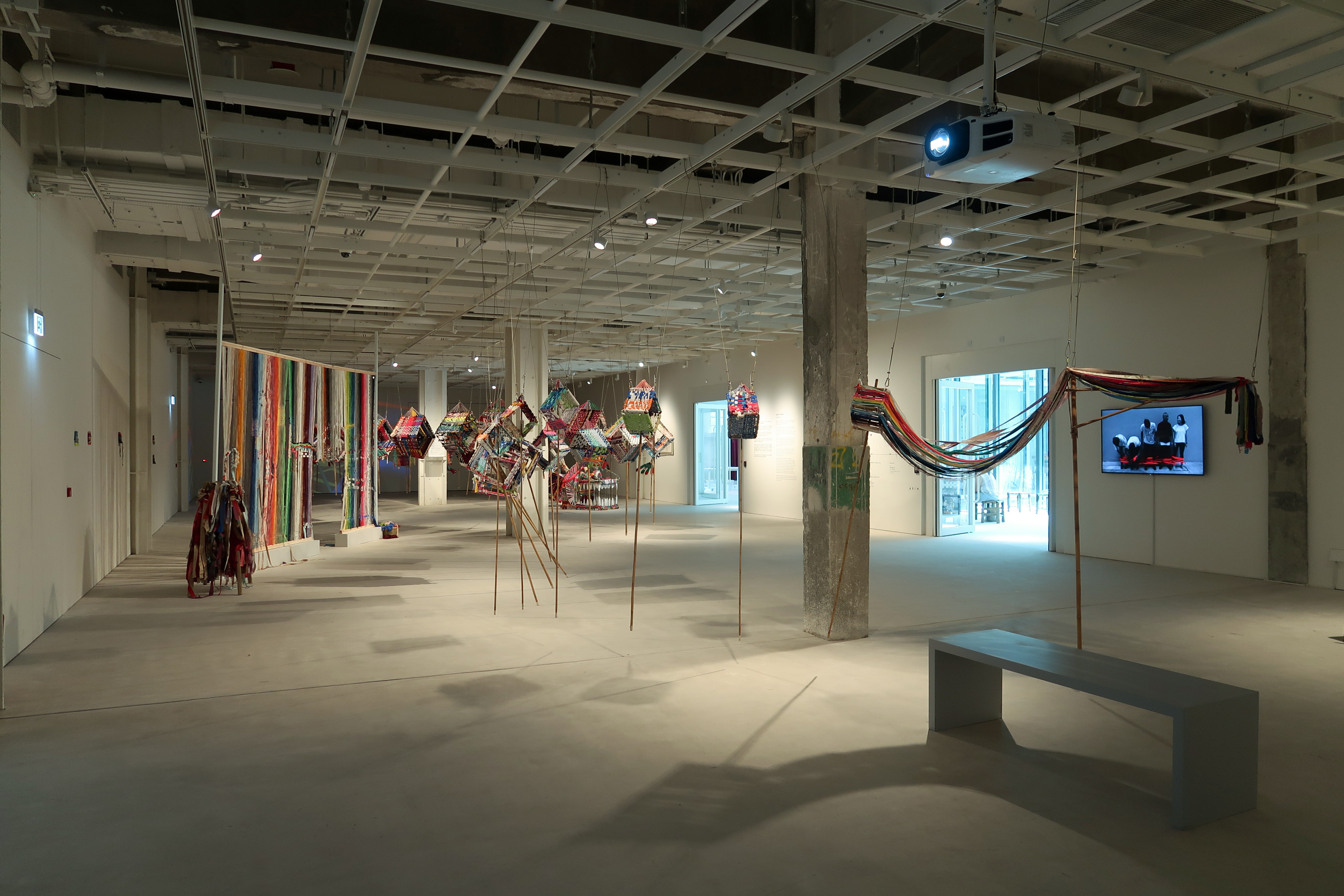
CHAT Unit 6 Exhibition Hall on the 2nd floor of Unit 6.

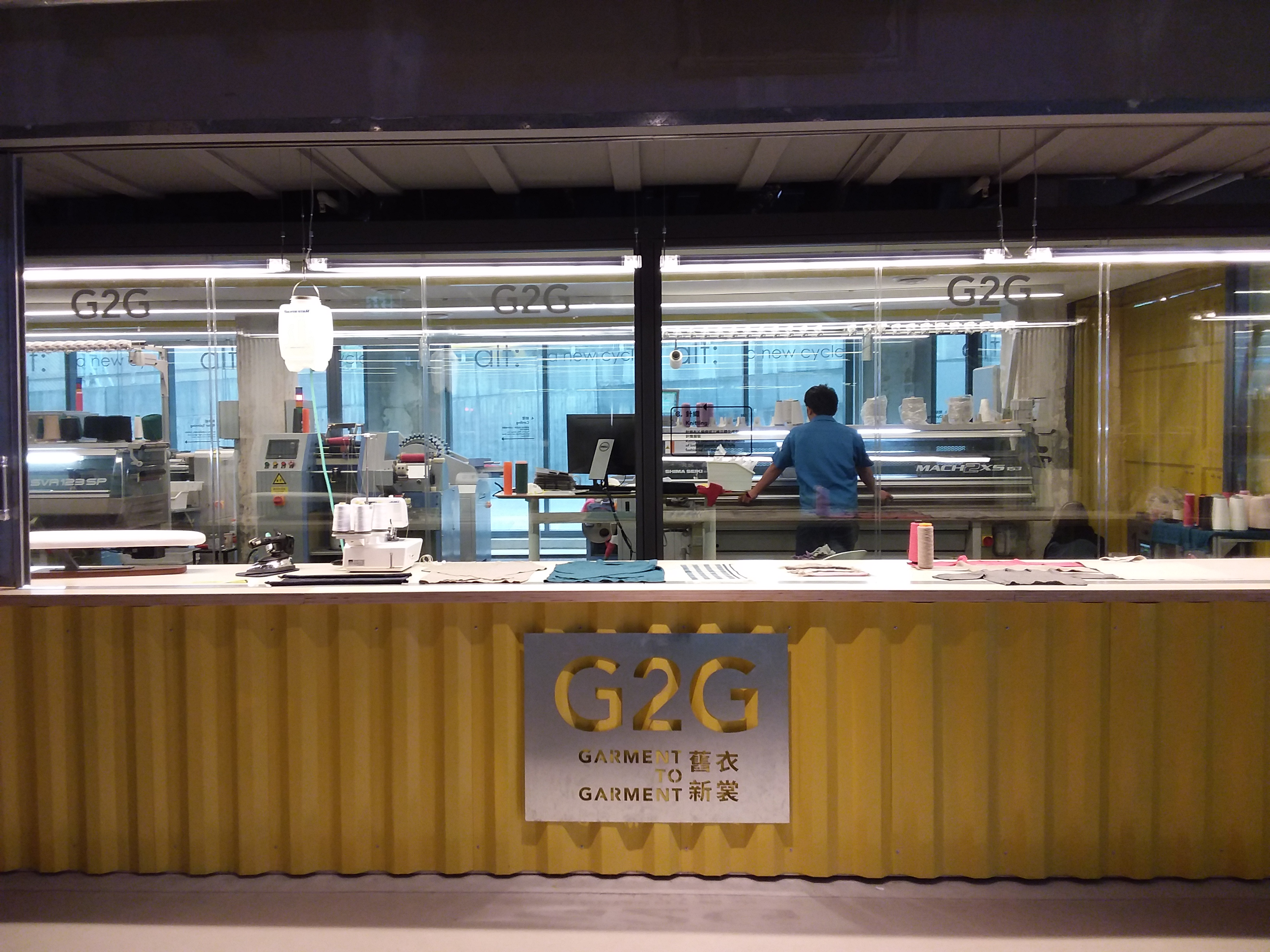
Shop specializing in eco-friendly textile products created using upgraded recycling technologies.

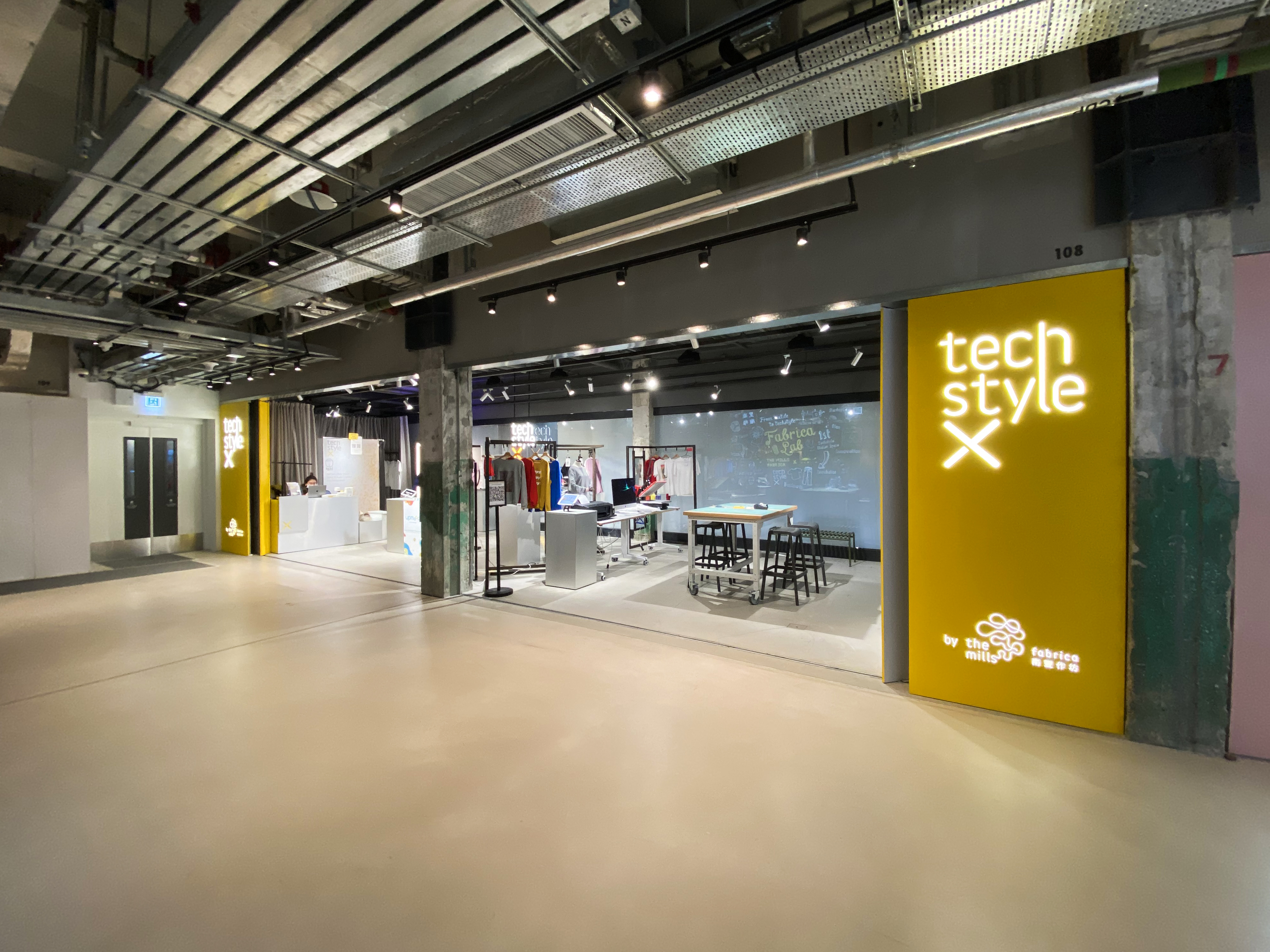
Techstyle X at Nan Fung Studios.

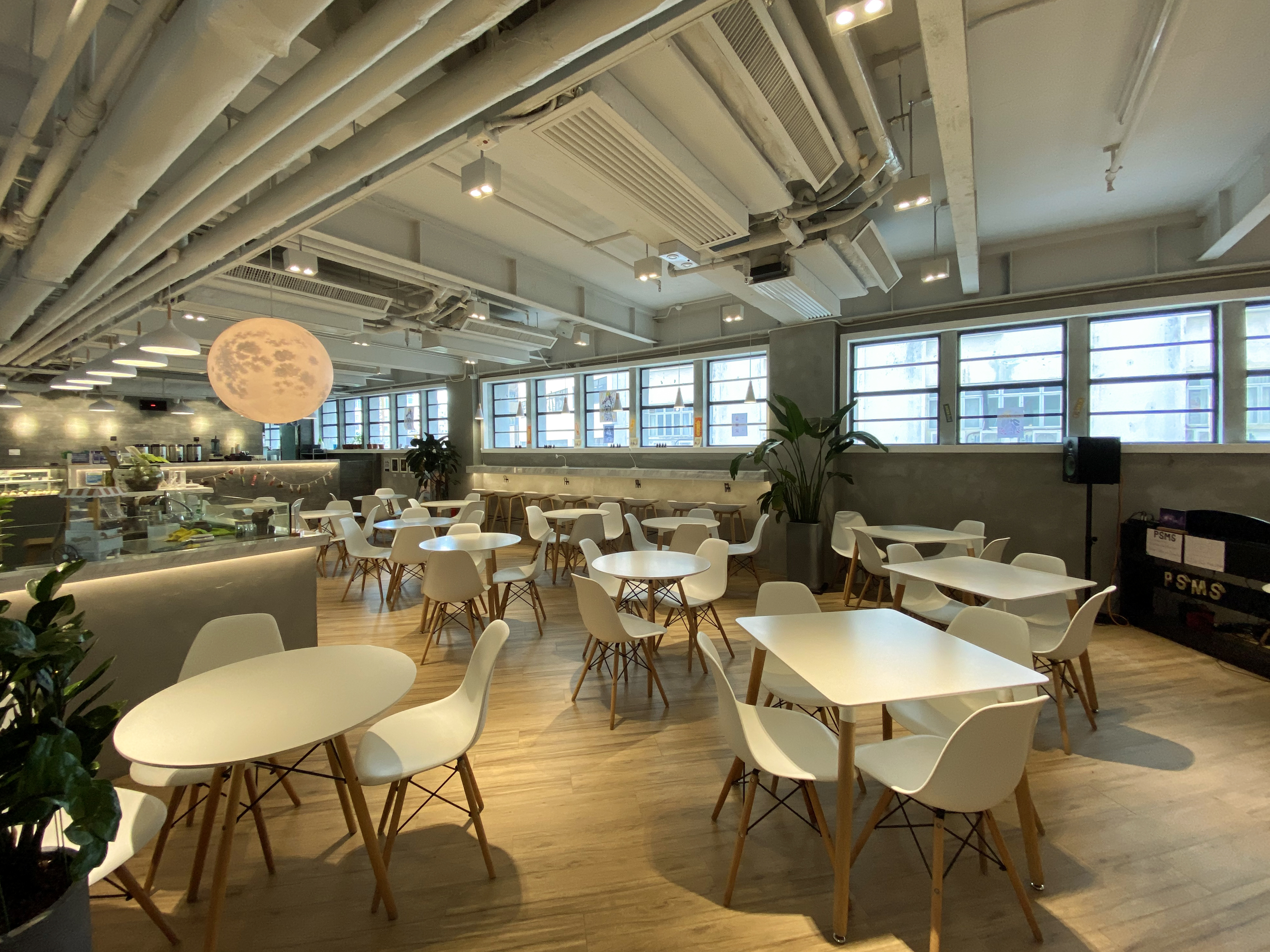
Mu Wei Er Store inside Nan Fung Store.
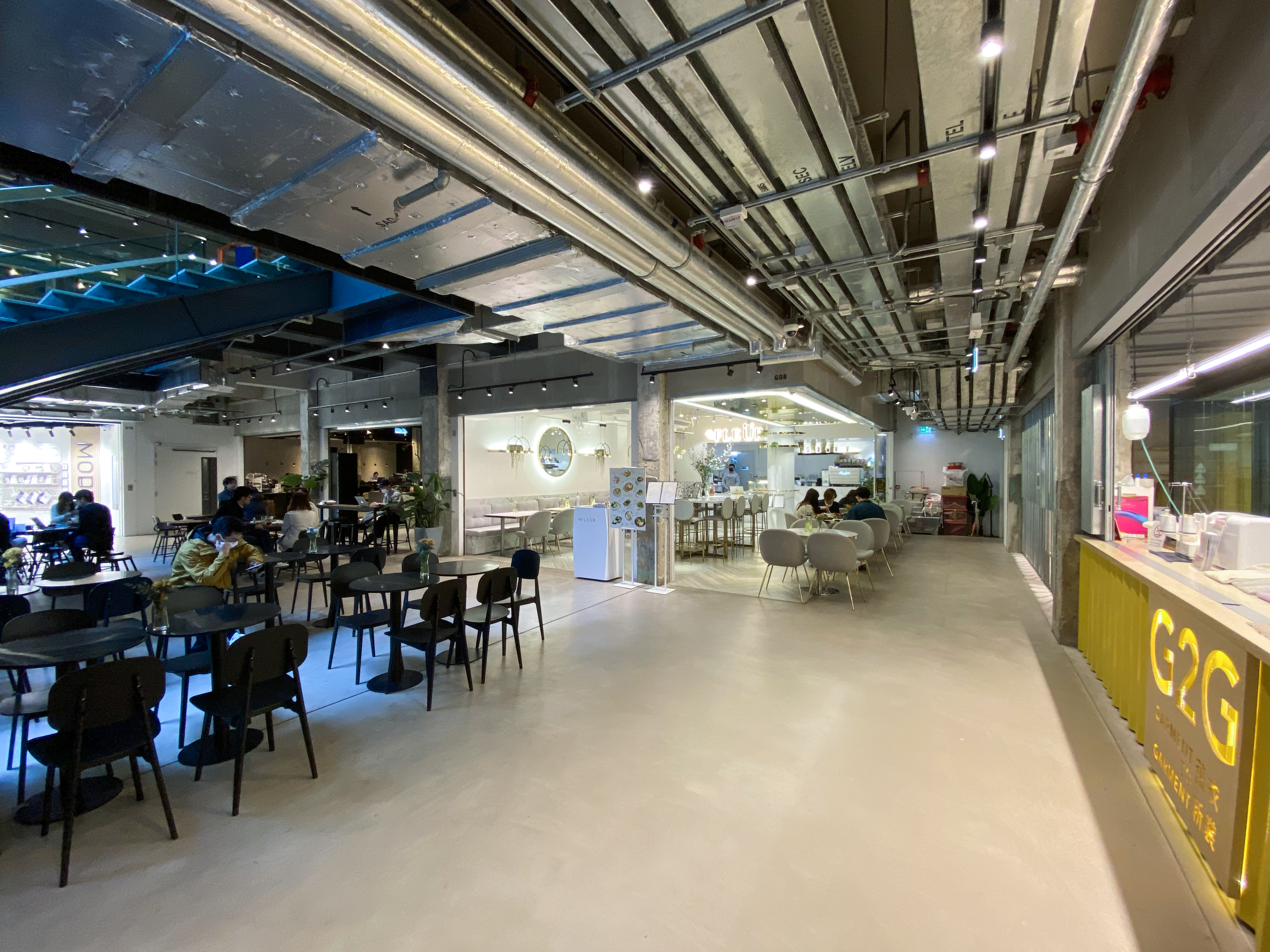
Ground floor restaurant.

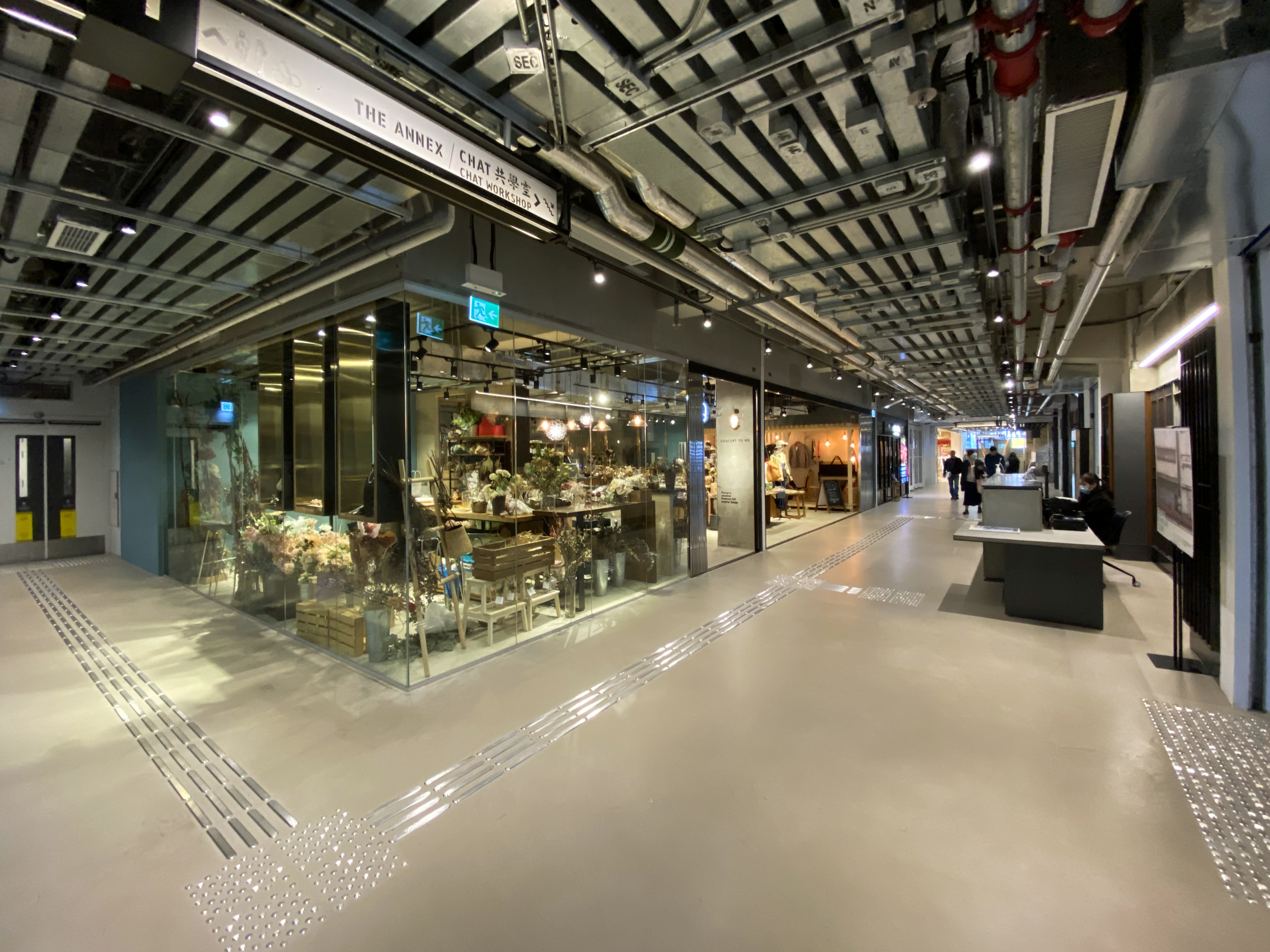
1st floor shops.

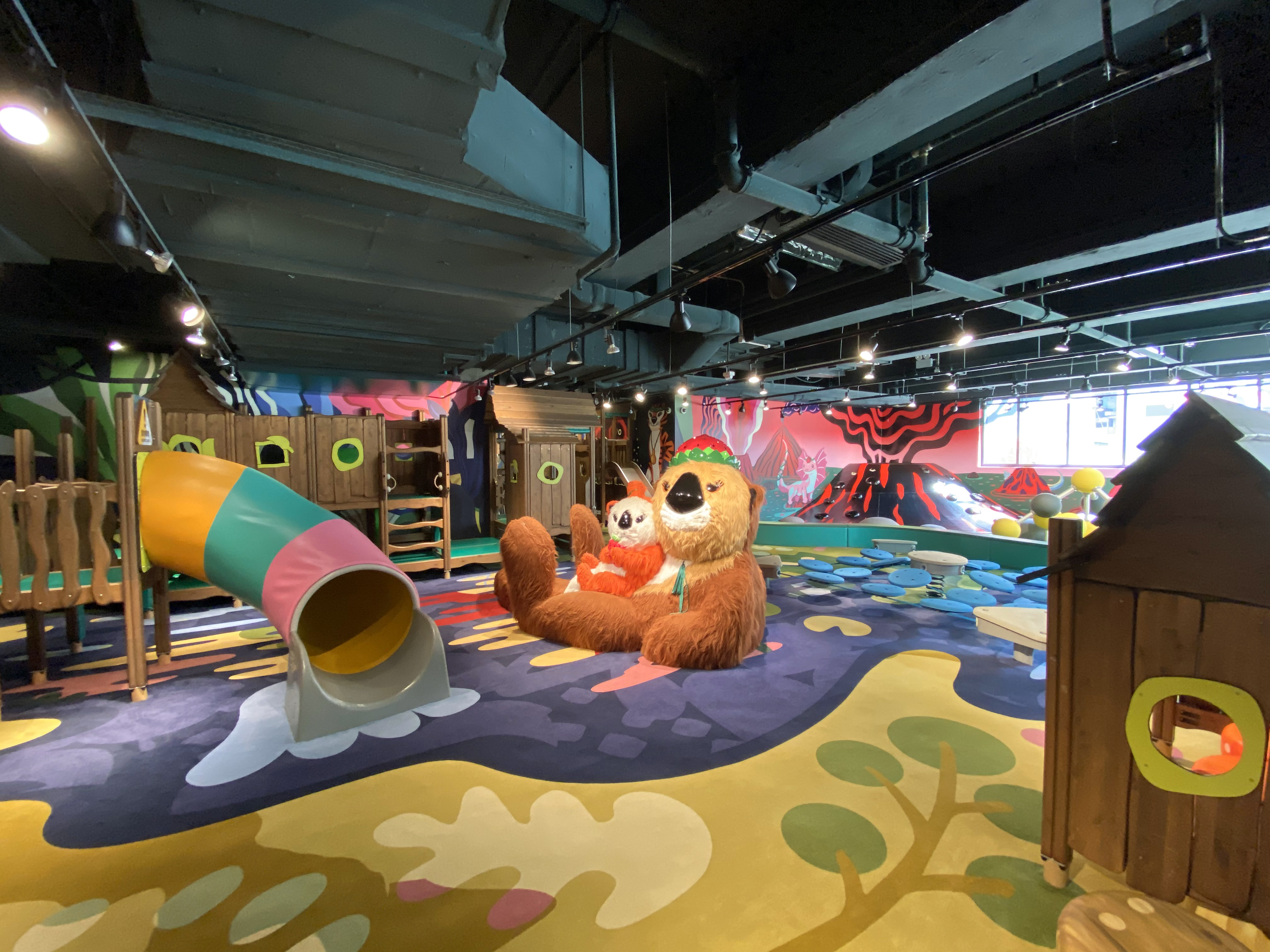
2nd floor nature-themed family park The Big Things.

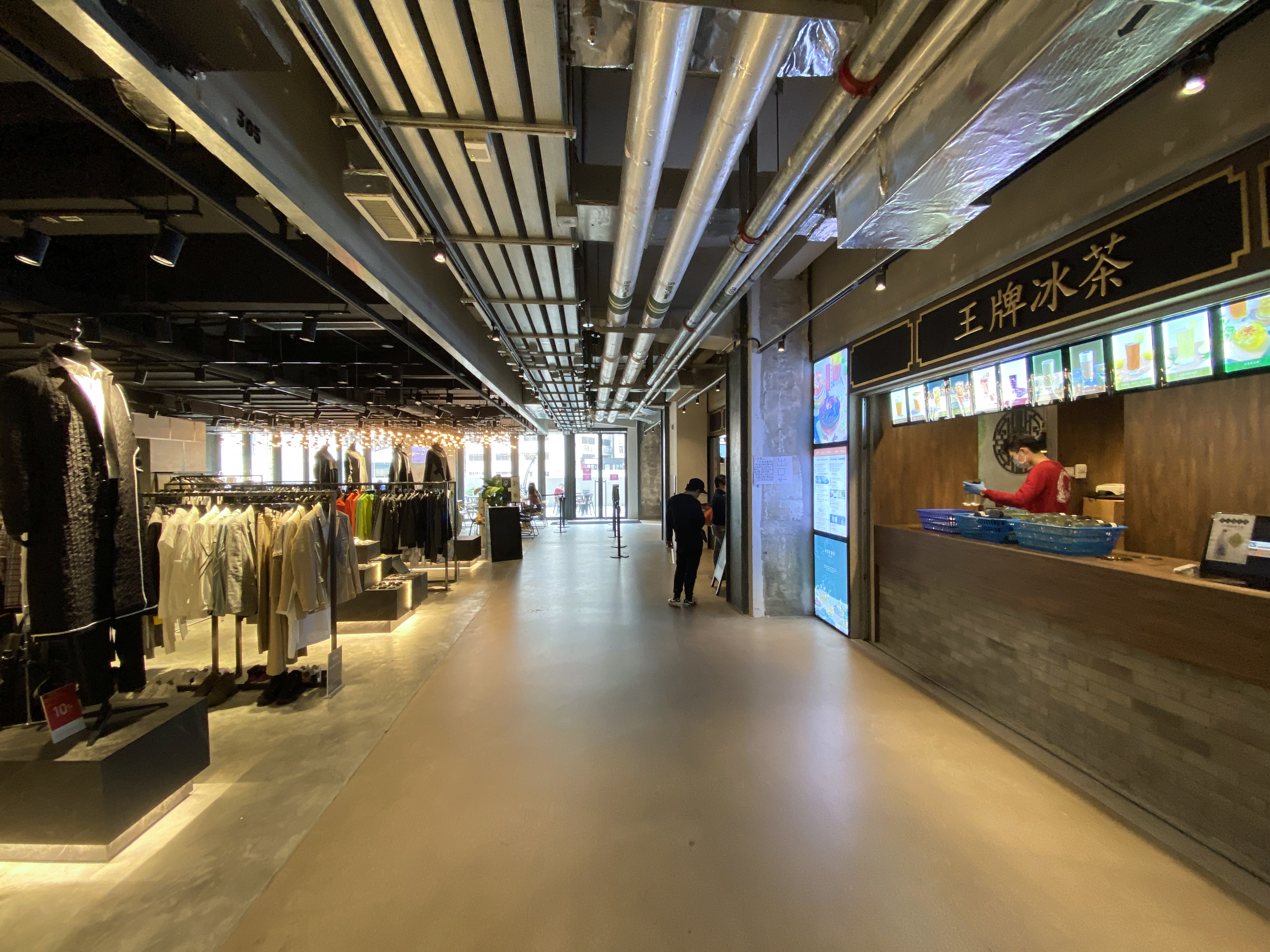
3rd floor shops.

=== The Annex at The Mills ===
The Annex at The Mills is located on Level M of Nan Fung Cotton Mills, with a total usable area of 3,348 square feet. It can be used for meetings, seminars, lectures, and training courses. One of the rooms is equipped with movable soundproof walls, which can be divided into up to 3 rooms.

=== Outdoor spaces ===
In addition, the rooftops of Units 6 and 4 have been transformed into "Cotton Mill Park" and "Cotton Mill Farmland", respectively, while the private alley between Units 6 and 5 has been widened into a public space called "Pak Tin Par". Cotton Mills Park, created from the rooftop of Unit 6, allows visitors to enjoy the view of Nan Fung Cotton Mills. Inside the park is a large-scale art piece called "Traces of Weaving" approximately 4 meters by 23 meters, created by Lam Tung Pang and COLLECTIVE. The artwork tells the story of fabric.

Cotton Mills Farmland is located on the rooftop of Unit 4 and is available for rent for crop planting. Pak Tin Par space is created by widening the private alley between Units 6 and 5. Murals created by six local artists line the alley, depicting the past, present, and future of Nan Fung Cotton Mills. Adjacent to the alley entrance of Nan Fung Cotton Mills is a giant portrait painting titled "Nameles Heroes," created by Portuguese artist Alexandre Farto, symbolizing the memories of the previous generation of Hong Kong's struggles and paying tribute to former textile industry workers.

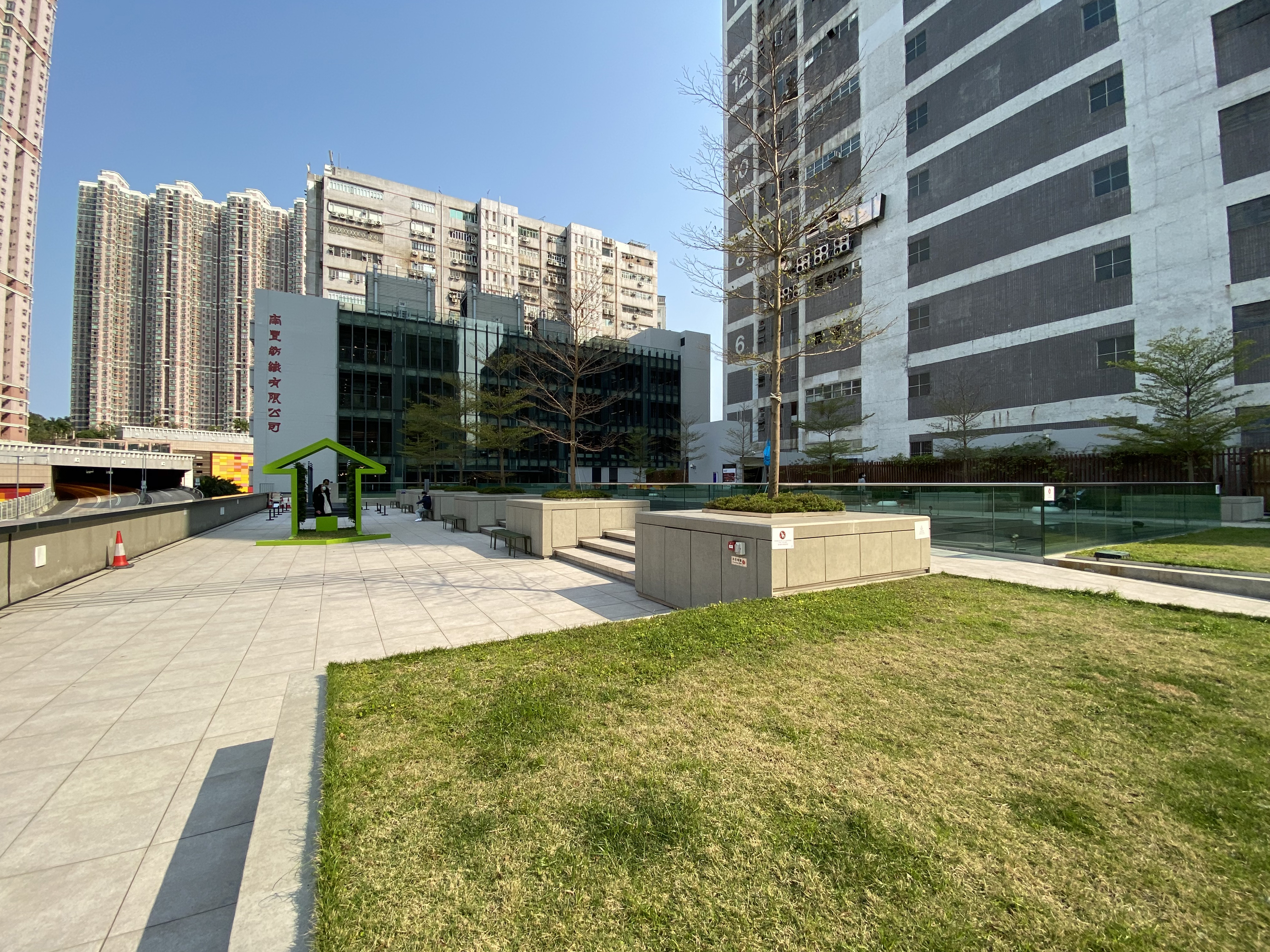
Rooftop of the Cotton Mills Park of Unit 6, Nan Fung Cotton Mills.

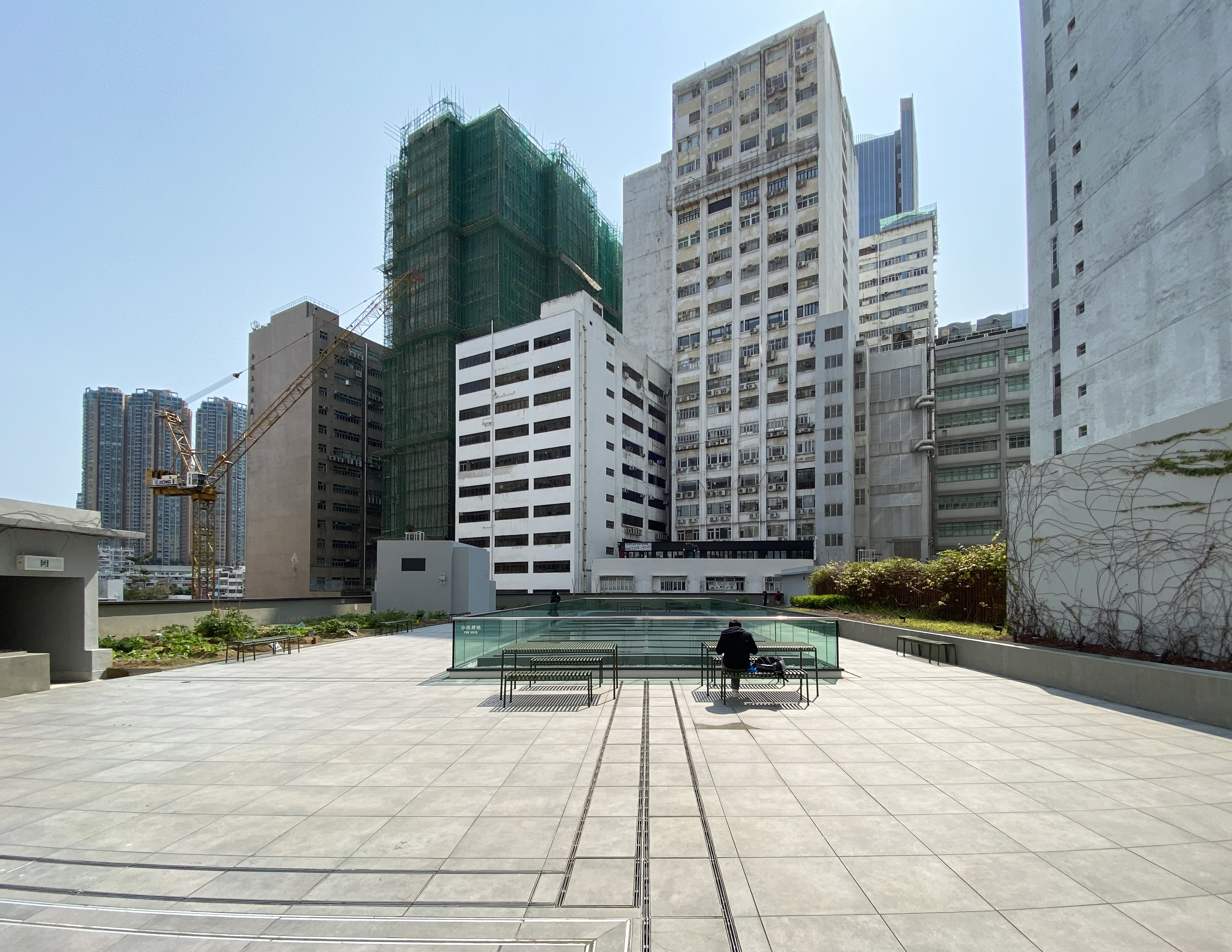
Rooftop Cotton Mills Farmland of Unit 4.

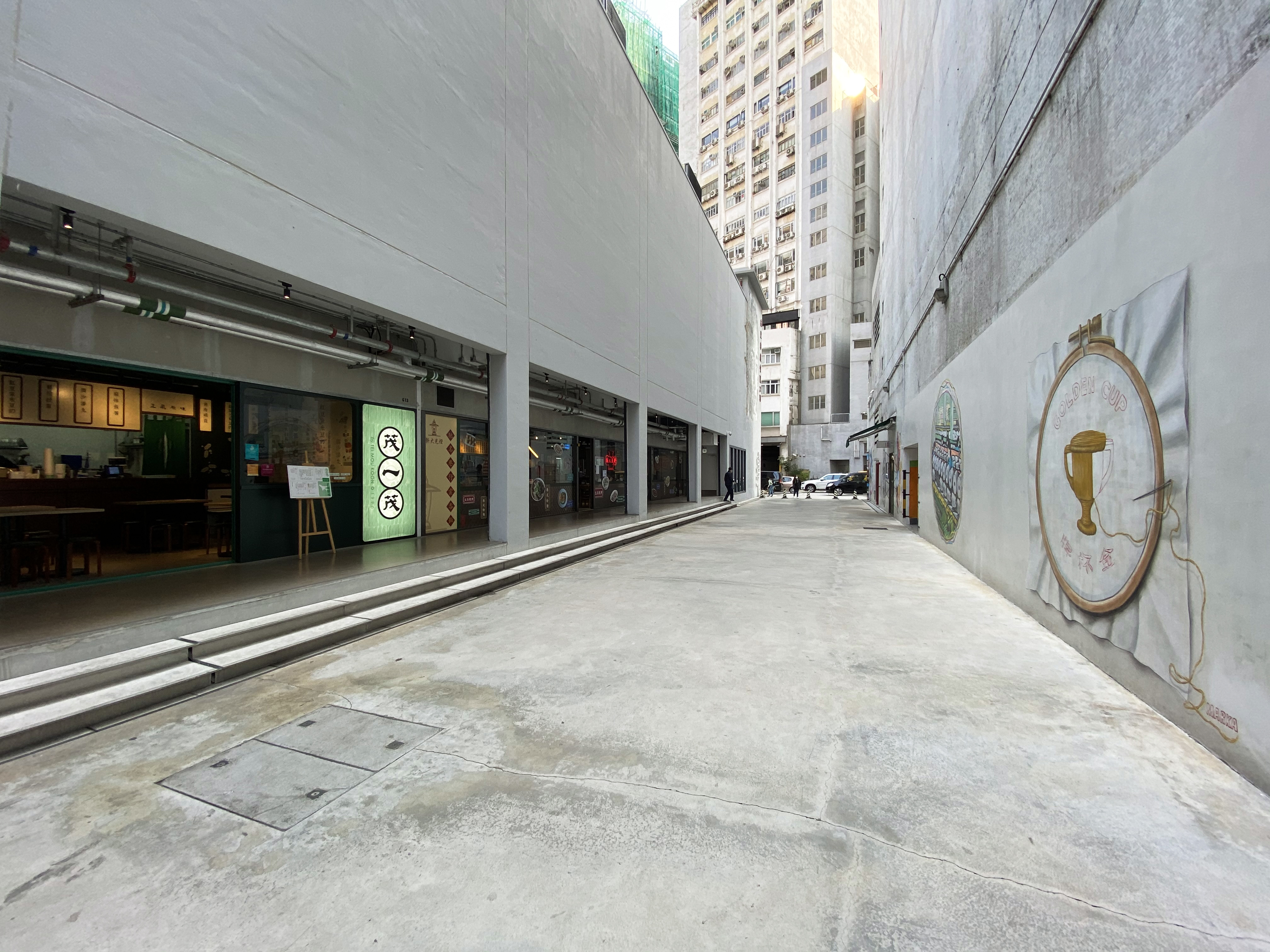
Murals after the revitalization of Pak Tin Par.

=== Interior decorations ===
After revitalization, Nan Fung Cotton Mills adopts a "Cultural and Creative x Historical x Industrial style", becoming a cultural and creative space in the Tsuen Wan community and a new landmark in Tsuen Wan. During revitalization, Nan Fung Cotton Mills specially invited renowned engraver Wu Ding Keung to create some engraving templates for the textile factory, which became signage for the factory. The bright red tools called "Tai Ping Bucket" formerly used for fire rescue, together with discarded wooden door panels from the factory, became decorations for the signage inside Nan Fung Cotton Mills. Apart from showcasing the past of the textile factory, it also prevents historical artifacts from being wasted or discarded. The white checkered brick wall outside the restroom of Nan Fung Cotton Mills has become a popular spot for photography.

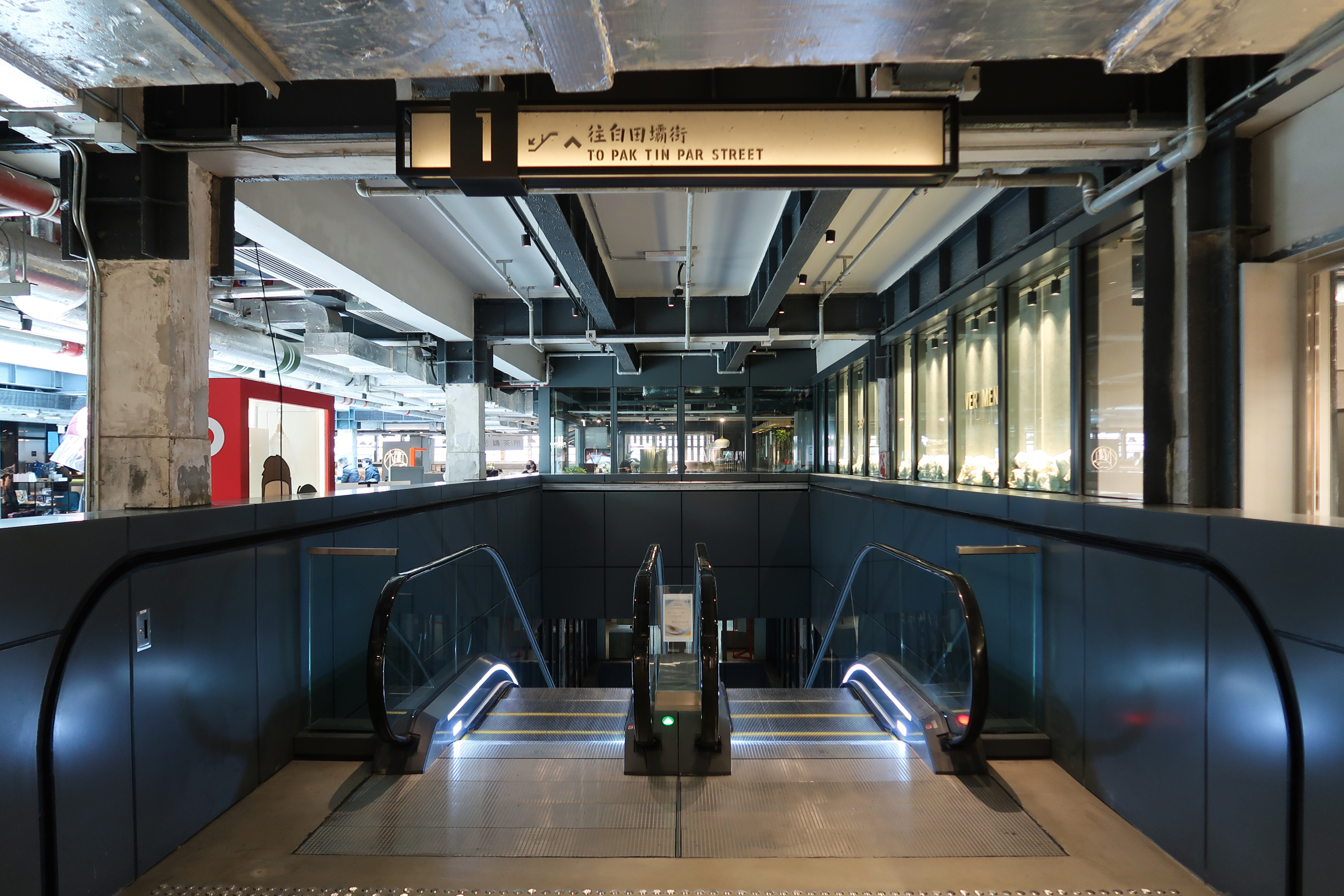
Engraved signage in front of the escalator.

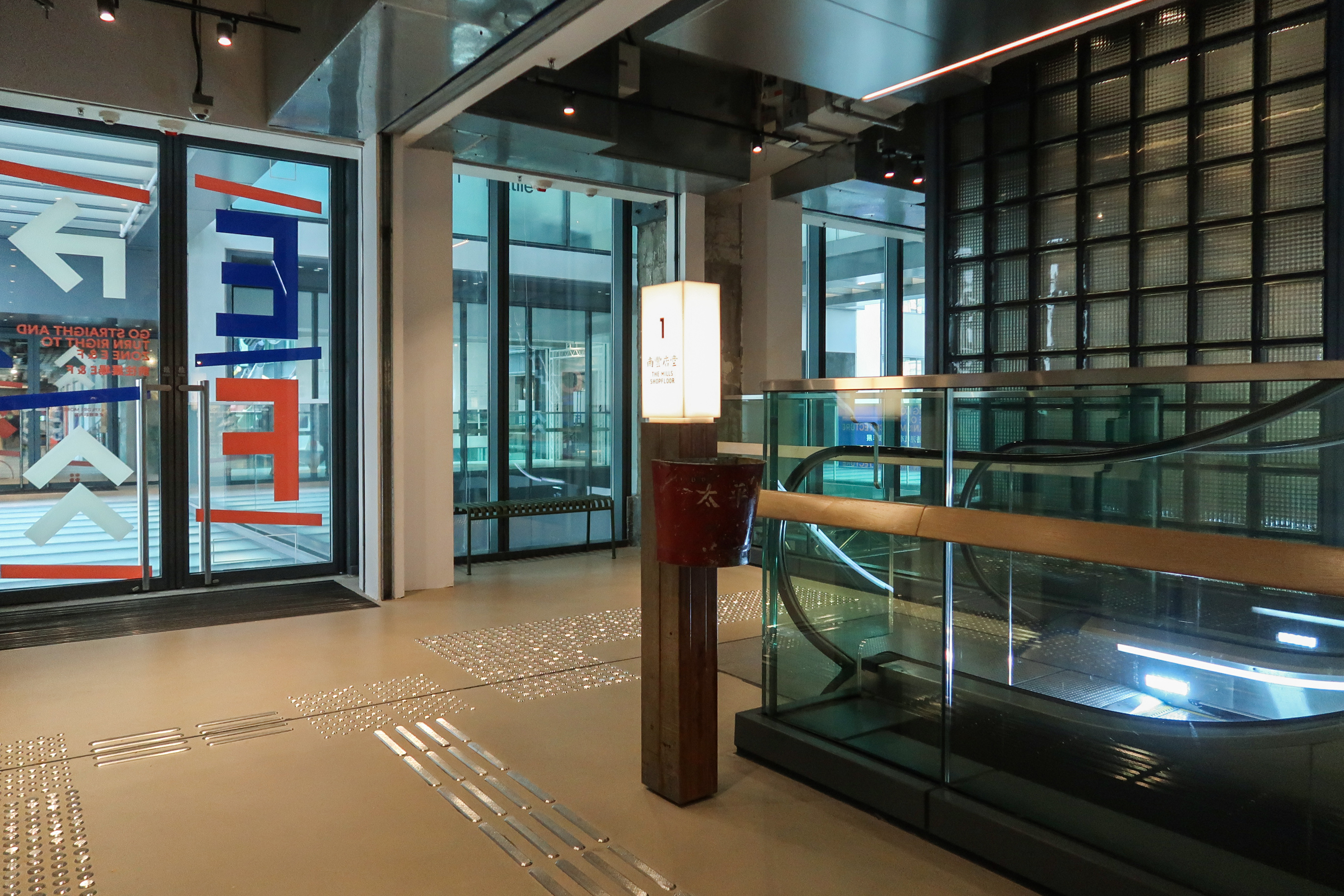
Tai Ping Bucket under the signage.

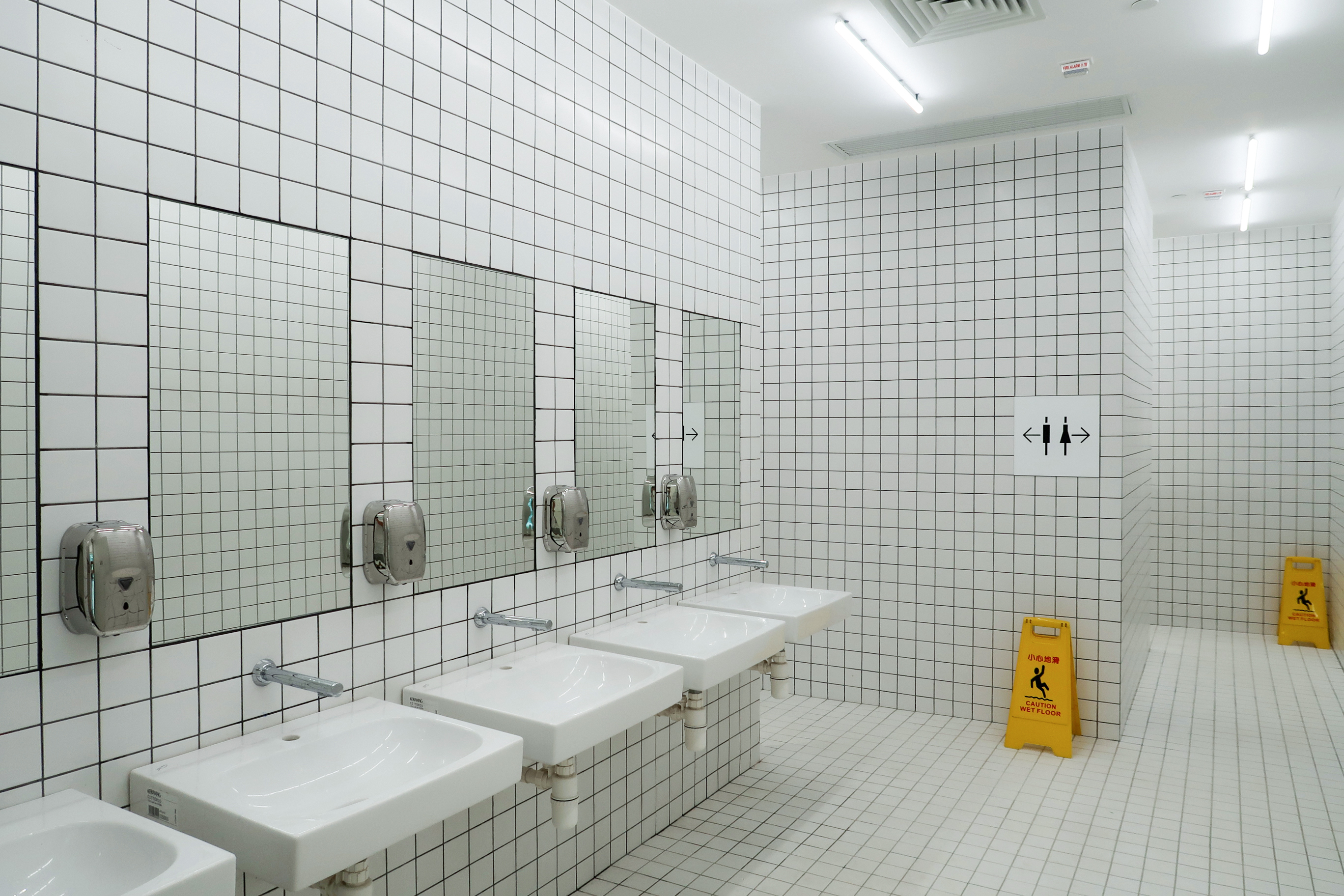
Restroom with white checkered brick walls, a popular spot for photography.

== Controversy ==
On the evening of May 6, 2020, Carrie Lam, the then Chief Executive of Hong Kong, posted a photo on her Facebook page, indicating that she had visited one of the mask production points. As the background of the photo matched that of Nan Fung Cotton Mills, the mask production point was thus identified as Nan Fung Cotton Mills. Subsequently, a reporter from HK01 visited the shared space on the 4th floor of Nan Fung Cotton Mills and found that one of the workspaces had been set up as a production workshop for copper-core anti-epidemic masks. Several staff and security guards then expelled the reporter, and the room was sealed with plywood.

Later, Ming Pao checked the revitalization deed of Nan Fung Cotton Mills in 2018 and found that although Unit 4 and 5 factories where the masks were made could be used for research institutes, design and development centers, training centers, recreational, sports, and cultural activities, shops, and catering services, they could not be used for "industrial purposes". Therefore, manufacturing masks there was suspected of violating the deed. Ming Pao also checked the relevant lease, which stated that Nan Fung Cotton Mills (No. 2) Co., Ltd. leased the Unit 4 and 5 factories to Nan Fung Workshop Incubation Center Ltd. for HK$120,000 per month, and it was stipulated that the Unit 4 and 5 factories could only be used for research institutes, design and development centers, training centers, or for leisure, sports, and cultural purposes, and not for other purposes. Land and construction lawyer Tse Tin Leung believed that the textile factory could only produce small samples, and large-scale production might violate the deed.

== Transportation ==
Nan Fung Cotton Mills provides a shuttle service with red minibuses, shuttling between Nan Fung Cotton Mills and MTR Tsuen Wan Station. It officially commenced service on December 1, 2019. The waiting area at Tsuen Wan Station is located opposite the Tsuen Wan Government Office near Exit A4 of Tsuen Wan Station, while the waiting area at Nan Fung Cotton Mills is located inside the parking lot. The shuttle runs every 20 minutes, and the service is free of charge. The appearance of Nan Fung Cotton Mills minibuses is different from ordinary minibuses. The body of the minibus bears the name and logo of Nan Fung Cotton Mills, and the front of the minibus has traditional minibus stop signs indicating "Free" and "Come over, see things, buy things, eat things". (Note: It is written as "過嚟、睇嘢、買嘢、食嘢" in Cantonese.)

In addition, as Nan Fung Cotton Mills is located in the industrial area of Pak Tin Par Street in Tsuen Wan, visitors can reach Nan Fung Cotton Mills via the pedestrian footbridge from Exit A3 of Tsuen Wan Station or along Tai Chung Road from Exit A2 of Tsuen Wan West Station. Moreover, there are many bus and minibus routes passing by the Castle Peak Road - Tsuen Wan opposite Nan Fung Cotton Mills. Visitors can take the relevant transportation and alight near Nan Fung Cotton Mills (such as at Tsuen King Circuit Footbridge Bus Stop) and then walk to the destination.

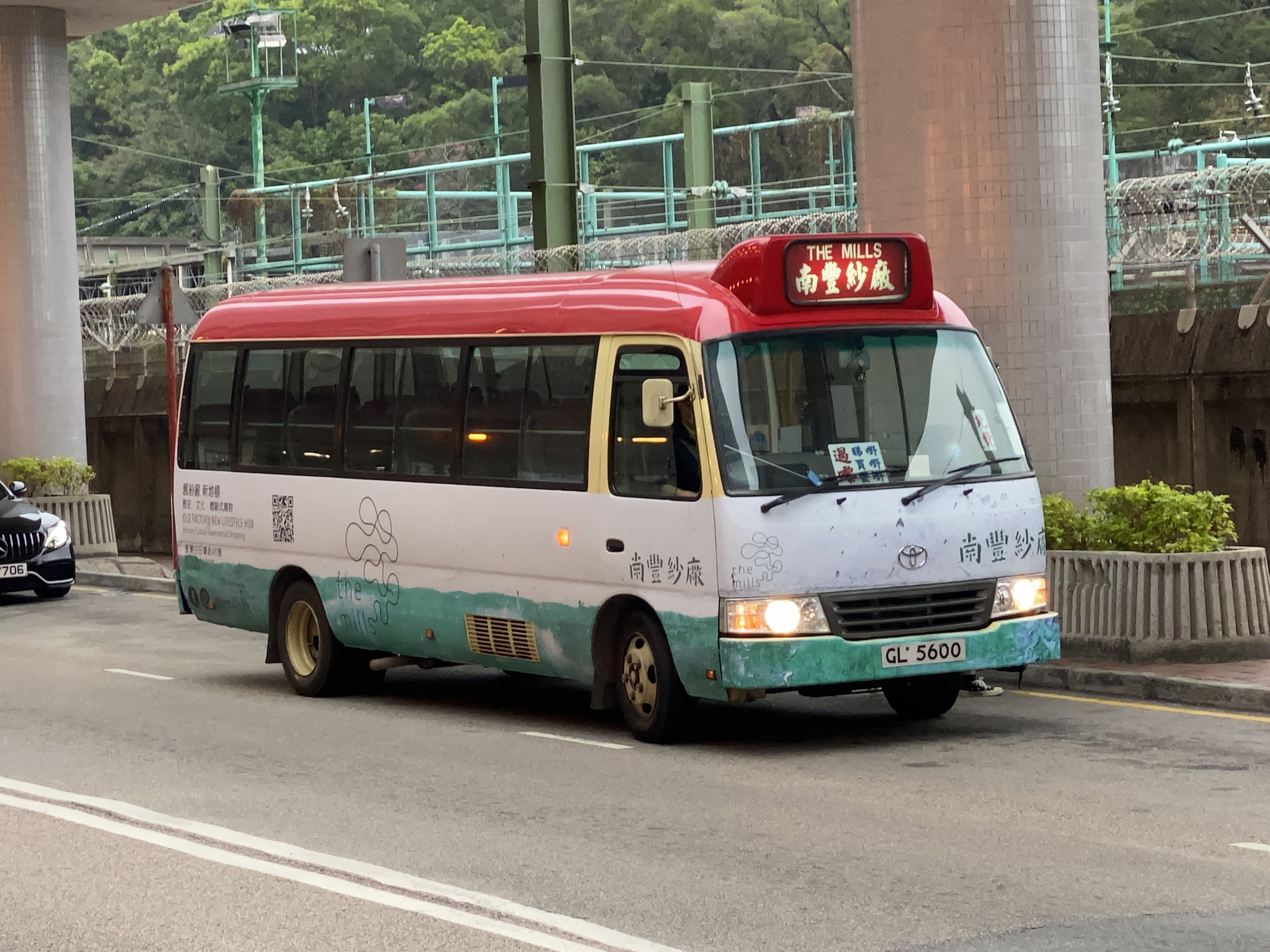
Red minibuses shuttle between Nan Fung Cotton Mills and MTR Tsuen Wan Station, stopping at the waiting area opposite the Tsuen Wan Government Office near Exit A4 of Tsuen Wan Station.

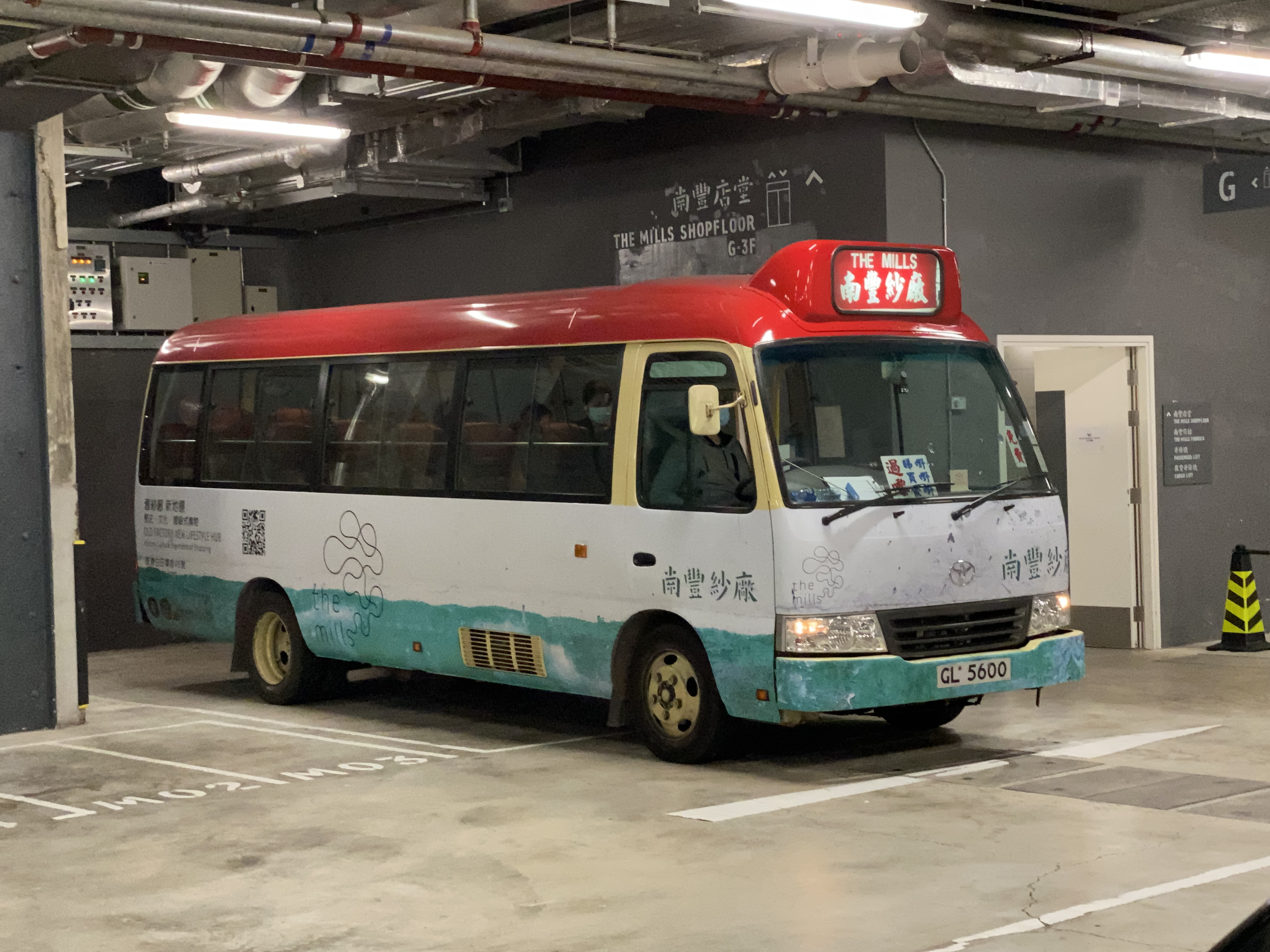
Red minibuses shuttle between Nan Fung Cotton Mills and MTR Tsuen Wan Station, stopping at the waiting area inside Nan Fung Cotton Mills' parking lot.

== Awards ==
During and after the revitalization project, Nan Fung Cotton Mills received the following awards:

- 2015 Hong Kong Institute of Planners Annual Award.
- LEED Gold Certification for Leadership in Energy and Environmental Design.
- Construction Industry Council Sustainable Building Award.
- MIPIM Asia Awards 2018 – Bronze Award for Best Renovated Building.

== See also ==
- Footbridge Network in Tsuen Wan
