= Mono Pass =

Mountain pass near Yosemite National Park in California

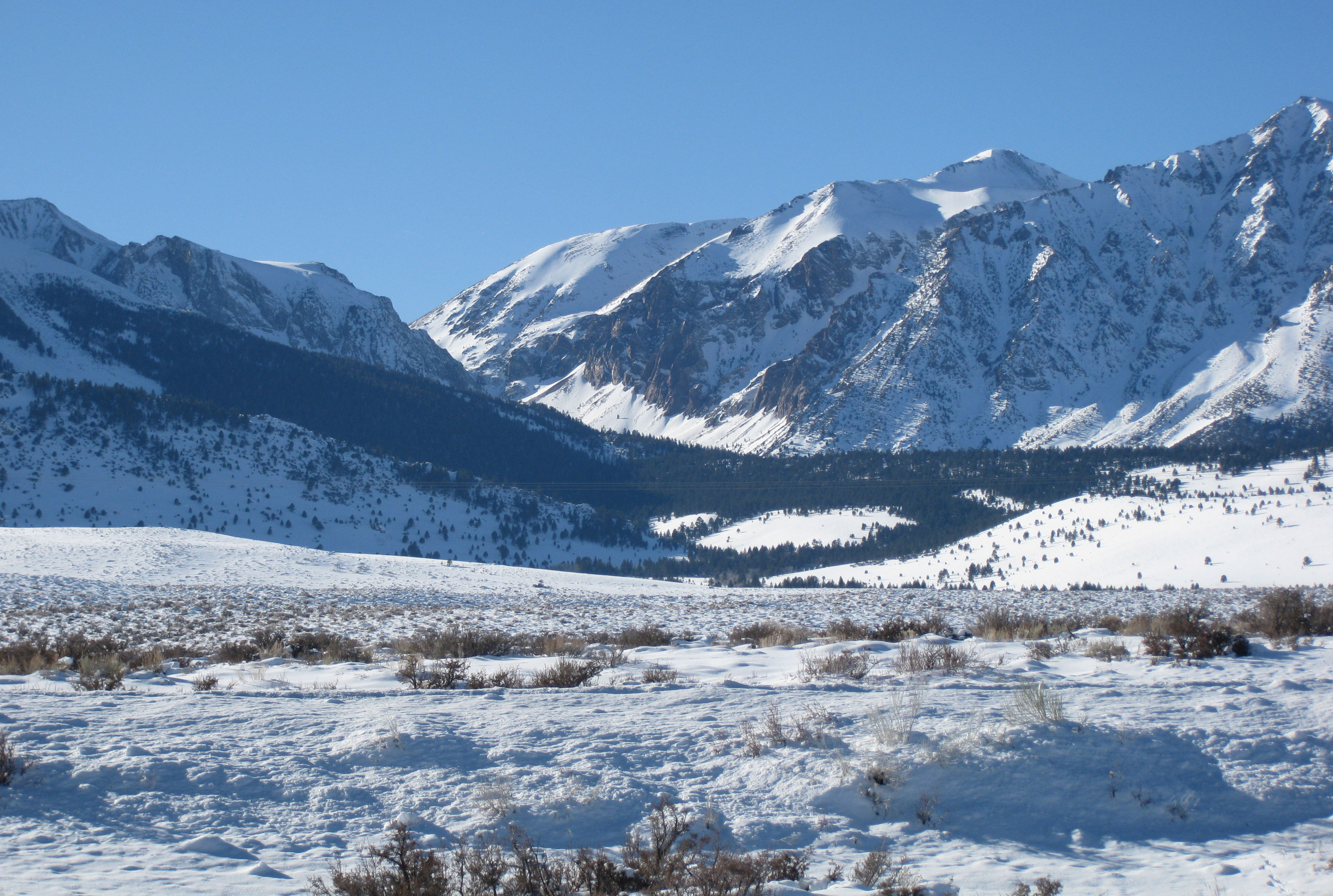
- Mono Pass, winter, from the east
- Interactive map of Mono Pass
- Elevation: 3,230 m (10,600 ft)

Third Approach
- Location: Yosemite National Park, border
- Range: Sierra Nevada
- Coordinates: 37°51′19.2″N 119°12′47.9″W

Mono Pass is a mountain pass, just outside Yosemite National Park, near the region of Tuolumne Meadows. Mono Pass is between Mount Gibbs and Mount Lewis.

There is another pass also named Mono less than 40 miles away in the Rock Creek/Little Lakes Valley area. Both Mono Passes are in the Inyo National Forest. The Mono Pass in the Rock Creek/Little Lakes Valley area is accessed by the Mosquito Flats Trailhead rather than the Mono Pass Trailhead in Yosemite National Park.

Mono Pass is on the Great Basin Divide, which demarcates the Great Basin. The latter is the largest area in North America from which waters don't drain towards an ocean. Tioga Pass, the east entrance to the national park on highway 120, 4.5 miles north-northwest, is likewise on the Great Basin Divide.

== Native history ==
When only Native Americans lived in the area, and for a time after, a major trading trail went over Mono Pass and through Bloody Canyon to Mono Lake, just to the east of the Yosemite area.

== The location of Mono Pass ==
Mono Pass is just outside of Yosemite National Park, The trailhead for the trail to the pass is on Tioga Road (CA hwy 120) 1.4 miles (2.3 km) south of the entrance, inside the park. This trail is 4 miles each way, elevation gain 1130'.

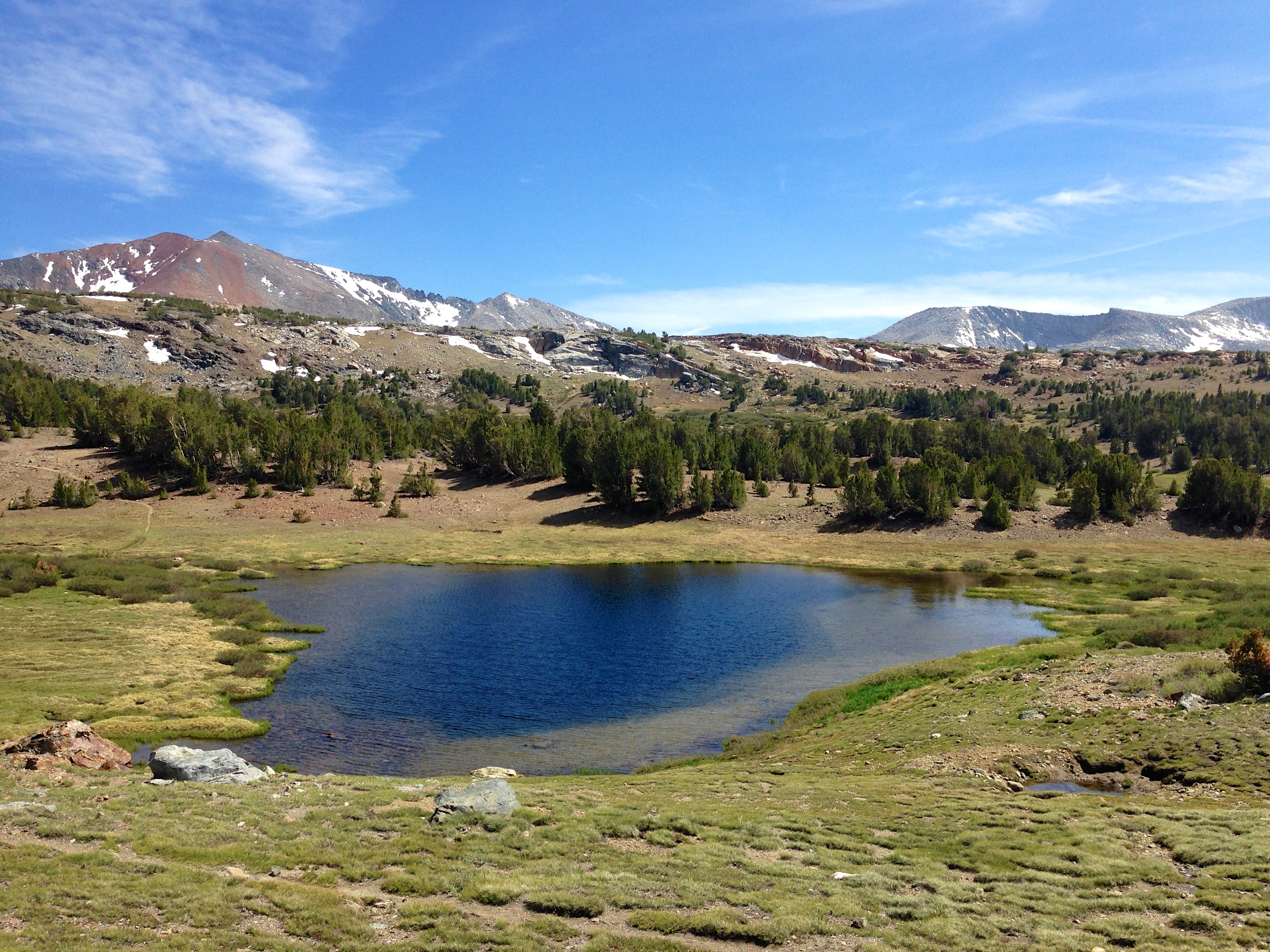
A tarn, on the Mono Pass Trail

As to hiking, there are a wealth of references.

== See also ==
- Ruby Peak, fairly near.
