= Mills Mill =

- U.S. National Register of Historic Places
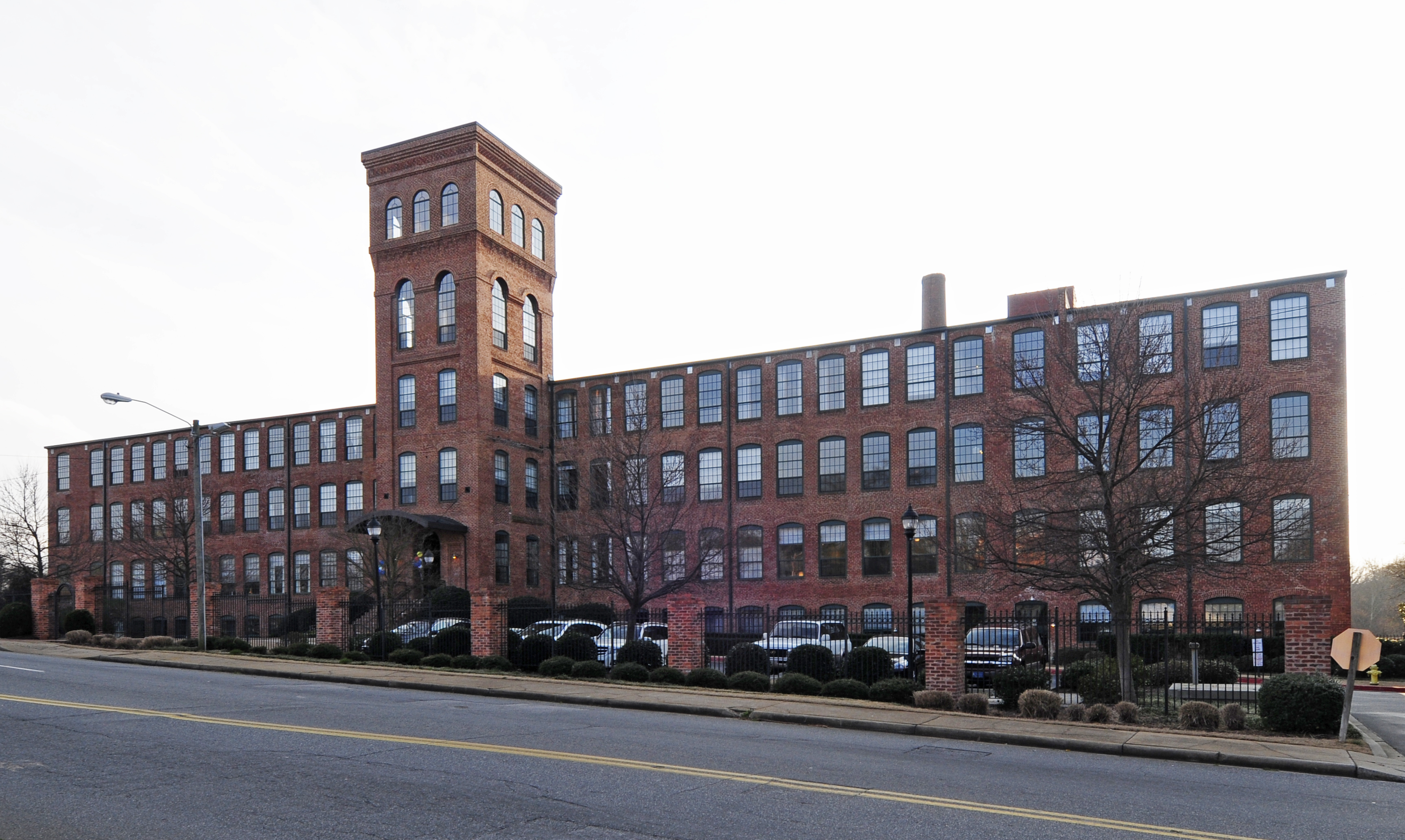
- Mills Mill, 2012

- Location within South Carolina Location within the United States
- Location: 400 Mills Avenue, Greenville, South Carolina
- Coordinates: 34°49′40″N 82°24′38″W
- Area: six acres
- Built: 1896
- Architectural style: Romanesque Revival
- NRHP reference No.: 82003861
- Added to NRHP: July 1, 1982

Mills Mill was a textile mill in Greenville, South Carolina (1897–1978). In the 21st century, it was converted into loft-style condominia. The property is listed on the National Register of Historic Places.

== History ==
Mills Manufacturing Company was organized during the mid-1890s by entrepreneur Otis Prentiss Mills (1840–1915), a native of Henderson County, North Carolina, and a former Confederate officer. The corporation received its charter and began construction of the brick mill in 1896—just outside city limits to avoid paying city taxes, and near Brushy Creek to have water for steam generation and a holding pond. Mills convinced the Southern Railway to put in a siding, and in 1897, he opened the mill with 5,000 spindles and about two hundred employees, mostly former tenant farmers from the mountains of North and South Carolina. By 1903, there were 120 houses and a thousand residents in the mill village; in 1907 there were 450 employees and 27,000 spindles in a mill that produced cotton bed sheets, twills, and satin. Workers pastured their cows on the flood plain and put outhouses, pig sties, and chicken coops behind their residences. The mill also built a company store, a church used alternately by Baptist and Methodist congregations, and a YMCA that employed two paid social workers.

After O.P. Mills died in 1915, he was succeeded by his son-in-law, Walter B. Moore, who had both textile mill experience and a paternalistic style of management typical of the era. Moore hired an English "gardener," a landscape architect, to beautify the grounds and provided running water and a sewer system for all the mill village houses.

After Moore's death in 1918, the mill was sold to Alan Graham, who in 1920 sold it to the Reeves Brothers Company of Spartanburg. In the 1920s the mill built more houses in the village and sponsored the Mills Mill Millers textile league baseball team. In the late 1930s the village had about 1,200 residents.

The Great Depression came early to the textile industry, and management instituted what employees called the "stretch-out," an attempt to increase productivity from the mill hands. In May 1929 five hundred workers walked out, demanding an end to the stretch-out, a 20% raise, and no discrimination against union members. Mill president Arthur Ligon pleaded with workers to return to their jobs, but they refused until July, after the local manufacturers' association pledged to eliminate night work for women and minors under eighteen. Otherwise, the workers gained nothing. Mills Mill employees did not participate in the national textile workers strike of 1934.

During World War II the mill operated on three shifts, seven days a week to produce herringbone fabric for Marine uniforms. Mills Mill continued to prosper in the immediate postwar era, though Reeves Brothers sold the village houses and discontinued support for the sports teams and for community maintenance and security. During the 1970s, domestic textile production came under increased foreign competition. In 1977, Reeves Brothers dismissed two hundred workers, and the following year, the plant was closed.

== Post-closure ==
Like many textile mills built at the turn of the 20th century in the Piedmont, Mills Mill was not easily modernized for textile production, but the building had a "singularly elegant design" and was located near I-185 and the expanding campus of the Greenville Hospital System. In 1982, the mill was listed on the National Register. In 1985 the Greenville County Redevelopment Authority made extensive changes to the village's water supply and drainage system and provided financing to renovate ninety houses near what had become a major Greenville thoroughfare. The YMCA was converted to apartments, and retail outlets and restaurants operated from the former mill from 1979 to 1996.

In 2004, Centennial American Properties converted the mill to condominia that boasted "16-foot ceilings, 9-foot window bands, giant heart of pine beams, and exposed red brick walls." Developers also provided a club room, a gym, a pool, and "professionally landscaped common areas."

== Photographs ==
Photographs of the mill, village, and community can be viewed in the Greenville County Library System digital collections.
