= Chen Din Hwa =

Hong Kong businessman

Chen Din-hwa
- 陳廷驊
- Born: 1923; Ningbo, Zhejiang, China
- Died: 17 June 2012 (aged 89); Hong Kong
- Citizenship: Hong Kong
- Occupation: Businessman
- Spouse: Yang Foo Oi (divorced)
- Children: Angela Chen Wai-fong and Vivien Chen Wai Wai (daughters)

Chen Din-hwa OBE (simplified Chinese: 陈廷骅; traditional Chinese: 陳廷驊; pinyin: Chén Tínghuá; 1923 – 17 June 2012) was a Hong Kong industrial tycoon, billionaire and philanthropist. He was known as the "King of Cotton Yarn" in Hong Kong.

== Life and career ==
Chen was born in Ningbo, Zhejiang, Republic of China in 1923. His family was poor and he left school at the age of 12 to serve as an apprentice to a silk merchant. His father was reportedly a Shanghai-based industrialist, mainly in textiles. When Chen was 22 years old, he was already chief manager of his family business and owned several shops and factories in Shanghai and Ningbo. In 1949, Chen's family shifted to Hong Kong and set up in business there. He set up a successful cotton-yarn maker called Nan Fung Mill.

In 1954, he established Nan Fung Textiles, becoming chairman, and Nan Fung Development Limited. The company also developed interests in shipping.

When diagnosed with Alzheimer's disease in 2009, Chen handed over control of his business to his younger daughter Vivien Chen, who had been part of the business since 1981. In 2010, his wife Yang Foo Oi and elder daughter Angela, a trained architect who lived in the United States and now in Hong Kong, sued younger daughter Vivian, alleging that Chen was misled into transferring assets to a trust fund controlled by Vivian. Yang divorced him in 2011.

Chen died on 17 June 2012 at the age of 89, reportedly of prostate cancer. At his death he was ranked by Forbes as the 14th wealthiest person in Hong Kong, with a net worth of US$2.6 billion, though earlier in his career he had been among the top ten.

== Family and personal life ==
Chen was married to Yang Foo Oi until 2011, when the couple divorced. They had two daughters. As a devout Buddhist, Chen founded the eponymous D.H. Chen Foundation, which provides charity services in education, welfare and medicine.

== See also ==
- Nan Fung Group
- The Mills, Hong Kong
