= Mills Building =

Mills Building may refer to:

- Mills Building (San Diego)
- Mills Building (San Francisco)
- Mills Building (New York City)
- Anson Mills Building, El Paso, Texas
- Mills Building, historic building at South Carolina State Hospital
- Mills Building (Longview, Washington), listed on the NRHP in Cowlitz County, Washington
