= Mills (given name) =

Mills is a male given name which may refer to:

- Mills Darden (1799–1857), alleged to have been one of the largest men in history
- Mills Gardner (1830–1910), American politician and attorney from Ohio
- Mills Edwin Godwin Jr. (1914–1999), American governor of Virginia
- Mills Lane (1937–2022), American judge and star of the TV show Judge Mills Lane, boxer and boxing referee
- Mills Lane (banker) (1912–1989), American banker, uncle of the above
- Mills Watson (born 1940), American actor
- Mills Wills (fl. 1777–1796), American politician and militia officer from Virginia
