= Mills Valley (Utah) =

Basin in Juab County, Utah, United States

Coordinates: 39°27′30″N 112°03′07″W

Mills Valley is a basin along the Sevier River in southeastern Juab County, Utah, United States. It contains a number of geological faults and springs, and contains a population of Least Chub.

== See also ==
- List of valleys of Utah
