= Nan Fung Group =

Chinese business group

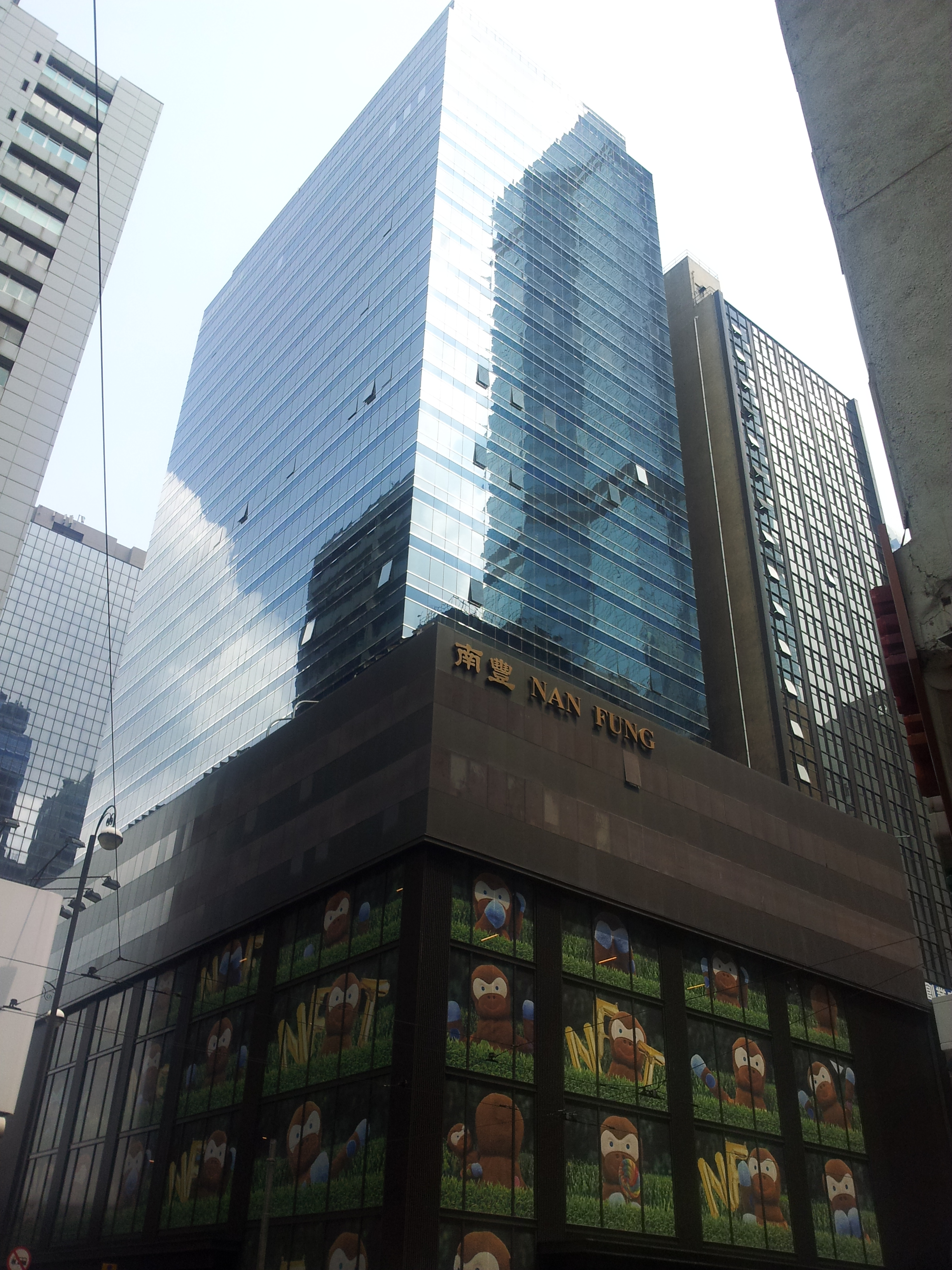
- Headquarters at Nan Fung Tower
- Company type: Private
- Industry: Conglomerate
- Founded: May 27, 1954; 72 years ago
- Headquarters: 23rd Floor, Nan Fung Tower, 88 Connaught Road C, Central, Hong Kong
- Key people: Chen Din Hwa (deceased, founder); Vivien Chen (chair emeritus); Antony Leung (chair and chief executive)
- Products: Real estate, hotels, investment, shipping
- Website: nanfung.com

Nan Fung Group
- Traditional Chinese: 南豐集團
- Simplified Chinese: 南丰集团
Transcriptions
Standard Mandarin
- Hanyu Pinyin: Nánfēng Jituán
Yue: Cantonese
- Jyutping: naam4 fung1 zaap6 tyun4

Nan Fung Group (Chinese: 南豐集團) is a privately held group of companies carrying on the business of property development as its core business in Greater China, as well as shipping, textiles and financial services. It is also one of the leading property developers and largest privately held developers in Hong Kong.

== Company background ==
The history of Nan Fung Group can be traced back to 27 May 1954, when Nan Fung Textiles Limited (南豐紡織有限公司) was founded by Ningbo-born businessman, Chen Din Hwa as a small textile company in Hong Kong. Nan Fung Group started its first real estate project in 1965. In 1978, it developed its first major private housing estate, Nam Fung Sun Chuen, in Quarry Bay, Hong Kong.

== Property development and other businesses ==
Nan Fung Group has property development as its core business. The group entered the property development business in the mid-1960s in Hong Kong by purchasing residential and commercial buildings and then by land acquisition for development. In the mid-1990s, the group began investing in China's property market and since 2001 has built projects in major Chinese cities including Beijing, Shanghai and Guangzhou. The group is also involved in international projects as sole investor or as a joint venture partner in major cities around the world.

Nan Fung Group diversifies in businesses in areas such as property construction, property management, property finance, hotel and the shipping industries.

== Executives ==
Vivien Chen, the younger daughter of Chen Din Hwa, became the Chairman of Nan Fung Group when her father was diagnosed with Alzheimer's disease in 2009 and stepped down in 2014. Vivien is still the company's controlling stakeholder and serves as honorary chairman while her youngest daughter Vanessa serves as the managing director.

Antony Leung, the former Financial Secretary of Hong Kong, joined Nan Fung Group as the group's Chief Executive in February 2014.

=== List of chairmen ===
- Chen Din-hwa (1954–2009)
- Vivian Chen (2009–2016)
- Antony Leung (2016– )
