= Mount Mills (California) =

Mountain in the state of California

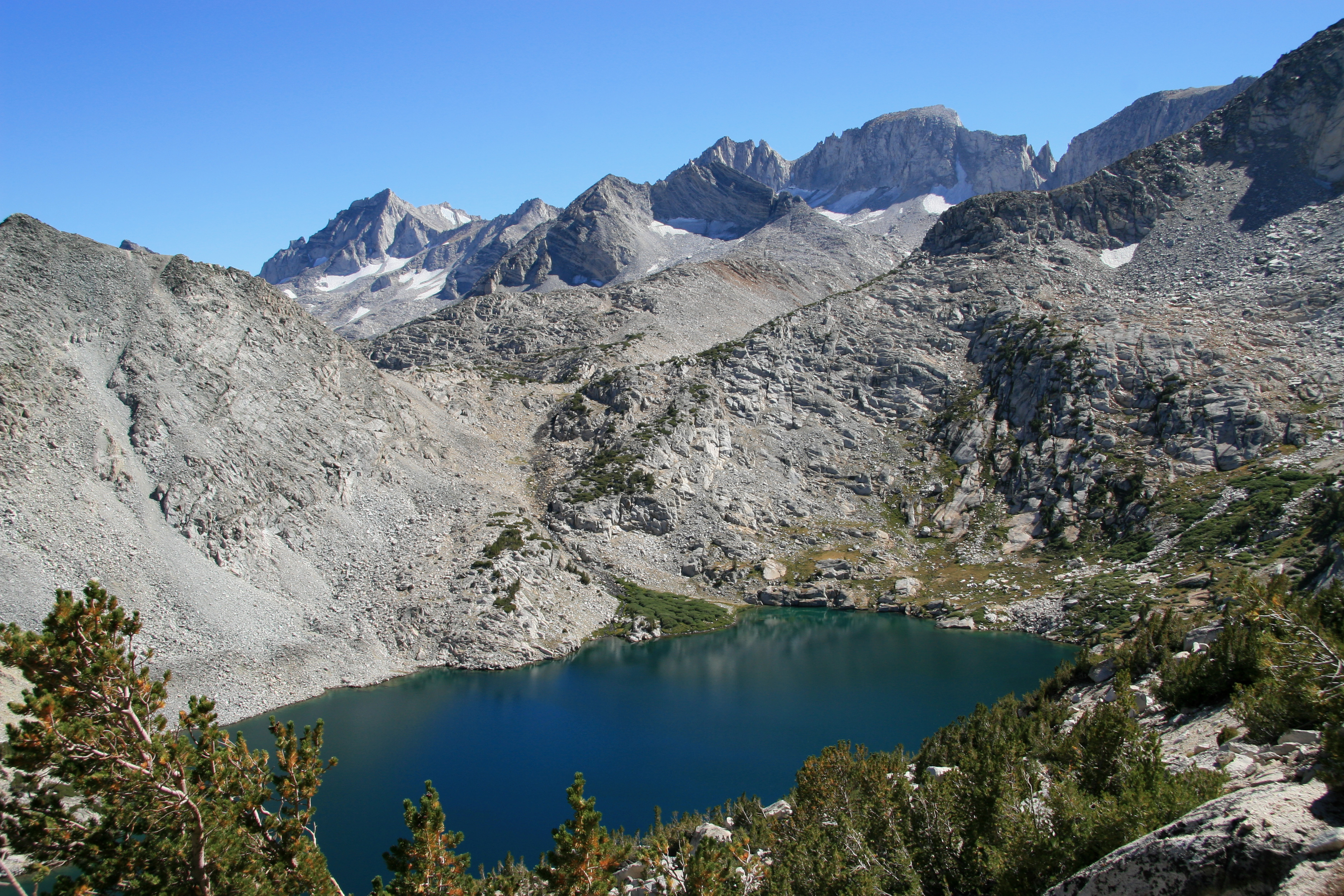
- Mount Mills is the peak on the left, seen from above Ruby Lake

Highest point
- Elevation: 13,457 ft (4,102 m) NAVD 88
- Prominence: 451 ft (137 m)
- Listing: Sierra Peaks Section; Vagmarken Club Sierra Crest List; Western States Climbers Emblem peak
- Coordinates: 37°23′38″N 118°47′27″W

Geography
- Location within California Location within the United States
- Location: John Muir Wilderness; Fresno / Inyo counties, California, U.S.
- Parent range: Sierra Nevada
- Topo map: USGS Mount Abbot

Climbing
- First ascent: August 1921 by Norman Clyde
- Easiest route: Exposed scramble, class 3

Mount Mills is a Thirteener and California 4000 meter peak, on the Sierra Crest, north of Mount Abbot and south of Mono Pass in the Sierra Nevada.

The mountain is located within the John Muir Wilderness area. The 13,457 feet (4,102 m) summit marks the boundary between northwestern Inyo County and eastern Fresno County.

The Mono Recesses are to the west of Mount Mills.

== History ==
The mountain is named in honor of Darius Ogden Mills, a banker who founded the city of Millbrae, California and the Carson and Colorado Railroad. The name appeared on the first edition of the Mt Goddard topographic map in 1912.
