= List of museums in Hong Kong =

The following is a list of museums in Hong Kong.

Museum	Location	Department	Government run?
Airport Core Programme Exhibition Centre	401 Castle Peak Road, Ting Kau, New Territories	HAD	*
Art Museum of the Chinese University of Hong Kong	Chinese University of Hong Kong, Sha Tin, New Territories		
Centre for Heritage, Arts and Textile	The Mills, 45 Pak Tin Par Street, Tsuen Wan.		
City Gallery	3 Edinburgh Place, Central	PlanD	*
Dr Sun Yat-sen Museum	Kom Tong Hall, 7 Castle Road, Mid-Levels	LCSD	*
Fanling Environmental Resource Centre	9 Wo Mun Street, Fanling, New Territories	EPD	*
Fireboat Alexander Grantham Exhibition Gallery	Quarry Bay Park, Quarry Bay, Hong Kong Island	LCSD	*
Flagstaff House Museum of Tea Ware	Hong Kong Park, 10 Cotton Tree Drive, Central, Hong Kong Island	LCSD	*
Tao Heung Foods of Mankind Museum	13 Au Pui Wan Street, Fo Tan, Sha Tin, New Territories		
Guwei Museum	33/F, Global Trade Square, 21 Wong Chuk Hang Road, Aberdeen, Hong Kong Island		
Health Education Exhibition and Resource Centre	Kowloon Park, Tsim Sha Tsui, Kowloon	FEHD	*
Hong Kong Children's Discovery Museum	Shop E (G/F) and 1/F, Island Walk, 163 Shau Kei Wan Road, Sai Wan Ho, Hong Kong Island		
Hong Kong Monetary Authority Information Centre	Two International Finance Centre, 8 Finance Street, Central		*
Hong Kong Correctional Services Museum	45 Tung Tau Wan Road, Stanley, Hong Kong Island		*
Hong Kong Film Archive	50 Lei King Road, Sai Wan Ho, Hong Kong Island	LCSD	*
Hong Kong Heritage Discovery Centre	Kowloon Park, Tsim Sha Tsui, Kowloon	LCSD	*
Hong Kong Heritage Museum	1 Man Lam Road, Shatin, New Territories	LCSD	*
Hong Kong House of Stories	Blue House, 72-74A Stone Nullah Lane, Wan Chai		
Hong Kong Housing Authority Exhibition Centre	80 Fat Kwong Street, Ho Man Tin, Kowloon		*
Hong Kong Immigration Museum	Tuen Mun, New Territories	IMMD	*
Hong Kong International Hobby and Toy Museum (permanently closed)	Yau Ma Tei, Kowloon		
Hong Kong Jockey Club Drug InfoCentre	R/F, Low Block, Queensway Government Offices, 66 Queensway, Admiralty, Hong Kong Island	ND	*
Hong Kong Maritime Museum	Ferry Pier 8, Central, Hong Kong Island		
Hong Kong Museum of Art	10 Salisbury Road, Tsim Sha Tsui, Kowloon	LCSD	*
Hong Kong Museum of the War of Resistance and Coastal Defence	175 Tung Hei Road, Shau Kei Wan, Hong Kong Island	LCSD	*
Hong Kong Museum of Education	Block D1, Podium Level, Education University of Hong Kong, 10 Lo Ping Road, Tai Po, New Territories		
Hong Kong Museum of History	100 Chatham Road South, Tsim Sha Tsui, Kowloon	LCSD	*
Hong Kong Museum of Medical Sciences	2 Caine Lane, Mid-levels, Hong Kong Island		
Hong Kong Palace Museum	Museum Drive, West Kowloon Cultural District, Kowloon		*
Hong Kong Police Museum	27 Coombe Road, The Peak, Hong Kong Island	HKPF	*
Hong Kong Public Records Building	13 Tsui Ping Road, Kwun Tong, Kowloon		*
Hong Kong Racing Museum	2/F, Happy Valley Stand, Happy Valley, Hong Kong Island		
Hong Kong Railway Museum	13 Shung Tak Street, Tai Po, New Territories	LCSD	*
Hong Kong Science Museum	2 Science Museum Road, Tsim Sha Tsui East, Kowloon	LCSD	*
Hong Kong Space Museum	10 Salisbury Road, Tsim Sha Tsui, Kowloon	LCSD	*
Hong Kong Visual Arts Centre	Hong Kong Park, 10 Cotton Tree Drive, Central	LCSD	*
Jockey Club Museum of Climate Change	Yasumoto International Academic Park, Chinese University of Hong Kong, Sha Tin, New Territories		
June 4th Museum (permanently closed)	3 Austin Avenue, Tsim Sha Tsui until July 11, 2016		
Lantau Link Visitors Centre and Viewing Platform	Northwest Corner of Tsing Yi, New Territories		*
Law Uk Folk Museum (Restoration)	Hakka Village House, Chai Wan, Hong Kong Island	LCSD	*
Lei Cheng Uk Han Tomb Museum	41 Tonkin Street, Sham Shui Po, Kowloon	LCSD	*
Liang Yi Museum	181–199 Hollywood Road, Sheung Wan, Hong Kong Island		
Lions Nature Education Centre	Tsiu Hang Special Area, Sai Kung, New Territories		
M+	West Kowloon Cultural District, West Kowloon, Kowloon		
Madame Tussauds Hong Kong	Peak Tower, 128 Peak Road, The Peak, Hong Kong Island		
Dr & Mrs Hung Hin Shiu Museum of Chinese Medicine	Hong Kong Baptist University, Kowloon Tong		
Museum of Ethnology	Tai Po		
The Museum of Hong Kong Literature	3/F, 7 Mallory Street, Wan Chai, Hong Kong Island		
Oi!	12 Oil Street, North Point, Hong Kong Island	LCSD	*
Ping Shan Tang Clan Gallery cum Heritage Trail Visitors Centre	Ping Shan	LCSD	*
Po Leung Kuk Museum	66 Leighton Road, Causeway Bay, Hong Kong Island		
Queen's College History Museum	120 Causeway Road, Tin Hau, Hong Kong Island		
The Record Museum	12/F, 39 Yiu Wa Street, Causeway Bay		
Sam Tung Uk Museum	Former Hakka walled village, Tsuen Wan	LCSD	*
Sau Choi Mansion	Ping Shan		
Scout Gallery (Hong Kong)	11/F, Hong Kong Scout Center, j/o Scout Path – Austin Road, Yau Ma Tei		
Sheung Yiu Folk Museum	Former Hakka village, Sai Kung	LCSD	*
Sun Museum	4/F, SML Tower, 165 Hoi Bun Road, Kwun Tong		
Tai Kwun – Centre for Heritage and Arts	10 Hollywood Rd, Central, Hong Kong		
Tai O Folk Museum	Tai O		
Tao Heung Museum of Food Culture	Fo Tan		
Tsuen Wan Environmental Resource Centre	Tsuen Wan	EPD	*
Tsui Museum of Art	(former)		
Tung Wah Museum	Kwong Wah Hospital, Waterloo Road, Yau Ma Tei		
University Museum and Art Gallery	(formerly Fung Ping Shan Museum) within the University of Hong Kong		
Urban Renewal Authority Information Centre	Queen's Road Central, Sheung Wan		*
Wan Chai Environmental Resource Centre	Wan Chai	EPD	*

(LCSD) indicates a museum managed by the Leisure and Cultural Services Department
(EPD) indicates a museum managed by the Environmental Protection Department
* indicates government-run museums

== See also ==
- Culture of Hong Kong
- History of Hong Kong
- List of buildings and structures in Hong Kong
- Tourism in Hong Kong
