= Hong Kong Museum of History =

Museum in Kowloon, Hong Kong

- 香港歷史博物館

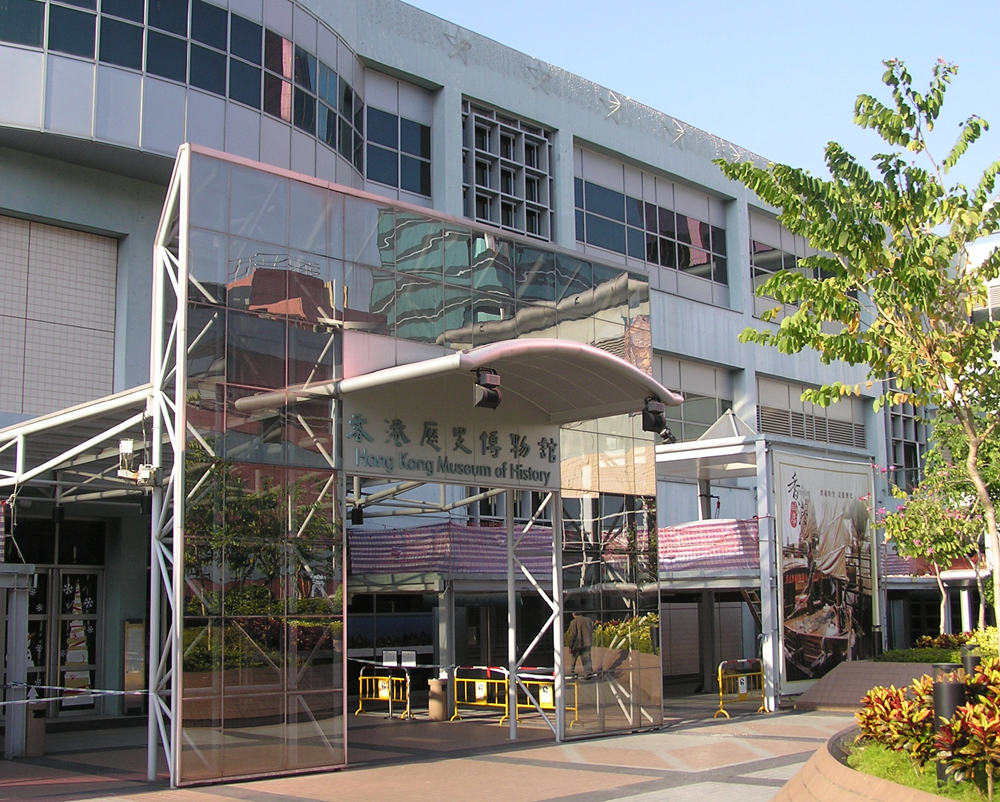
- Front entrance to the museum
- Established: July 1975; 51 years ago
- Location: 100 Chatham Road South, Tsim Sha Tsui East, Kowloon, Hong Kong
- Coordinates: 22°18′06″N 114°10′38″E
- Type: History museum
- Collection size: 170,000
- Visitors: 1,038,000 (year ending March 2017)
- Director: Joyce Ho Wai-yee
- Curators: Osmond Chan Shing-hon, Connie Cheung Lai-kwan, Humphrey Yuen Chi-tai
- Owner: Leisure and Cultural Services Department
- Public transit access: Hung Hom station (Exit D1); Tsim Sha Tsui station (Exit B2); East Tsim Sha Tsui station (Exit P2)
- Website: hk.history.museum

Hong Kong Museum of History
- Traditional Chinese: 香港歷史博物館
- Simplified Chinese: 香港历史博物馆
Transcriptions
Standard Mandarin
- Hanyu Pinyin: Xiānggǎng Lìshǐbówùguǎn
Yue: Cantonese
- Yale Romanization: Hēung góng lihk sí bok maht gún
- Jyutping: Hoeng^{1} gong^{2} lik^{6} si^{2} bok^{3} mat^{6} gun^{2}

The Hong Kong Museum of History (HKMH) is a public museum that preserves Hong Kong's historical and cultural heritage. It is located next to the Hong Kong Science Museum, in Tsim Sha Tsui East, Kowloon. The collections of the museum encompass natural history, archaeology, ethnography, local history, and the development and evolution of the city's culture.

== History ==
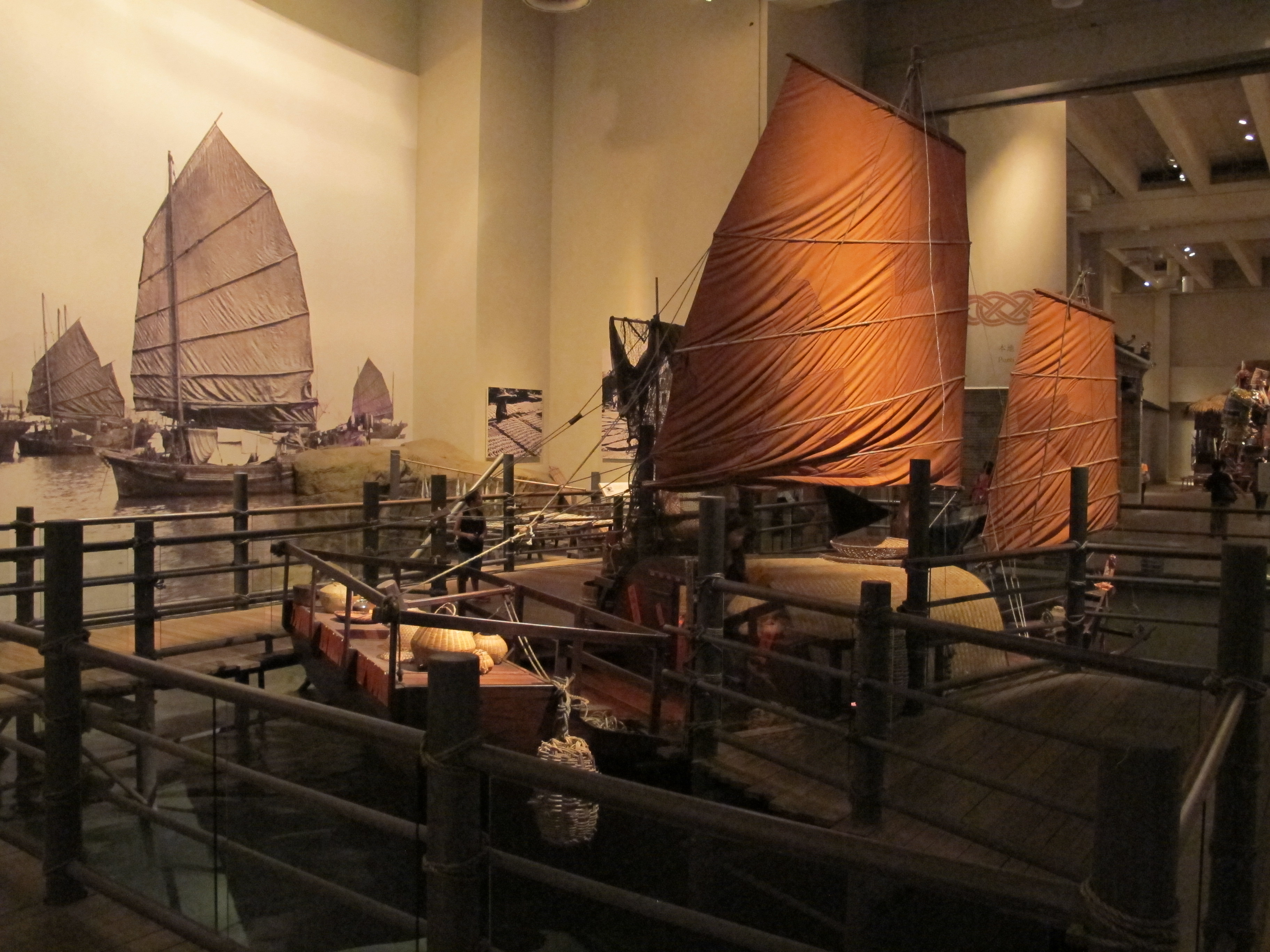
Exhibition of a junk in August 2013

The museum was established by the Urban Council in July 1975 when the City Museum and Art Gallery was split into the Hong Kong Museum of History and Hong Kong Museum of Art; some of the Museum of History's collections were on display at the City Museum and Art Gallery's original 1962 location at the City Hall. From 1975 to 1983, the HKMH was housed in a 700 m^{2} (7,500 sq ft) rented space within Star House. In 1983, it was moved to a temporary location (which now houses Hong Kong Heritage Discovery Centre) in Kowloon Park, and moved again in 1998 to a permanent place, on the present premises opposite the Hong Kong Science Museum on Chatham Road South, Tsim Sha Tsui. It is managed by the Leisure and Cultural Services Department of the Hong Kong Government.

== Permanent Exhibitions ==
=== The Hong Kong Story ===
Since 30 August 2001, The Hong Kong Story, a showcase of the history and development of Hong Kong, is the main permanent exhibition of the HKMH.

From its opening until 2020, The Hong Kong Story comprised eight galleries located on two floors, occupying 7,000 m^{2} (75,000 sq ft). Through the display of over 4,000 exhibits with the use of graphic panels, a number of dioramas and multi-media programmes, and enhanced with special audio-visual and lighting effects, The Hong Kong Story outlined the natural environment, folk culture, and historical development of Hong Kong. The exhibition started from the Devonian period 400 million years ago and concluded with the Handover of Hong Kong in 1997. The museum exhibits prehistoric fossils, colonial documents from the 19th Century and Ancient Chinese pottery.

After receiving over 10 million visitors since its opening, The Hong Kong Story permanent exhibition closed on 19 October 2020 for an extensive renovation. It reopened on 1 April 2026, after nearly six years, but this time occupying only the entire ground floor.

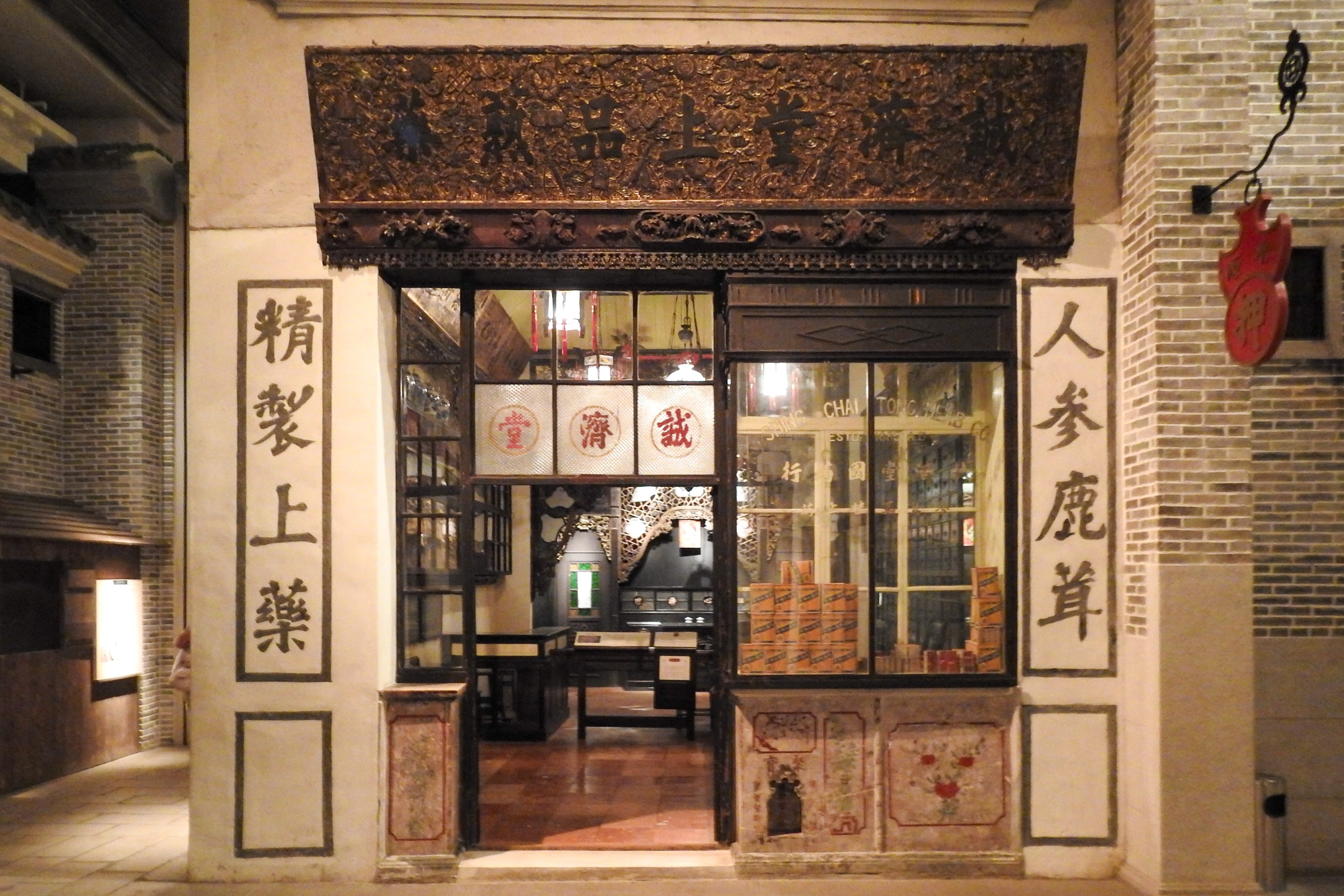
A recreation of Shing Chai Tong Herb Co., one of Hong Kong’s oldest Chinese medicine firms, founded in 1885. It ceased operations in 1980, with its furnishings acquired by and displayed at the HKMH.

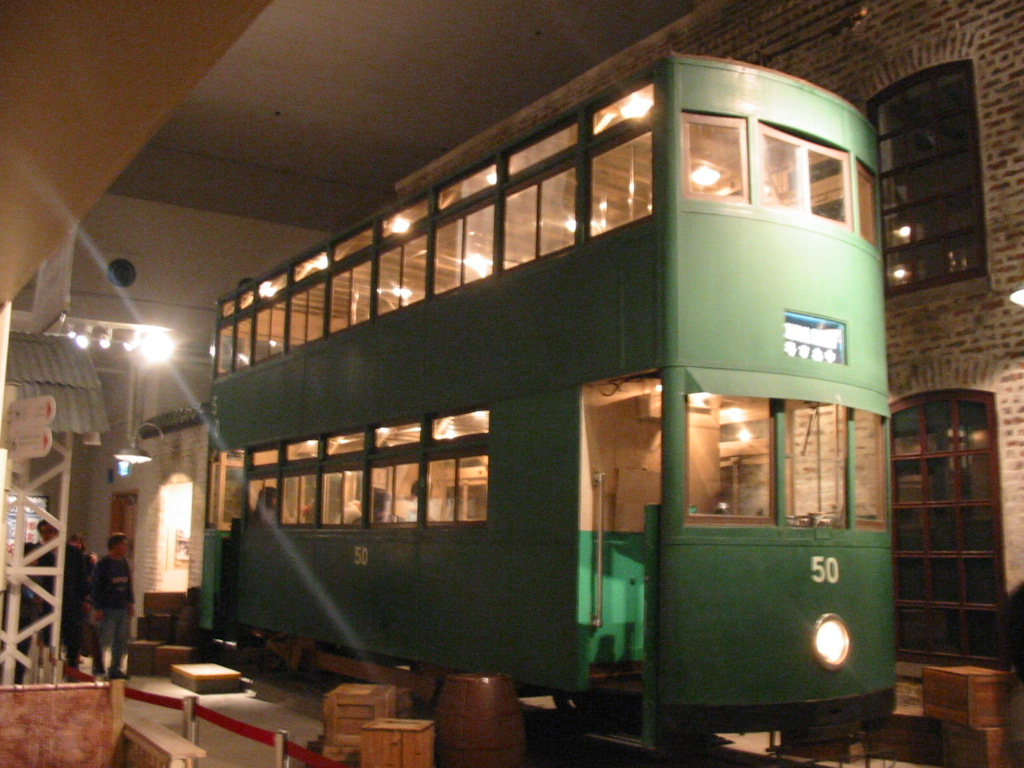
Tram #50

The newly renovated permanent exhibition now comprises ten galleries under four themes, "Roots of Culture", "East meets West", "Coalition against Japanese Aggression", and "Hong Kong as a Global Metropolis", and uses immersive historical scenes and advanced and interactive technology for storytelling, to show the Hong Kong people's resilience and how they are connected deeply to the motherland. It also contains exhibits never seen prior to the renovation, and topics that extend beyond the 1997 handover.

=== Multifaceted Hong Kong ===
From 27 November 2024 to 6 July 2026, the museum hosted Multifaceted Hong Kong, a series of exhibitions that delve into the history of community developments in the Yau Tsim Mong District, stories of the Hong Kong Portuguese community who came in from Macau, and Hong Kong's connections to Chinese emigrants in California. This was the first phase of the Museum's revamped permanent exhibition; it was located on the second floor and mezzanine.

== Branch museums ==
The HKMH runs four branch museums: Lei Cheng Uk Han Tomb Museum in Sham Shui Po, Law Uk Folk Museum in Chai Wan, Fireboat Alexander Grantham Exhibition Gallery inside the Quarry Bay Park and Dr. Sun Yat-sen Museum at Mid-Levels in Central.

== Transportation ==
The museum is accessible within walking distance from Exit D1 of Hung Hom station, Exit B2 of Tsim Sha Tsui station or Exit P2 of East Tsim Sha Tsui station of the MTR.

== See also ==
- Government Records Service
- Heritage conservation in Hong Kong
- History of Hong Kong
- Hong Kong Archaeological Society
- Hong Kong Heritage Museum
- List of buildings and structures in Hong Kong
- List of museums in Hong Kong
