= Law Uk Folk Museum =

Coordinates: 22.264266°N 114.235512°E

Law Uk Hakka House
- 羅屋 (Chinese)
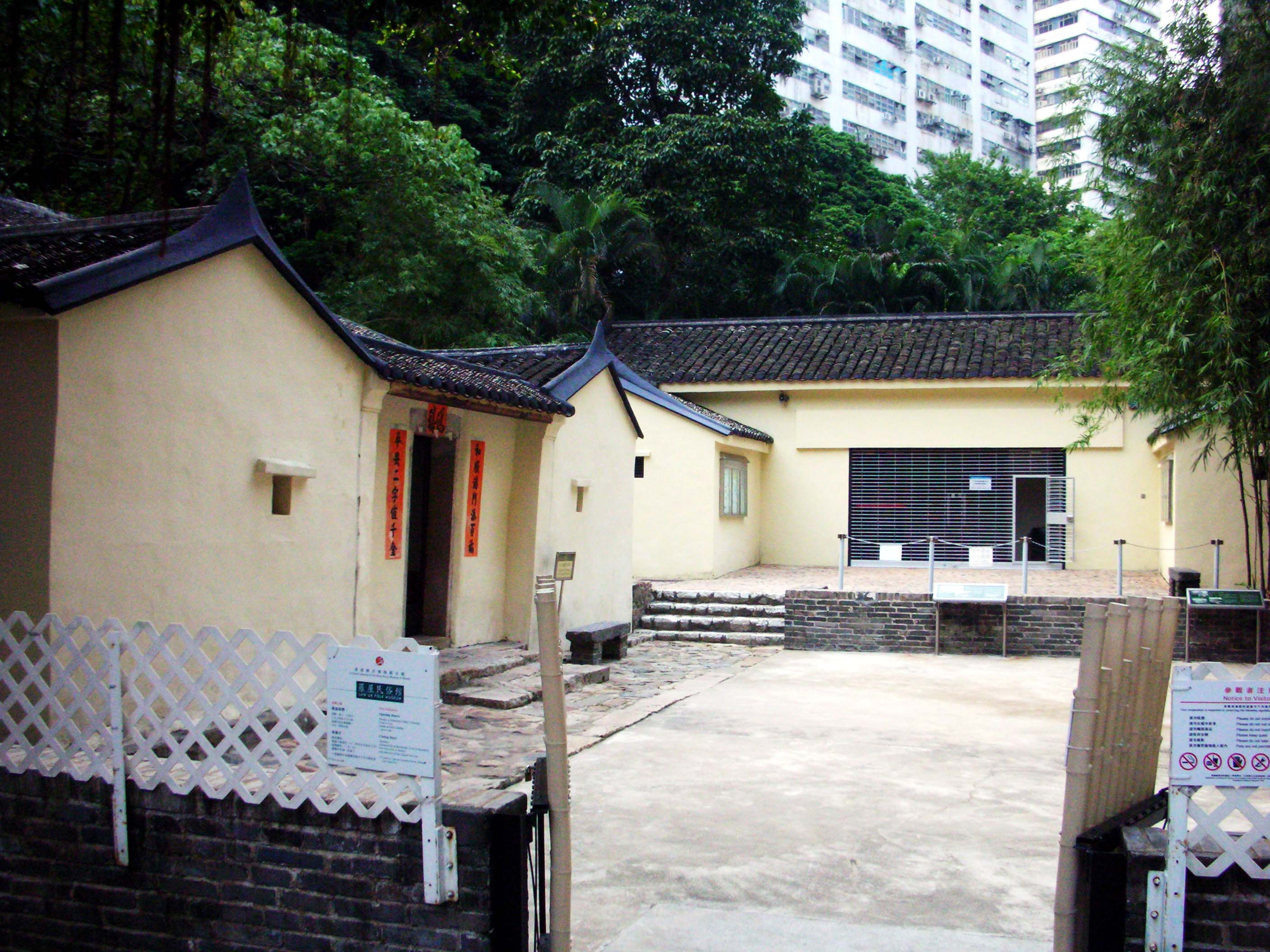
- Law Uk Hakka House
- Interactive map of Law Uk Hakka House
- Location: 14 Kut Shing Street, Chai Wan, Hong Kong

History
- Built: c. 1750s

Site notes
- Restored: 1989
- Restored by: Hong Kong Museum of History
- Governing body: Leisure and Cultural Services Department
- Management: Hong Kong Museum of History
- Visitors: 14,000 (in 2025)
- Public access: Yes

Declared Monument of Hong Kong
- Designated: 10 November 1989; 36 years ago
- Reference no.: 38

Law Uk Folk Museum
- Traditional Chinese: 羅屋
- Literal meaning: Law's House
Transcriptions
Yue: Cantonese
- Yale Romanization: Lòh ūk
- Jyutping: Lo4 uk1

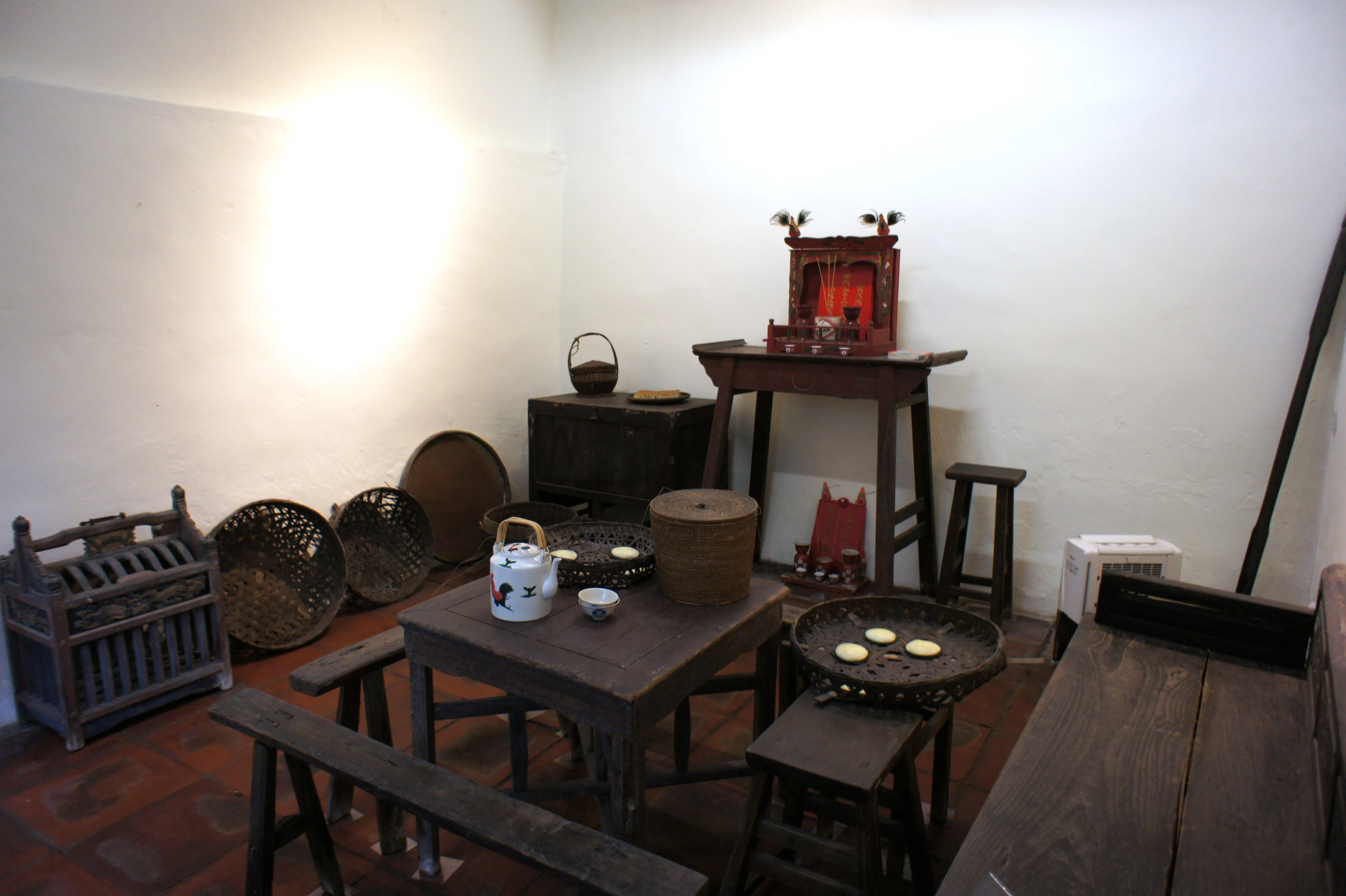
The main room of Law Uk

Law Uk is a former Hakka village house in Chai Wan, Hong Kong. Named after the surname of the family who lived in the house, it was built in the mid-18th century during the Qing Dynasty, about 90 years before the British took possession of Hong Kong Island. It was rediscovered in the 1970s and is a declared monument of Hong Kong. After being restored, the house was turned into the Law Uk Folk Museum, which serves as a branch of the Hong Kong Museum of History. It is the only example of Hakka architecture left in the area.

== History ==
It is not definitively known when Law Uk was completed, but it is estimated that the house was constructed in the mid-18th century. This was about the time when the Law family moved to Hong Kong from Bao'an County in Guangdong province. The approximate date of construction is backed up by official documents from the Qing Dynasty that dated from 1767 and 1796. The existence of these documents—which were in the Law family's possession—came to light when Law Uk was rediscovered. At the time it was built, the house was on Hong Kong Island's waterfront with Victoria Harbour. However, it is now much farther inland due to land reclamation that has been undertaken over the years.

The area around present-day Chai Wan was uninhabited and simply featured barren and forested land. When the Laws moved there, they were part of an entourage of approximately 300 Hakka people, who settled in the area and established a village. The majority of them worked as stonecutters in neighbouring quarries. Others were fishermen due to the area's proximity to the sea. The Law family, however, were impoverished rice farming peasants who also raised chickens and pigs on their farm.

One of Law Uk's wings was destroyed during the Battle of Hong Kong in 1941, when a Japanese shell was dropped onto it. Nonetheless, the village lifestyle of the Hakka continued through the Japanese occupation of Hong Kong until 1945. After the end of World War II, the number of refugees coming to the colony increased dramatically, and they began to set up squatter huts on hills around Chai Wan. This ended up "destroy[ing] the Hakka's way of life."

Due to the shortage of land, the Hakka village was cleared and demolished, and Chai Wan was transformed into an industrial area with many public housing estates. As a result, the Law family moved out of the house in 1960 and were resettled into one of the surrounding housing estates. This was a similar situation for the other villagers, whose descendants now live in apartment complexes close to where the village once stood.

== Restoration ==
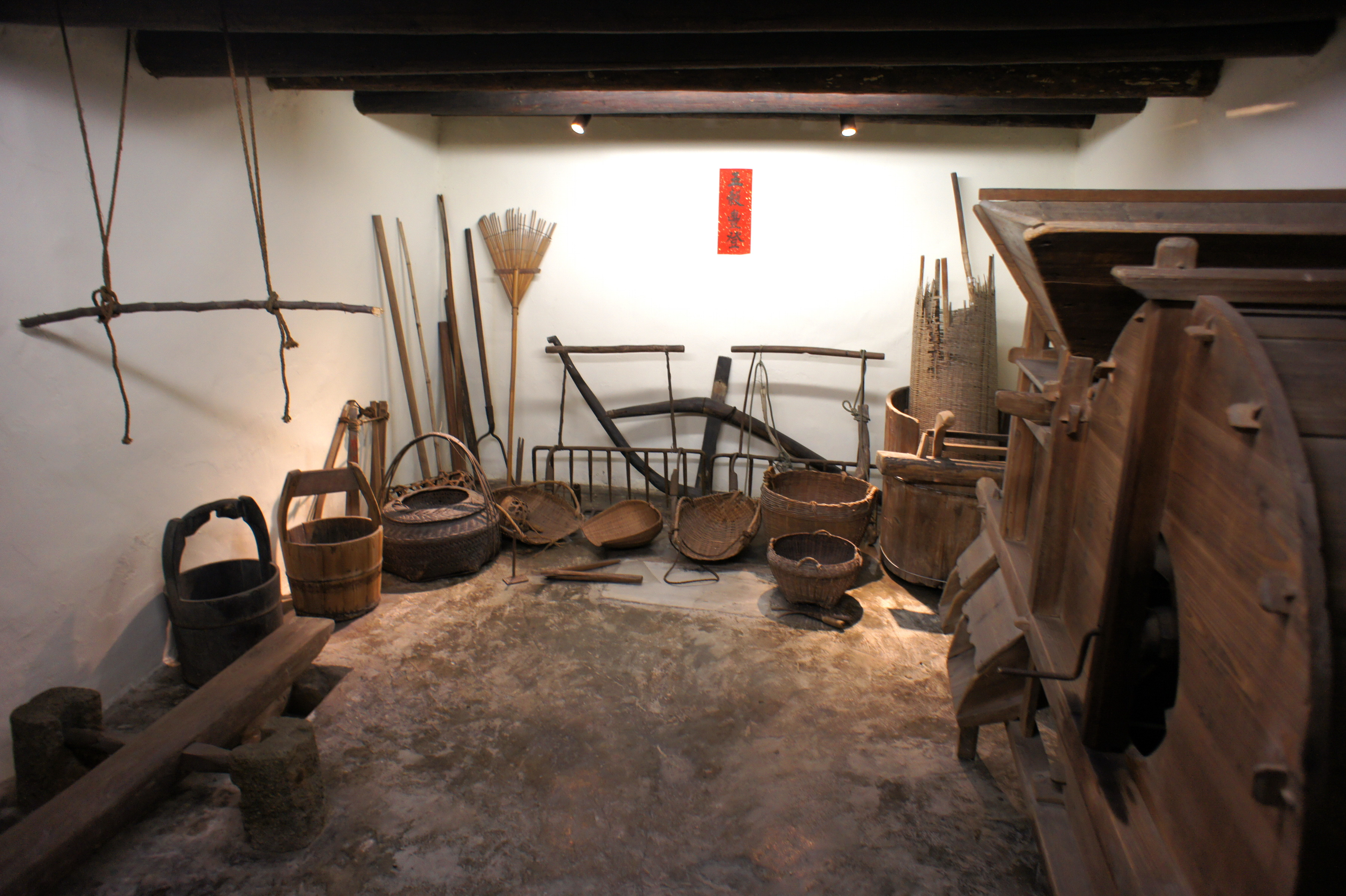
Law Uk's utility room

Before its rediscovery, Law Uk was left in a derelict state and used as a workshop that produced metallic furniture. This caused the building to be a fire hazard, due to the spray paints and other flammable goods stored inside. The Resettlement Department rediscovered the house in the early 1970s and urged the curator of the new Hong Kong Museum of History—which opened in July 1975—to buy and renovate Law Uk.

The building was ultimately restored and reopened as the Law Uk Folk Museum in 1989. It was declared a monument of Hong Kong in the same year on 10 November. The museum served as one of the three branches of the Hong Kong Museum of History, along with the Hong Kong Museum of Coastal Defence and the Lei Cheng Uk Han Tomb Museum. This has now been expanded to five branches with the addition of the Fireboat Alexander Grantham Exhibition Gallery and the Dr Sun Yat-sen Museum.

Due to its modest size and less-than-ideal location among industrial factories, the museum experienced poor attendance over the years. Because of this, the Museum of Hong Kong had contemplated closing the Law Uk Folk Museum. However, it remains open and operating to this day.

Law Uk is the sole surviving village house and the last example of traditional Hakka housing in Chai Wan.

== Architecture ==
Law Uk has been described as a "typical" Hakka house, consisting of five rooms where approximately ten people could live. Centered around the main hall, the house was designed to be symmetrical and features a lightwell at the front of the hall. This was key as the house did not have many windows, for fear of robbers and pirates.

As part of the restoration in the 1980s, a new annex to the house was built that matched the overall architectural style of Law Uk.

== Transportation ==
The site is accessible from Exit B of Chai Wan station.

== See also ==
- Sam Tung Uk Museum
- Sheung Yiu Folk Museum
- List of museums in Hong Kong
