= Dr & Mrs Hung Hin Shiu Museum of Chinese Medicine =

Chinese university museum

- 孔憲紹博士伉儷中醫藥博物館
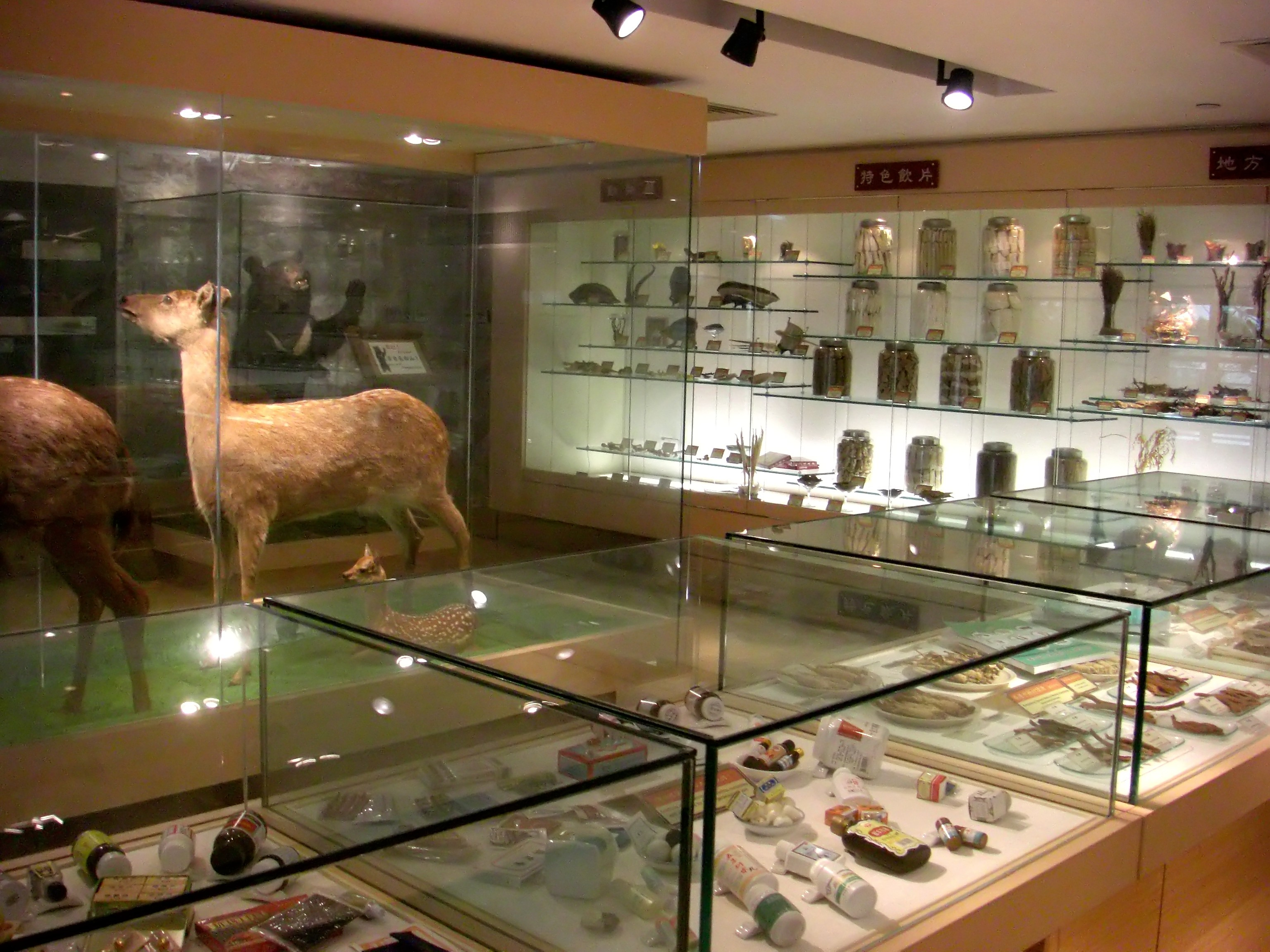
- Dr. & Mrs. Hung Hin Shiu Museum of Chinese Medicine, Hong Kong Baptist University, Hong Kong.
- Established: 14 December 2007
- Location: Ground Floor, Jockey Club School of Chinese Medicine Building, 7 Baptist University Road, Kowloon Tong
- Type: Private
- Website: Official website

Dr & Mrs Hung Hin Shiu Museum of Chinese Medicine
- Traditional Chinese: 孔憲紹博士伉儷中醫藥博物館
Transcriptions
Yue: Cantonese
- Yale Romanization: Húng Hin-siuh bok sih kong laih jūng yī yeuhk bok maht gún
- Jyutping: Hung2 Hin3-siu6 bok3 sih6 kong3 lai6 zung1 ji1 yoek6 bok3 mat6 gun2

The Dr & Mrs Hung Hin Shiu Museum of Chinese Medicine is a privately run museum managed by the Department of Chinese Medicine at the Hong Kong Baptist University.

== History ==
The museum was inaugurated on 14 December 2007. Funded through part of the HK$120 million endowment fund from Dr Hung Hin-shiu and his wife Yeung Pong-wah, who made their fortune through the real estate development firm of Shiu Pong Enterprises.

In the museum a herbalist shop in the basement displays the tools and herbal, animal and mineral medicines that traditional Chinese medicine practitioners used, while other exhibits explore the importance of the "spleen" in Chinese medicine and the evolution of midwifery in Hong Kong. In 2021 the museum website stated that it is closed to the public until further notice.

== Database ==
- Chinese Medicine Specimen Database 中藥標本數據庫 School of Chinese Medicine, Hong Kong Baptist University.(in English and Chinese)

== See also ==
- Hong Kong Baptist University
- List of museums in Hong Kong
