= Hong Kong Science Museum =

Science museum in Hong Kong

- 香港科學館

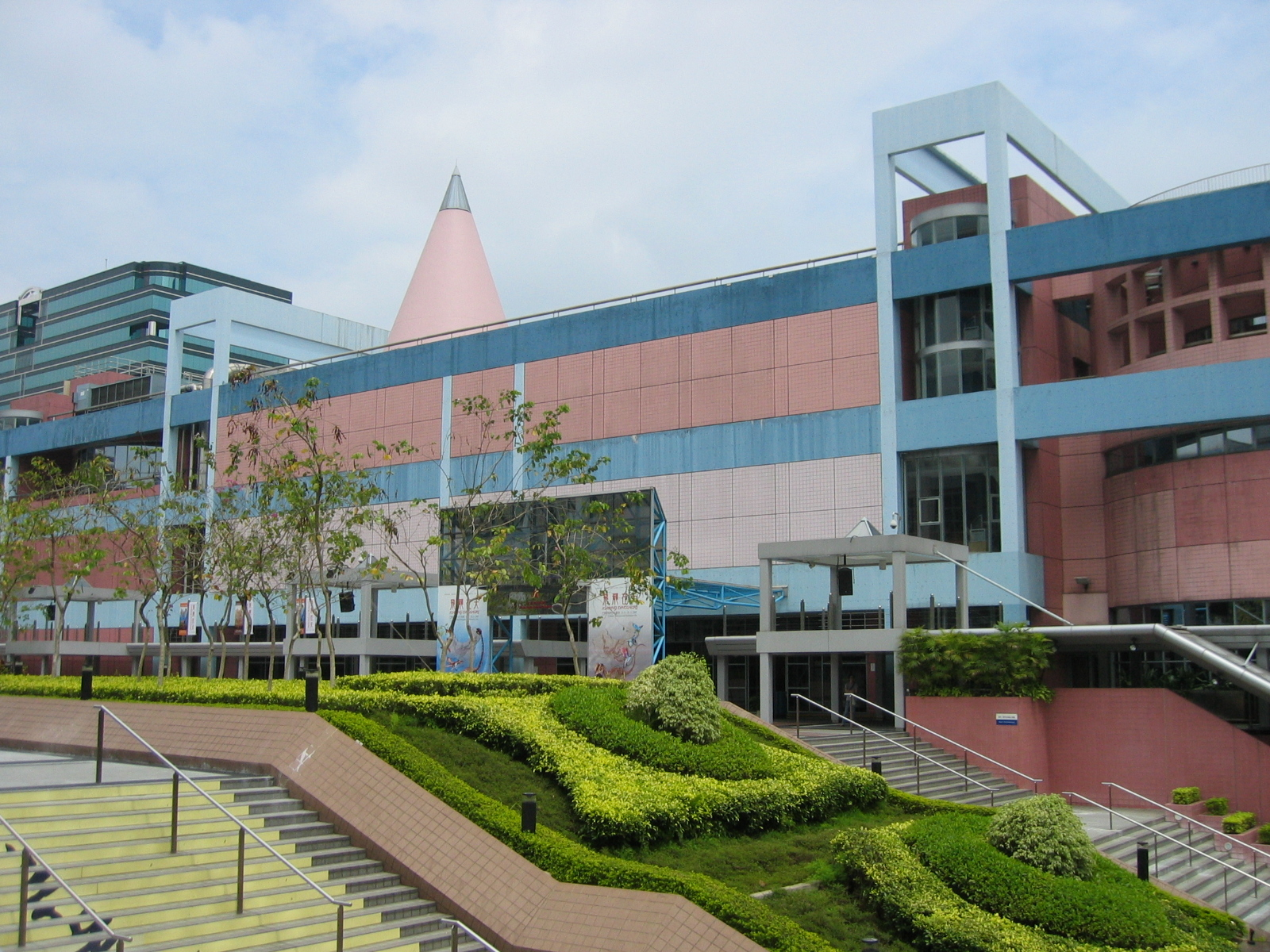
- Exterior view

- Location within Hong Kong
- Established: 18 April 1991; 35 years ago
- Location: 2 Science Museum Road, Tsim Sha Tsui, Kowloon Hong Kong
- Coordinates: 22.301021°N 114.17751°E
- Type: Science museum
- Accreditation: Asia Pacific Network of Science & Technology Centres (ASPAC)
- Visitors: 1,470,000 (2025)
- Director: Lau Kai-ip
- Curators: Samuel Chui Chi-man, Ronne Yuen Yuet-po, Kenus Yan Chui-ho, Frances Leung Wing-yan, Bertha Yeung Ming-sze
- Architect: Palmer and Turner
- Owner: Leisure and Cultural Services Department
- Public transit access: Hung Hom station (Exit D1); Tsim Sha Tsui station (Exit B2); East Tsim Sha Tsui station (Exit P2)
- Website: hk.science.museum

Hong Kong Science Museum
- Traditional Chinese: 香港科學館
- Simplified Chinese: 香港科学馆
Transcriptions
Standard Mandarin
- Hanyu Pinyin: Xiānggǎng Kēxuéguǎn
Yue: Cantonese
- Yale Romanization: Hēung góng fō hohk gún
- Jyutping: Hoeng^{1} gong^{2} fo^{1} hok^{6} gun^{2}

The Hong Kong Science Museum (HKScM) is a public science museum in Tsim Sha Tsui East, Kowloon, Hong Kong, located opposite to the Hong Kong Museum of History.

== History ==
The HKScM was first conceived by the Urban Council in 1976. The council hired American firm E. Verner Johnson and Associates in 1984 to help plan the museum. Three more design firms were later engaged to work on the exhibits: West Office Design, Toshihiko Sakow Associates, and Levy Design. In 1986, the council hired Hong Kong architecture firm Palmer and Turner to design the museum. It was built by Leighton Contractors (Asia) Limited.

Construction began in March 1988 and was completed in November 1990, costing HK$340 million. The HKScM was officially opened by Governor David Wilson and Urban Council Chairman H.M.G. Forsgate on 18 April 1991.

In 2000, the Urban Council was disbanded, and management of the museum became the responsibility of the newly formed Leisure and Cultural Services Department.

== Exhibits ==
The HKScM has Cathay Pacific's first DC-3 airliner suspended from the ceiling.

The most popular exhibition items for children are a computer area, a real (but stationary) car in which visitors can attempt to drive in a driving simulation while avoiding accidents, speeding, and excessive fuel usage, and a small life-sized stationary aircraft with a video of a flight around Hong Kong playing inside the cockpit.

About 500 exhibits are displayed in the permanent exhibition area. The most prominent exhibit is the 22-metre-high twin-tower Energy Machine which is the largest of its kind in the world. A total of eighteen galleries cover a wide range of science and technology topics including light, sound, motion, electricity and magnetism, mathematics, life science, geography, meteorology, computer, transportation, communication, food science, energy/energy conservation and home technology. About 80% of the exhibits are participatory so that visitors may learn through direct involvement.

The museum staff also performs live demonstrations daily, many of which are designed for younger visitors.

In February 2026, the HKScM opened three new galleries as part of its permanent exhibition renewal project: the AI Gallery, InnoTech Gallery, and Living Tech Gallery, introducing topics including artificial intelligence, quantum technology, biotechnology, and sustainable living.

== List of Galleries ==
=== Ground Floor ===
==== Biodiversity Gallery ====
Opened in 2016, this gallery explores the flora and fauna that exist in different habitats as well as locally in Hong Kong. Visitors can also learn about genetics, evolution and microscopy.

On certain dates, 30-minute talks known as Biodiversity Workshops are delivered in the Nature Lab of this gallery.

==== Paleontology Gallery ====
This gallery opened in 2023 as part of the museum's permanent exhibition renewal project and is also known as Extinction · Resilience. Around 80 to 100 fossils and replicas are housed in this gallery, with the main highlight being an almost complete Deinonychus fossil. Visitors can also view and interact with two dinosaur animatronics (a Tyrannosaurus rex and a Velociraptor).

==== Jockey Club Environmental Conservation Gallery ====
A gallery consisting of interactive exhibits and games related to the causes of climate change and what humans can do to save the planet.

==== World of Mirrors ====
A house of mirrors. Visitors can view and interact with mirrors to create interesting reflections.

==== Light ====
A colourful gallery in which visitors are encouraged to explore the phenomena of light and colours through interactive exhibits.

==== Mathematics ====
This gallery consists of multiple tables with brain teasers produced by the Oregon Museum of Science and Industry (OMSI).

=== First Floor ===
==== Earth Science Gallery ====
A gallery that explains the earth's formation, structure, and phenomena including plate tectonics and climate change, as well as how natural disasters occur. It also contains samples of minerals and Hong Kong's hexagonal rock columns.

==== AI Gallery ====
Opened in February 2026, it explains the fundamental principles of artificial intelligence and demonstrates practical applications of it, including its integration with creative arts and Chinese culture, as well as its used in healthcare and life sciences. Visitors can experience the capabilities of AI, mainly generative AI, through activities such as music composition, creating AI art, and playing simple games against it.

=== Second Floor ===
==== InnoTech Gallery ====
Opened in February 2026, this gallery introduces five pivotal technologies driving modern innovation:

- quantum technology
- materials technology
- biotechnology
- computers and AI
- robotics

The gallery explains the science principles behind these technologies ranging from quantum computing to advanced DNA editing.

==== Living Tech Gallery ====
Opened in February 2026, this gallery explores how technology is integrated into daily life. Visitors can experience autonomous driving, the endless potential of the Internet of Things, applications of green building materials, and rethinking future possibilities of sustainable diets. The MTR Corporation is a collaborator with the Science Museum here.

=== Former galleries ===
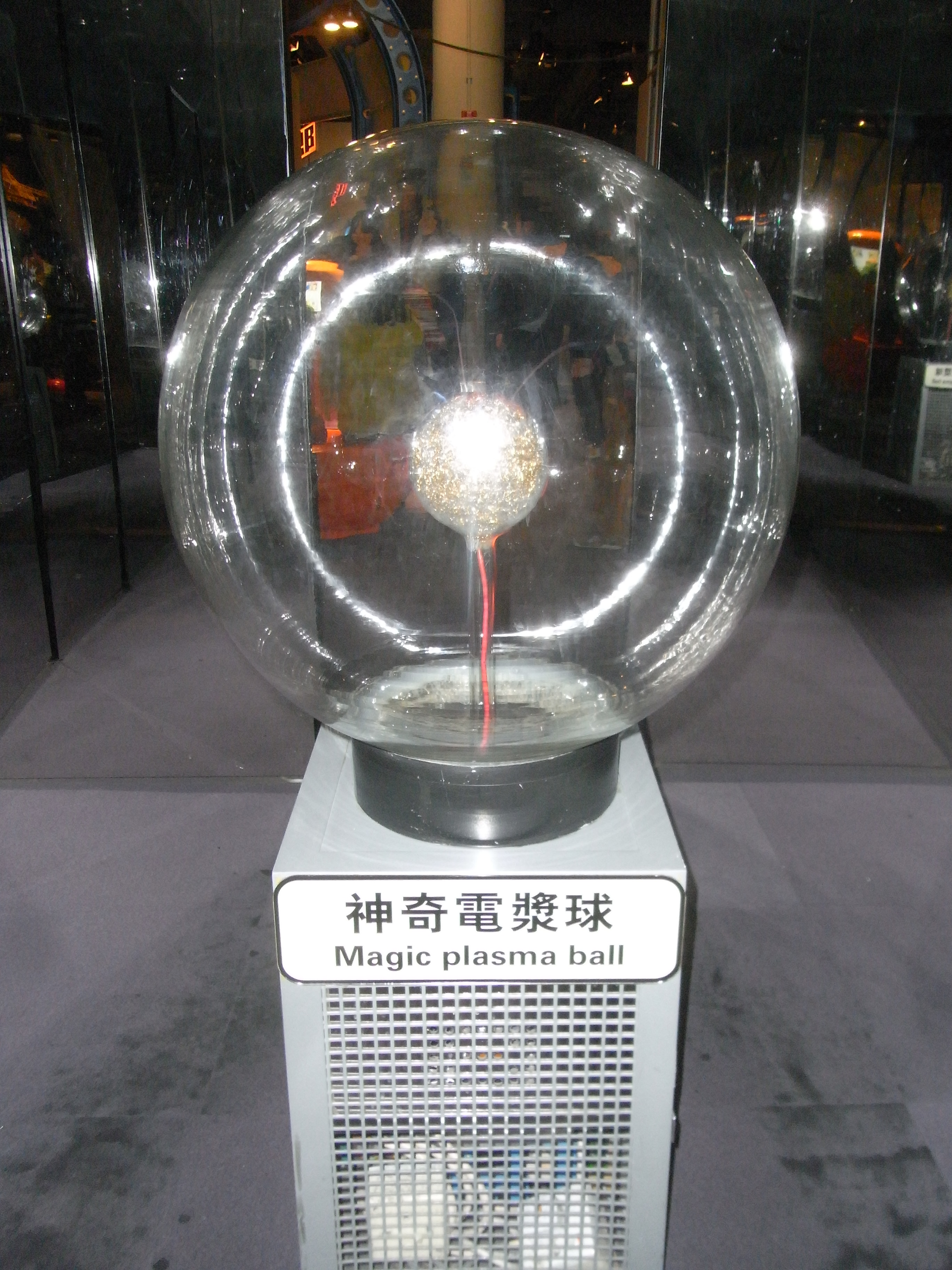
The plasma globe in the former Electricity and Magnetism Gallery.

As of April 2026, these galleries have either been replaced or are temporarily made unavailable due to the museum's permanent exhibition renewal project.

==== Sound and Motion Hall ====
Visitors could investigate the properties of sound and how objects move through interactive exhibits.

==== Electricity and Magnetism Gallery ====
Visitors could interact with exhibitions such as forming electrical circuits and testing out model maglev trains. There was also a dark chamber with a plasma globe in the middle of the gallery.

== Transportation ==
The museum is accessible within walking distance from Exit D1 of Hung Hom station, Exit B2 of Tsim Sha Tsui station or Exit P2 of East Tsim Sha Tsui station on the MTR.

== 2023: planned relocation ==
In late 2023, the Hong Kong government proposed to relocate the HKScM to the site of the Hong Kong Heritage Museum in Sha Tin, and use the site in Tsim Sha Tsui for a new museum that will promote the "development and achievements of China". The Culture, Sports and Tourism Bureau proposed that the new museum would improve adolescents' understanding of China by showcasing Chinese history, the Chinese Communist Party, "the establishment of the new China", Chinese economic reform, and national achievements. However, the relocation was eventually cancelled in 2024 due to intense public opposition.

== See also ==
- Hong Kong Science Park
- Hong Kong Space Museum
- List of buildings and structures in Hong Kong
- List of museums in Hong Kong
