= Hong Kong Correctional Services Museum =

Museum in Stanley, Hong Kong

Coordinates: 22.216267°N 114.218009°E

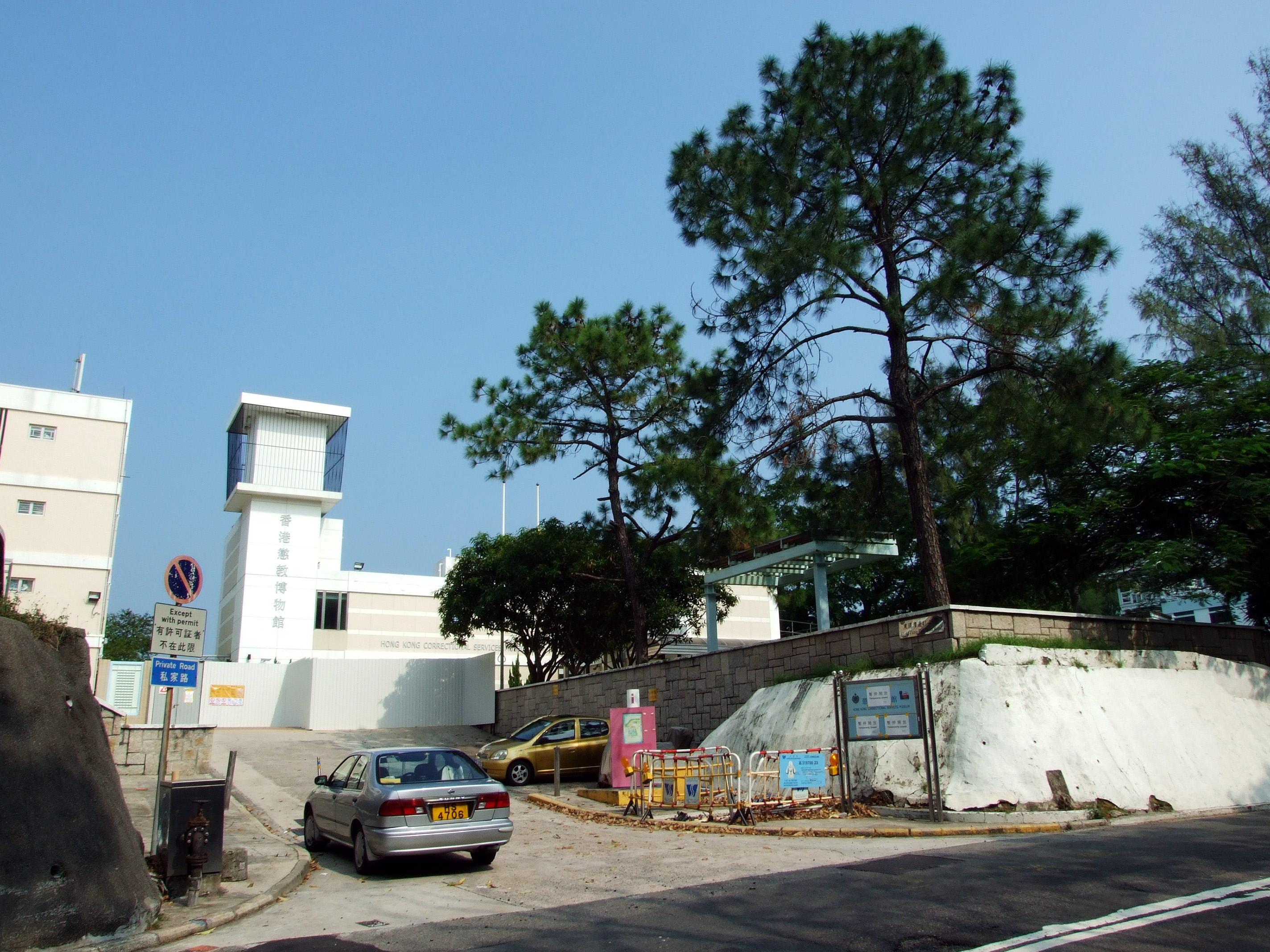
Exterior of the Hong Kong Correctional Services Museum

The Hong Kong Correctional Services Museum (Chinese: 香港懲教博物館) is a museum in Tung Tau Wan Road, Stanley, Hong Kong. It was originally housed in the Staff Training Institute of the Hong Kong Correctional Services Department.

== Description ==
Today it is housed in a two-storey building next to the parade ground of the Staff Training Institute. It has an area of 480 square metres (5,200 sq ft) with a collection of over 600 artifacts representing some 170 years of Hong Kong's criminal and rehabilitative past starting in the Qing dynasty (1644–1911) and extending through the colonial period, when piracy was punishable by death.

Along with ten galleries, the museum contains a mock gallows and two mock cells as well as a mock guard tower on top of the building. One of the galleries displays equipment formerly used for floggings and assorted corporal punishments. An annex for the presentation of correctional and rehabilitative services and for the display of handicrafts produced by prisoners has been added to the museum. Outside the annex is a 200 square metres (2,200 sq ft) lookout point for visitors to savour the scenery of Tai Tam Bay.

The museum is under the management of the Correctional Services Department Staff Training Institute (STI).

== Exhibits ==
There are ten galleries in the museum:

- Gallery 1: Punishment and Imprisonment
- Gallery 2: Prisons History and Development
- Gallery 3: Prisons History and Development (continuation)
- Gallery 4: Inside Prisons
- Gallery 5: Staff Uniform, Insignia and Accoutrement
- Gallery 6: Vietnamese Boat People
- Gallery 7: Home Made Weapons and Unauthorised Articles
- Gallery 8: Staff Events
- Gallery 9: Industries and Vocational Training Section
- Gallery 10: Overseas Cooperation and Experience Sharing

Also on display are:

- two mock cells
- one mock gallows.

== Opening hours ==
Tuesdays to Sundays: 10:00 am to 5:00 pm
The Museum is closed on Mondays and Public Holidays.
Group tours are available.

== Transport to the museum ==
- Bus No. 6, 6X or 260 from Central
- Bus No. 14 from Sai Wan Ho
- Bus No. 63 from North Point
- Bus No. 65 from North Point (Sundays and Public Holidays only)
- Bus No. 73 from Wah Fu Estate
- Bus No. 314 from Siu Sai Wan (Sundays and Public Holidays only)
- Bus No. 399 from South Horizons (Sundays and Public Holidays only)
- Bus No. 973 from Tsim Sha Tsui (via Western Tunnel)
- Public Light Bus No. 16X from Chai Wan
- Public Light Bus No. 40 from Causeway Bay
- Public Light Bus No. 52 from Aberdeen

== Gallery ==
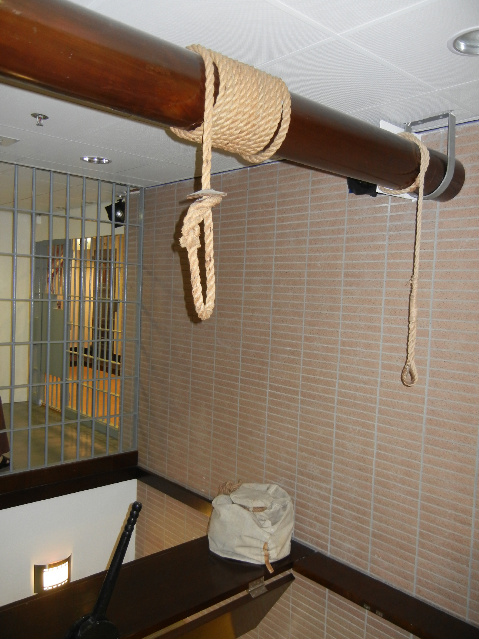
Mock gallows at the museum.

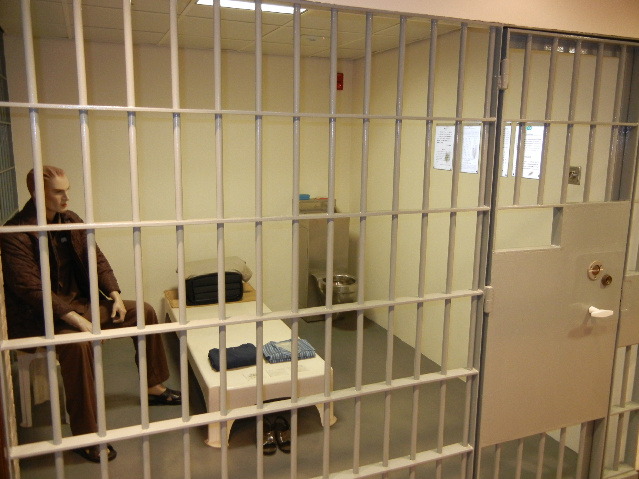
Former cell.

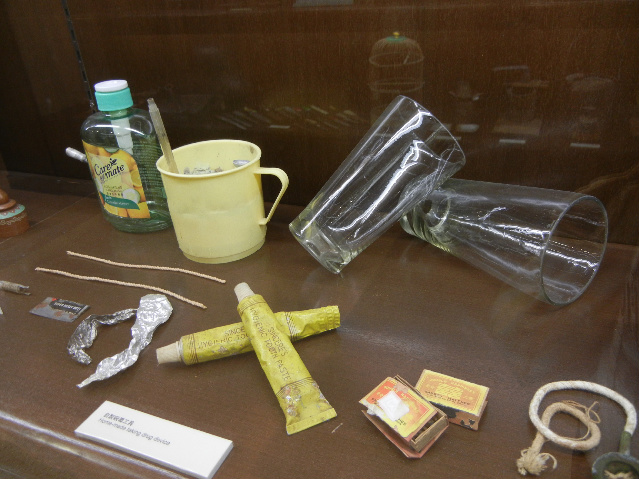
Tools used for drug making by former inmates.

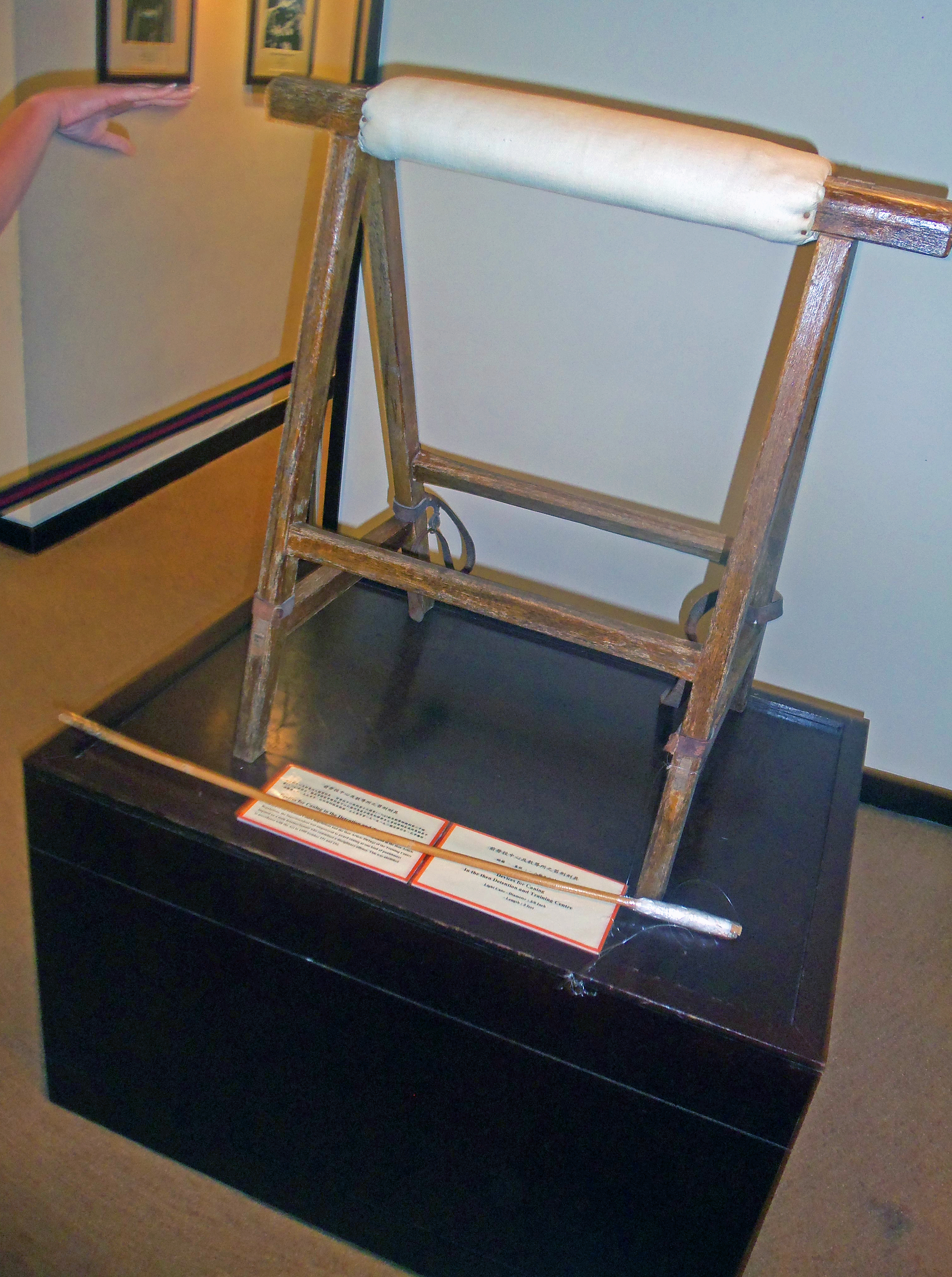
Caning stand and cane.

== See also ==
- List of museums in Hong Kong
