= Sun Museum =

Museum in Hong Kong

Coordinates: 22.310815°N 114.219439°E

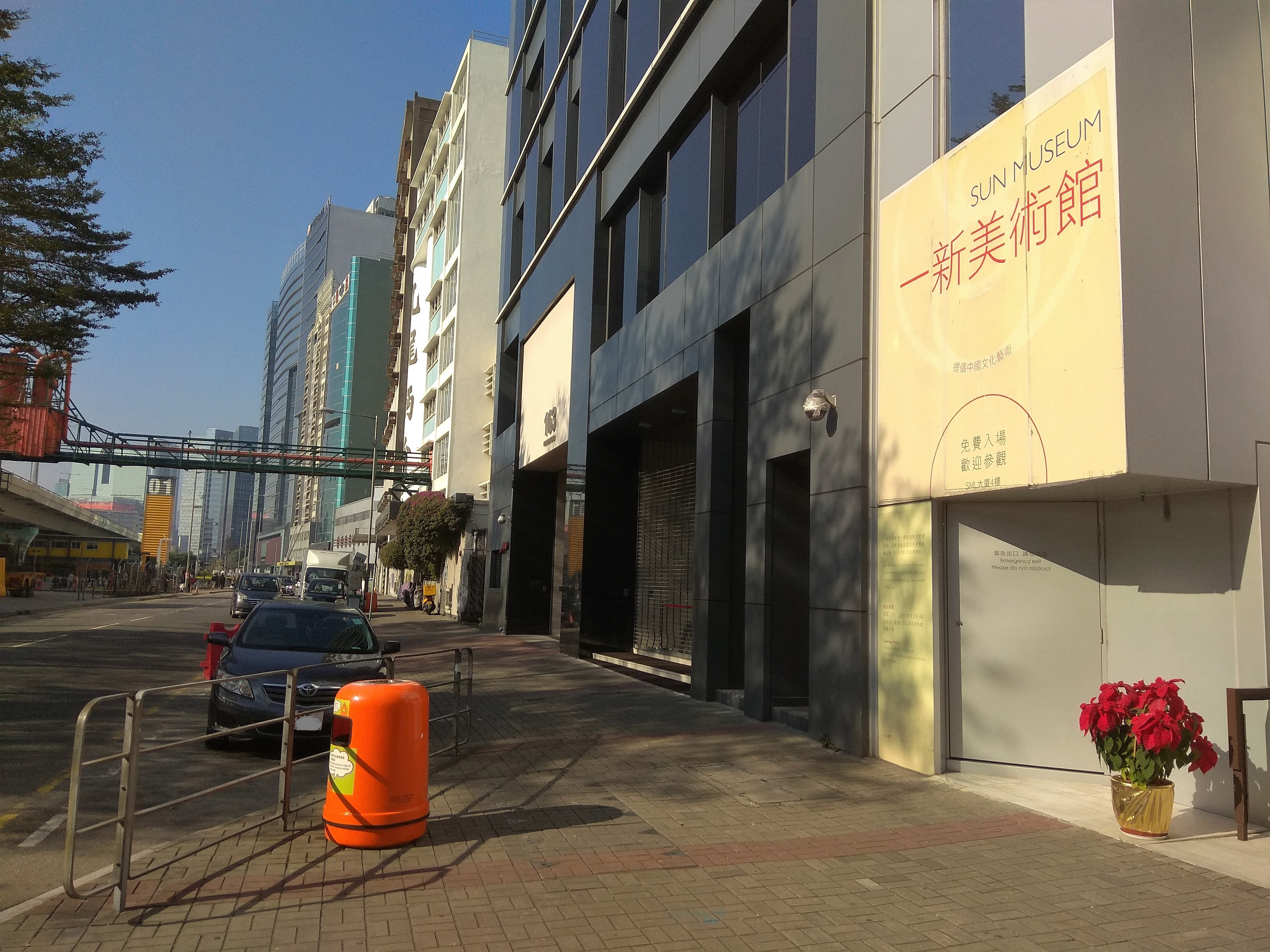
Sun Museum sign in Hoi Bun Road.

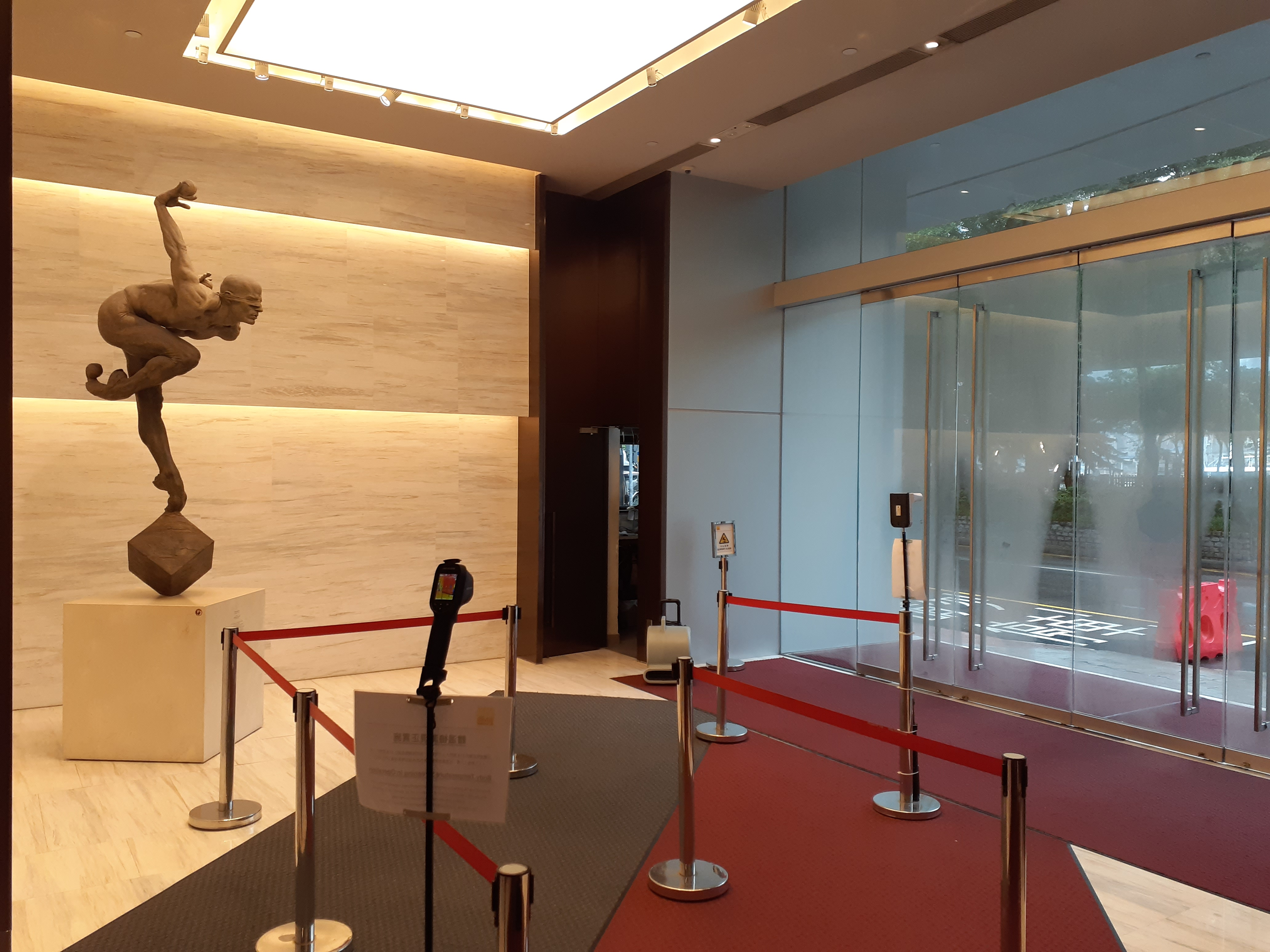
Museum entrance.

The Sun Museum (Chinese: 一新美術館) is a non-profit, independent museum in Hong Kong, established by the Simon Suen Foundation (孫少文基金會). It aims to promote a better understanding of Chinese arts and culture. The museum is located at G/F & 1/F, Artisan House, 1 Sai Yuen Lane, Sai Ying Pun, Hong Kong. It was previously located at 4/F, SML Tower, 165 Hoi Bun Road, Kwun Tong between 2015 and 2024.

== See also ==
- List of museums in Hong Kong
