= Hong Kong Museum of Education =

Museum in New Territories, Hong Kong, China

- 香港教育博物館
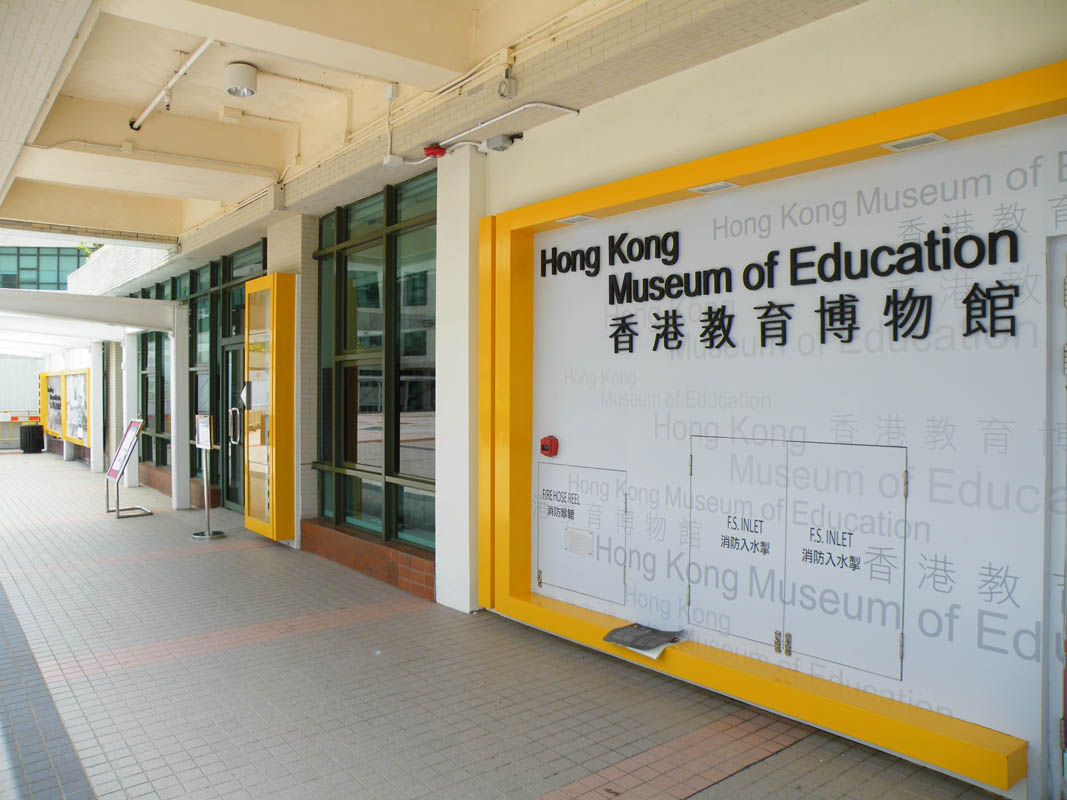
- Established: 15 May 2009; 17 years ago
- Location: Block D1, Podium Level, The Education University of Hong Kong, 10 Lo Ping Road, Tai Po, New Territories, Hong Kong
- Coordinates: 22°28′8.5″N 114°11′41.5″E
- Type: museum
- Chairperson: Prof John Lee Chi-kin
- Curator: Kevinna Deng Ying-yu
- Website: museum.eduhk.hk

Hong Kong Museum of Education
- Traditional Chinese: 香港教育博物館
Transcriptions
Yue: Cantonese
- Yale Romanization: Hēung góng gaau yuhk bok maht gún
- Jyutping: Hoeng1 gong2 gaau3 juk6 bok3 mat6 gun2

The Hong Kong Museum of Education (HKME) is a museum in Tai Po, New Territories, Hong Kong. The museum focuses on the history and development of education in the territory. The museum is located within the campus of the Education University of Hong Kong.

== Exhibitions ==
The museum displays artifacts and material related to education and its history, which includes booklets, bulletins, certificates, photos, teaching tools, etc.

== History ==
The museum was established on 15 May 2009.

== Transportation ==
The museum is accessible by bus from Tai Po Market station of MTR.

== See also ==
- List of museums in Hong Kong
