= Hong Kong Baptist University =

Public university in Kowloon, Hong Kong

- 香港浸會大學
- Emblem of HKBU
- Motto: 篤信力行
- Motto in English: Faith and Perseverance
- Type: Public
- Established: 6 March 1956; 70 years ago (as Hong Kong Baptist College); 16 November 1994; 32 years ago (granted full university status)
- Affiliations: ASAIHL; ACUCA; BHUA; GHMUA
- Chairman: Clement C J Chen
- Chancellor: John Lee Ka-chiu
- President: Alexander Wai
- Vice-president: Albert Chau (Teaching & Learning); Christine CHOW (Administration and Secretary)
- Provost: Rick Wong (Interim)
- Academic staff: 1,119 (2022-2023)
- Administrative staff: 2,134 (2022-2023)
- Students: 12,188 (2022-2023)
- Undergraduates: 7,251 (2022-2023)
- Postgraduates: 4,937 (2022-2023)
- Location: 224 Waterloo Road, Kowloon Tsai, Hong Kong; 22°20′20″N 114°10′55″E
- Colours: Blue
- Website: hkbu.edu.hk

Chinese name
- Simplified Chinese: 香港浸会大学
- Traditional Chinese: 香港浸會大學
Transcriptions
Standard Mandarin
- Hanyu Pinyin: Xiānggǎng Jìnhuì Dàxué
Yue: Cantonese
- Yale Romanization: Hēunggóng Jamwuih Daaihhohk
- Jyutping: Hoeng1gong2 Zam3wui6 Daai6hok6

Hong Kong Baptist University (HKBU) is a public university with a Christian education heritage in Kowloon Tong, Kowloon, Hong Kong.

The university was established as Hong Kong Baptist College with the support of American Baptists, who provided both operating and construction funds and personnel to the school in its early years. It became a public, non-religious college in 1983. It was granted university status and became Hong Kong Baptist University in 1994.

HKBU has five main campuses: Ho Sin Hang Campus (1966), Shaw Campus (1995), Baptist University Road Campus (1998), Kai Tak Campus (2005), and Shek Mun Campus (2006) for the College of International Education and the Hong Kong Baptist University Affiliated School Wong Kam Fai Secondary and Primary School. The first three campuses are located in the urban heart of Kowloon Tsai, while the Kai Tak Campus is located on Kwun Tong Road and the Shek Mun Campus in the Shek Mun area of Sha Tin District near Shek Mun station.

In 2005, the university and Beijing Normal University jointly established the Beijing Normal–Hong Kong Baptist University (BNBU) in Zhuhai, Guangdong, China. The college was the first higher education institution founded through collaboration between a Mainland university and a Hong Kong university.

== History ==
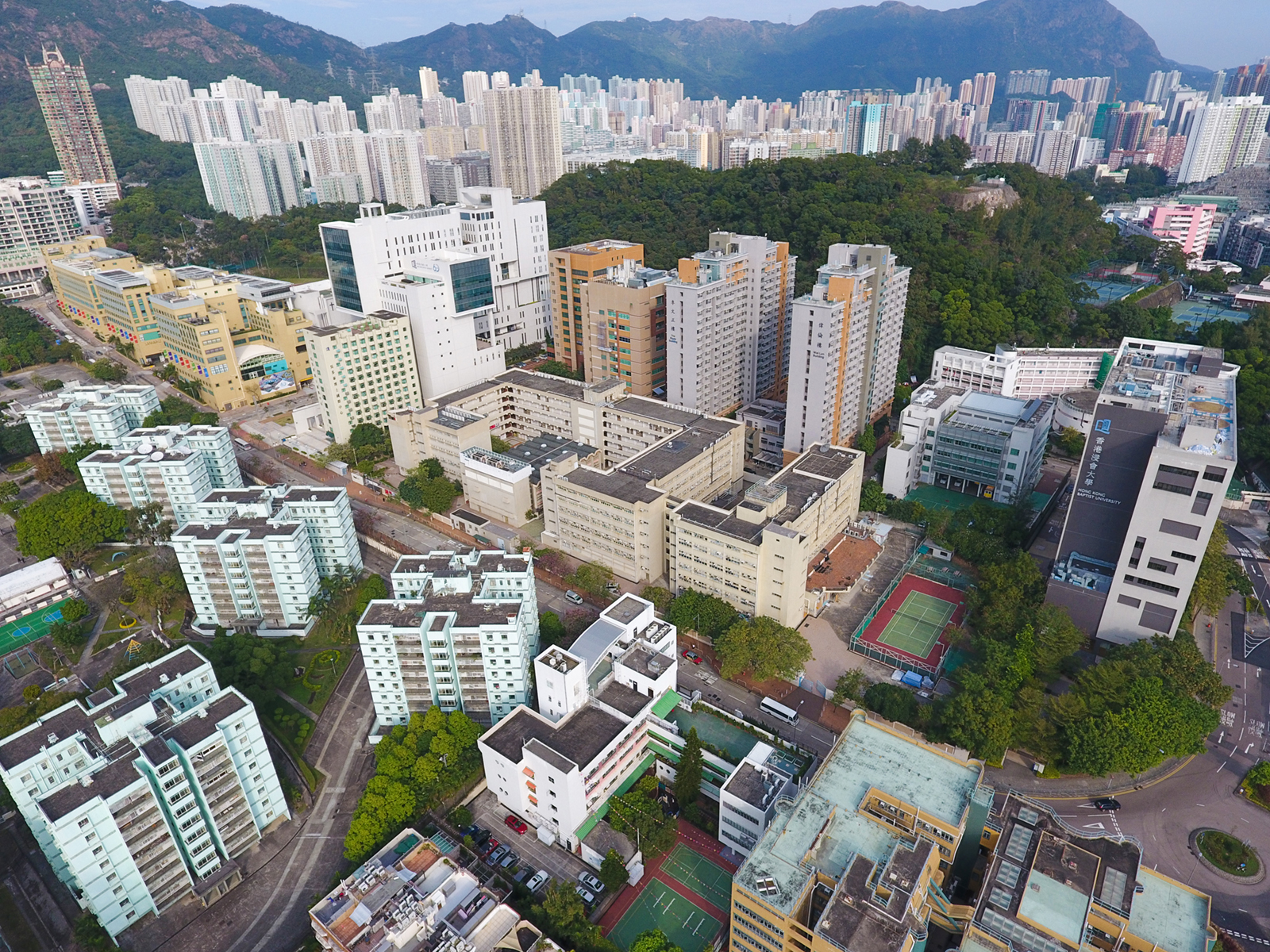
Hong Kong Baptist University in December 2016

The Hong Kong Baptist College was opened on 11 September 1956 on the premises of the Pui Ching Middle School, a Baptist-affiliated secondary school, with an initial enrolment of 152 students. In 1957, the government gave the college land on Waterloo Road to build a permanent campus, which was completed in 1966.

The Hong Kong Baptist College Bill 1983 was passed by the Legislative Council on 10 August 1983. The college previously fell under the purview of the Post Secondary Colleges Ordinance and received funding from the Education Department. After this bill became law, the college instead began to receive funding from the University and Polytechnic Grants Committee.

The third reading of the Hong Kong Baptist College (Amendment) Bill was passed by the Legislative Council on 16 November 1994, transforming the college into the Hong Kong Baptist University.

== University identities ==
=== Emblem ===
The emblem of Hong Kong Baptist University consists of three pictorial elements: the Bible, waves and knots. The Bible symbolises the unique quality of Christian education which includes moral and spiritual training in addition to academic education. The waves, on the other hand, symbolise both Hong Kong's geographic nature as an island while echoing Confucius' dictum that "the wise love water" and the University's continuing effort to improve its educational quality. The knots, the final symbol, illustrate that within God's embrace, Christians are harmoniously linked and loved.

=== Logo ===
The logo, embodying a book and water motifs, was adopted after the institution was granted its university status in 1994. The acronym "BU" coupled with the outlined book on the logo resembles the Chinese characters of welcome (迎) and progress (進), conceptualising the merging of eastern and western cultures. The design of the logo was commended at a design competition held in October 1996. The Hong Kong Designers Association awarded a Certificate of Merit at the Design 96 Show to Kan & Lau Design Consultants for creating the logo.

== Governance ==
Prior to Hong Kong's handover, the colony's governor was the de jure chancellor of the university. That role has been assumed by the Chief Executive of Hong Kong following the handover.

The chief executive's role as the university's Chancellor is enshrined in the Hong Kong Baptist University Ordinance.

For a list of pre- and post-handover university chancellors, refer to the articles for the Governor of Hong Kong and the Chief executive of Hong Kong.

== Rankings and reputation ==
University rankings

Global – Overall
- ARWU World: 601-700 (2026)
- QS World: 216 (2027)
- QS Under 50: 23 (2021)
- THE World: 205 (2027)
- THE Young Universities: 46 (2024)
- USNWR Global: 371 (2026)

Regional – Overall
- QS Asia: 50 (2027)
- THE Asia: 40 (2026)
- USNWR Asia: 91 (2026)

HKBU was ranked 244th worldwide by the QS World University Ranking 2026, and 201–250th worldwide by the Times Higher Education World University Rankings 2026. It was previously ranked 111th worldwide in the THE WUR 2011.

The QS Graduate Employability Ranking 2022 placed HKBU at 301–500th worldwide.

== Major facilities ==
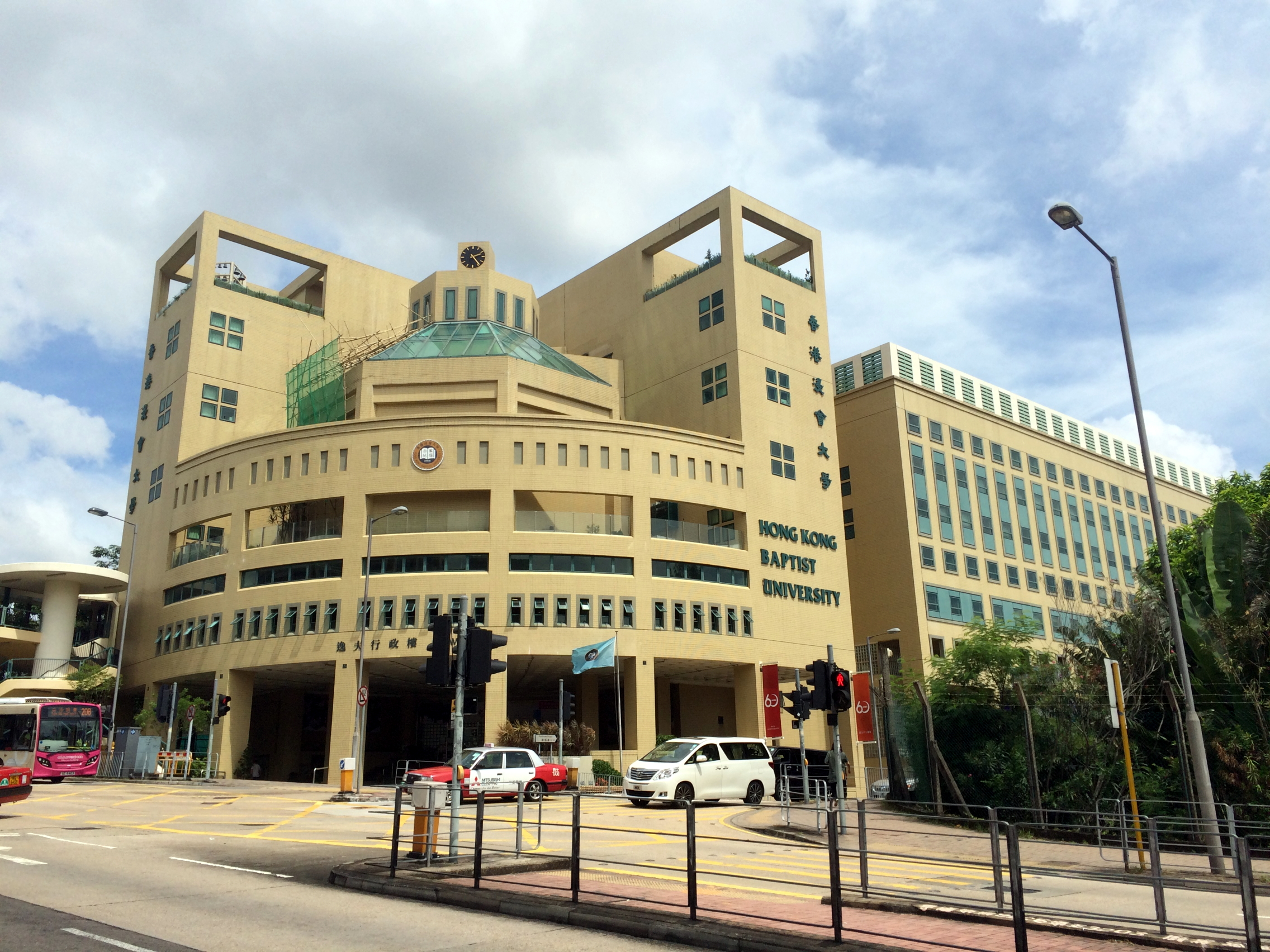
The Shaw Campus in July 2016

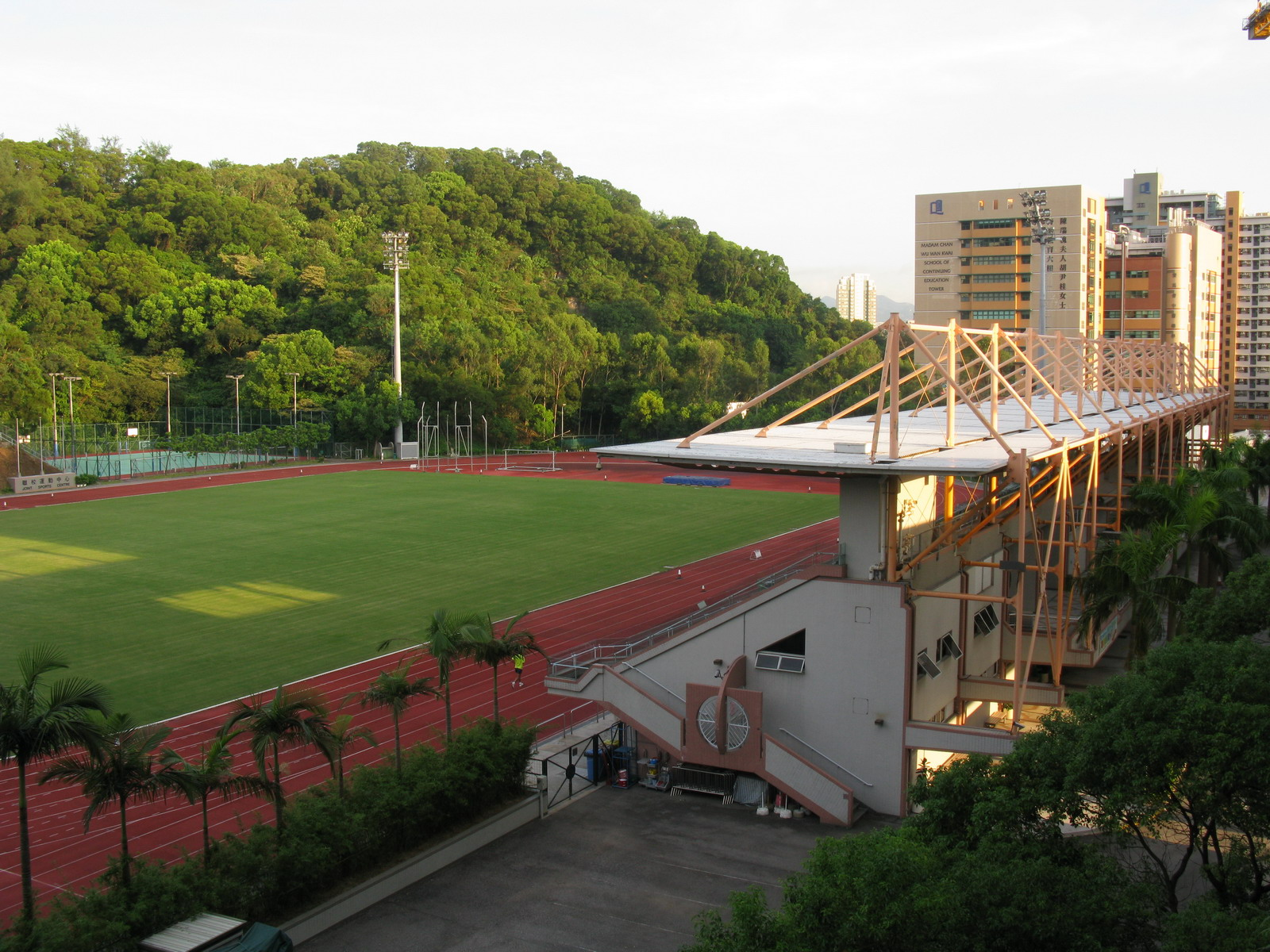
Joint Sports Centre in August 2008

The campus is located within Kowloon City.

=== Academic Community Hall ===
The Academic Community Hall (AC Hall) is an auditorium located in the university. It was opened in May 1978 with a seating capacity of 1,346. Originally, the first president and co-founder of the university, Dr. Lam Chi-fung, conceived the idea of building a hall for university functions. In 1970, on the occasion of their golden wedding anniversary, Dr. and Mrs. Lam donated half a million dollars towards the construction of the auditorium. A local architect, Eric Cumine, took charge of the project. However, Dr. Lam died the following year before the project got underway. The Board of Governors decided to honour Dr. Lam by expanding the planned auditorium into a much larger scale project – the development of the Lam Chi-fung Memorial Building. As a part of the project, the Academic Community Hall would serve as a cultural centre for the university and its surrounding community, thus providing a direct link between town and gown.

=== Communication and Visual Art Building ===
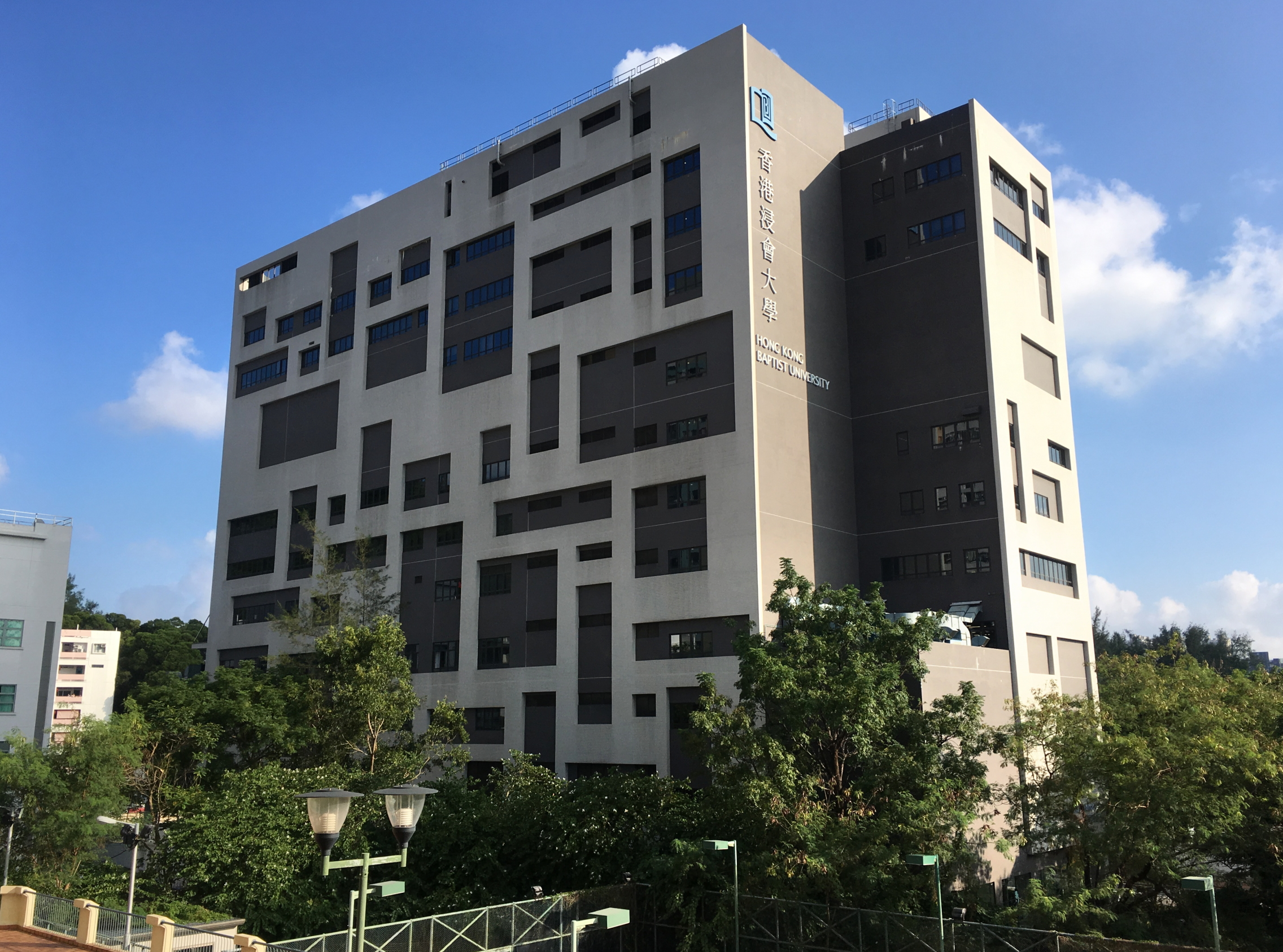
Communication and Visual Arts Building in October 2016

The Communication and Visual Art Building is located in 5 Hereford Road, Kowloon Tong. The building was built for the School of Communication and Academy of Visual Arts.

=== Library ===
HKBU Library is an essential component of the University, providing academic resources, support for learning, and research assistance to the HKBU community. It was established concurrently with the founding of Hong Kong Baptist College in 1956. As the institution grew and became a full-fledged university in 1994, the library expanded its collections and services.

The College's first library was called the Bessie Fleming Library, after the wife of donor William Fleming. In 1975 the Lui Ming Choi Library was added and became the circulating library, while the Bessie Fleming Library became a reference library. In December 1984 the Fong Shu Chuen Library was opened. In 1995, the Au Shue Hung Memorial Library (AML) replaced the Fong Shu Chuen Library as the main library serving the University. This library now houses most of the collection and study areas. Apart from the AML, there are three branch libraries: the European Documentation Centre (established in 1996), the Dr. Stephen Riady Chinese Medicine Library (opened in 2001), and the Shek Mun Campus Library (opened in 2006).

With the advent of the digital era, HKBU Library has placed more emphasis on electronic resources to facilitate learning and research. The physical collection has been gradually reduced in size, while investments in digital information resources including through digitization have been increased. In recent years, the library has committed to accelerating research and knowledge transfer by fostering an open access culture and enhancing the visibility of HKBU research output.

== Students' residences ==
The Student Residence Halls of HKBU are located at the Baptist University Road campus:

- Ching-Ling Soong Hall, (C.L. Soong Hall, 宋慶齡堂)
- Chen-Ning Yang Hall, (C.N. Yang Hall, 楊振寧堂)
- Shu-Ren Zhou Hall, (S.R. Zhou Hall, 周樹人堂)
- Yuan-Pei Cai Hall, (Y.P. Cai Hall, 蔡元培堂)
- Village Care Halls

== See also ==
- Dr & Mrs Hung Hin Shiu Museum of Chinese Medicine
- Education in Hong Kong
- List of universities in Hong Kong
- Lam Chi-fung
