= Quarry Bay Park =

Urban park in Quarry Bay, Hong Kong

Coordinates: 22.2889°N 114.2173°E

- 鰂魚涌公園
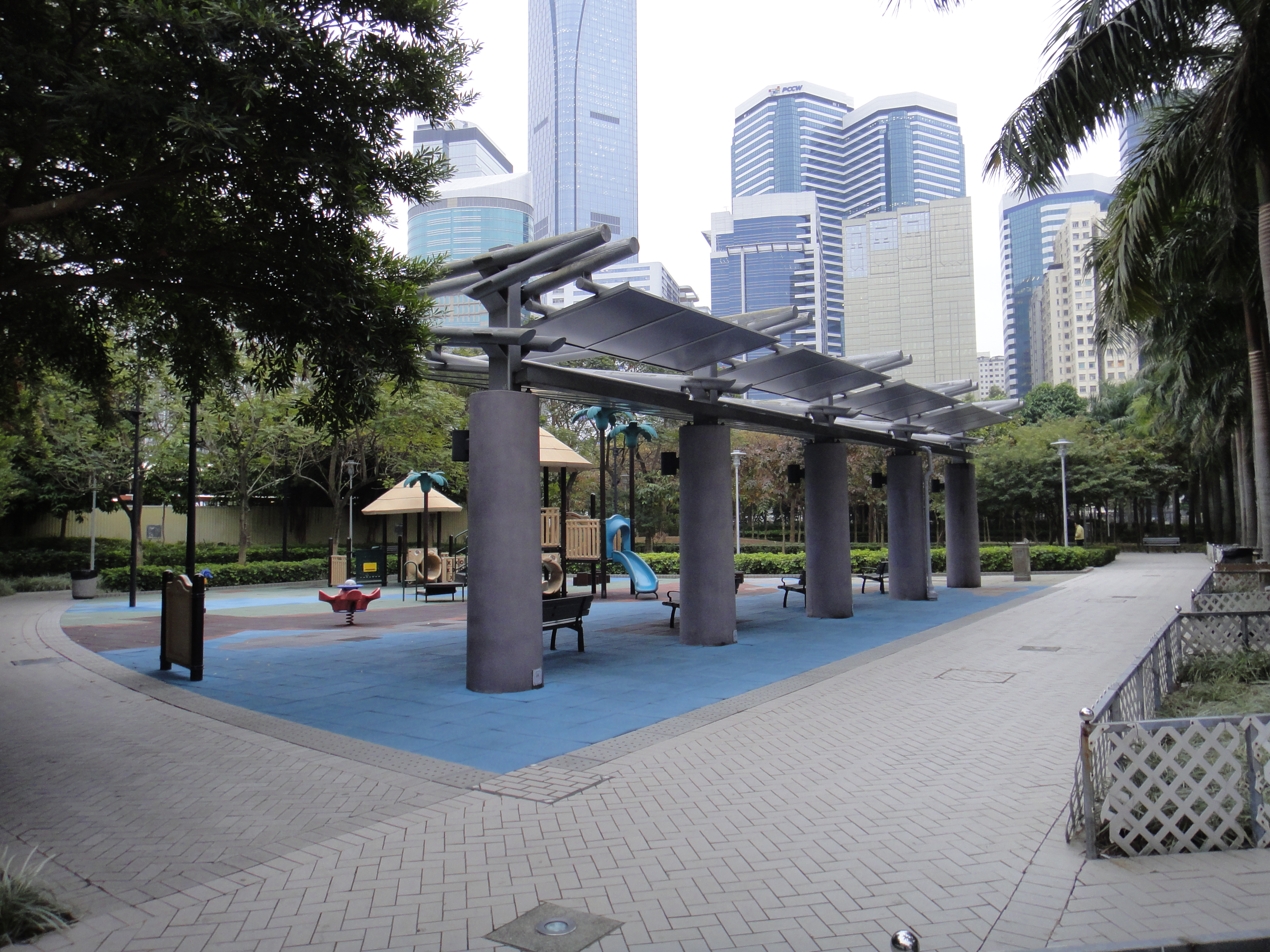
- Interactive map of Quarry Bay Park
- Location: Quarry Bay, Hong Kong
- Opened: 17 June 1994; 32 years ago
- Operator: Leisure and Cultural Services Department
- Open: Year round
- Public transit: Tai Koo station Quarry Bay station Hong Kong Tramways

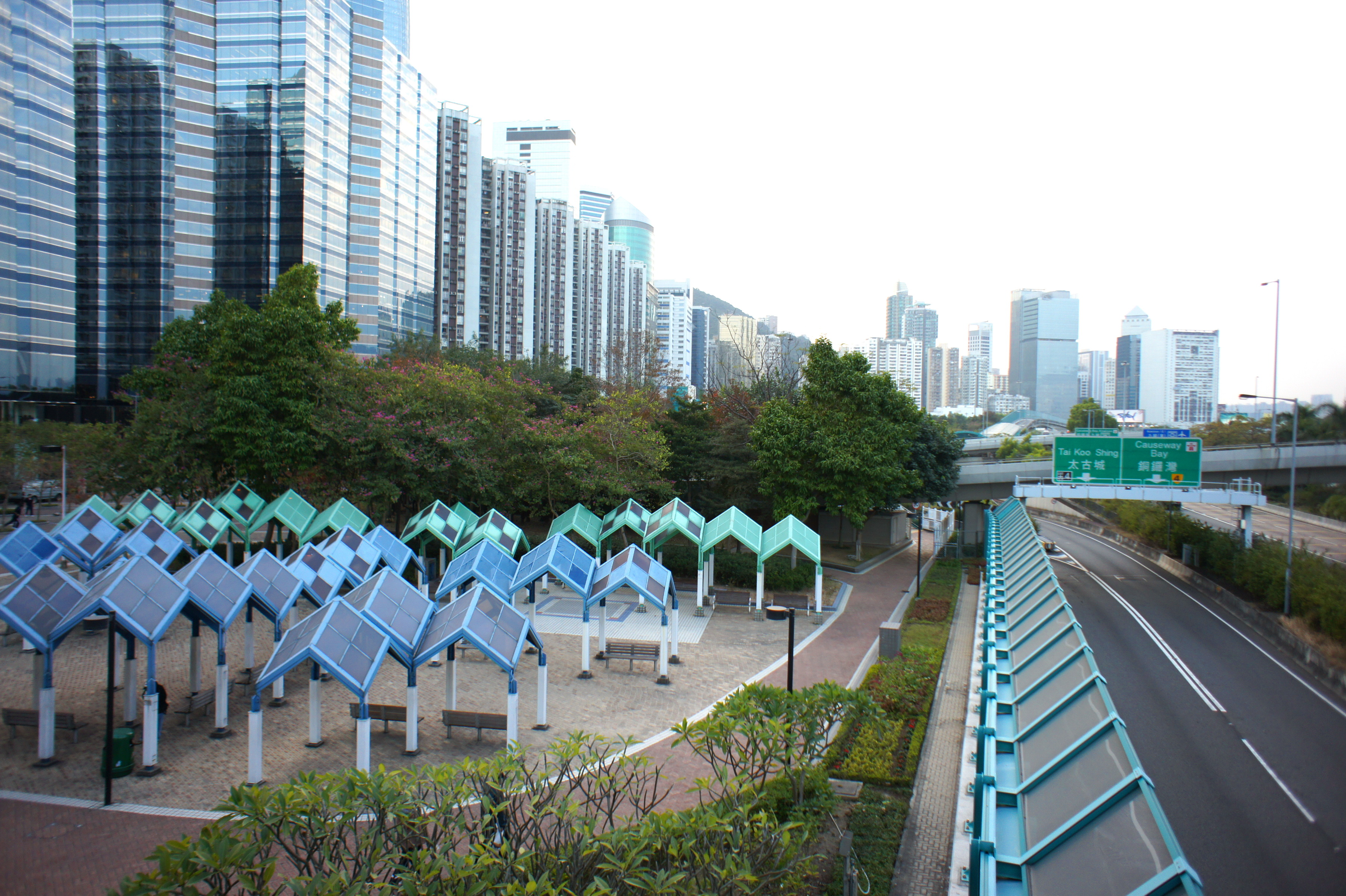
Arbor in Phase One of Quarry Bay Park. On the left is the Taikoo Shing private residential development, and the Island Eastern Corridor is on the right.

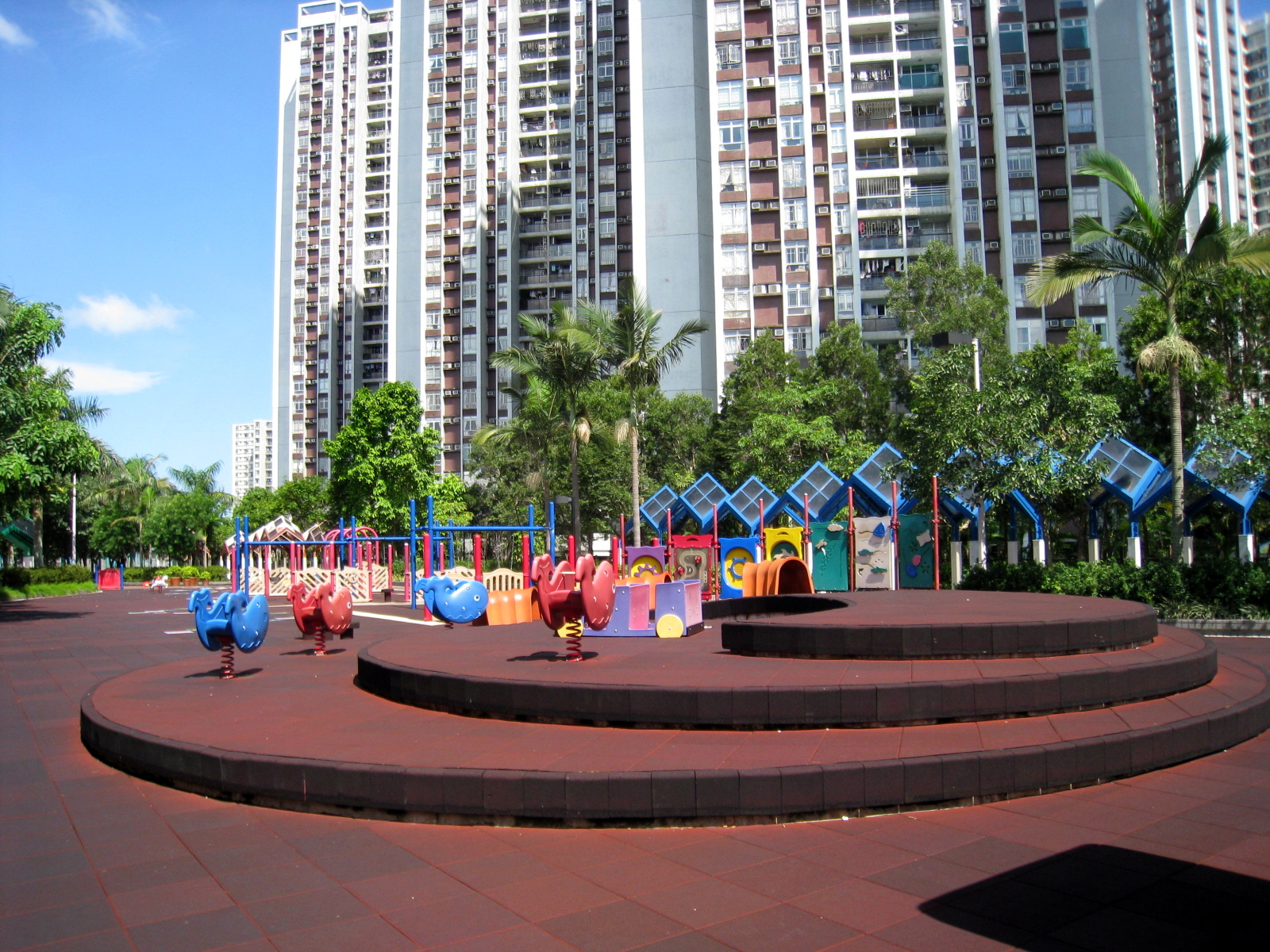
A playground inside the park

Quarry Bay Park (Chinese: 鰂魚涌公園) is an urban park located in the Quarry Bay area of Hong Kong Island's Eastern District. It lies between the waterfront and the Tai Koo Shing housing estate, and covers around 9.79 hectares (24.2 acres). The park is managed by the Leisure and Cultural Services Department of the Hong Kong Government.

== History ==
Quarry Bay Park was planned by the former Urban Council in the 1980s on newly reclaimed land, in concert with major infrastructure development in the area, including the Island Eastern Corridor and the portal of the Eastern Harbour Crossing. The park is divided by this infrastructure into several disparate sites. The total planned extent of the park was around 15 hectares and certain sites have yet to be developed.

Phase One of the park, which opened to the public on 17 June 1994, covers around 9.79 hectares (24.2 acres).

In 2009 four workers at Quarry Bay Park were fined for conspiracy to defraud. A senior amenities assistant and three of his subordinates had lodged numerous funding requests with the Architectural Services Department for nonexistent small repairs work. These small sums were not used for repairs but were collected to install staff toilets and sinks in the park management office.

The planned second and third phases of the park will be located adjacent to Hoi Chak Street (海澤街) in Quarry Bay according to plans published in 2010. However, due to the land being then occupied by a police vehicle pound and examination centre along with the temporary vehicle depot of the Food and Environmental Hygiene Department (FEHD) as well as a temporary works area for the Water Supplies Department (WSD), expansion plans were suspended. In 2012, the Hong Kong Police Force and the FEHD permanently relocated to Chai Wan. However, the WSD requested that the Eastern District Council extend their lease for a further three years. The council questioned whether the WSD had taken the problem seriously. This stalled expansion plans while the council continued to object to the request. A WSD spokesmen told local media that the 4,000-square-metre (43,000 sq ft) temporary works area was provided to a contractor for material storage in case of emergencies such as mains bursts. The Lands Department offered WSD a 2,000-square-metre (22,000 sq ft) temporary site in Chai Wan, but alternative land was needed due to size requirements. The Lands Department was unable to find another suitable site for WSD on Hong Kong Island as most of the area had been developed or earmarked for future use. To sustain the water supply service, the WSD concluded that their lease extension was necessary.

== Fireboat Alexander Grantham Exhibition Gallery ==
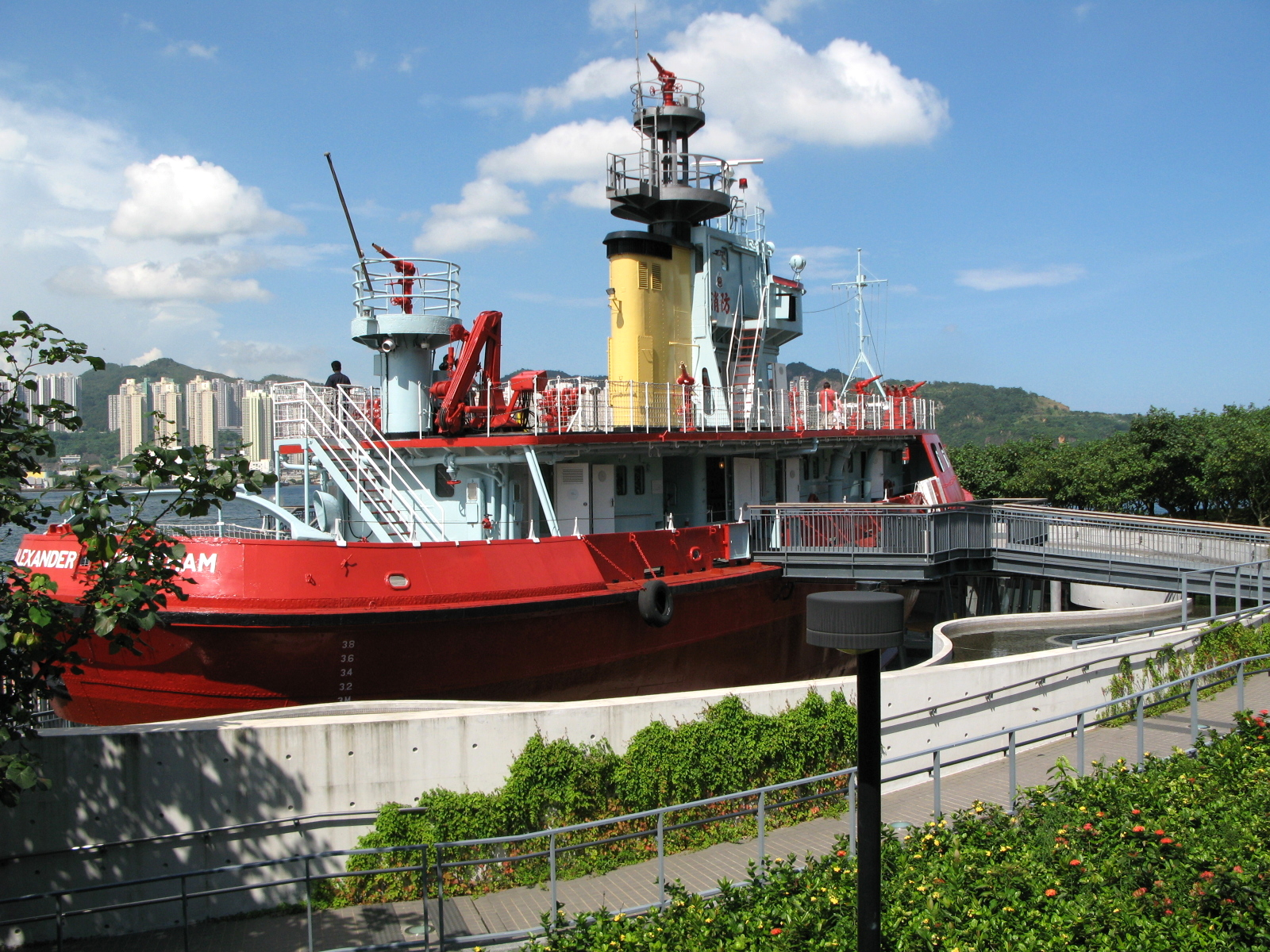
Fireboat Alexander Grantham Exhibition Gallery

On 10 March 2006, a retired fire-boat was successfully hoisted into its new permanent home on the central concourse of the park, where it was converted to the Fireboat Alexander Grantham Exhibition Gallery. The gallery opened to the public as a museum in 2007.

The gallery displays a number of unique firefighting artefacts, which offer a wealth of information in multimedia formats to enhance visitors' understanding of marine rescue work in Hong Kong. It closes every Tuesdays (except on public holidays), and the first and second days of Chinese New Year. Entry is free.

== See also ==
- List of urban public parks and gardens in Hong Kong
