= Leisure and Cultural Services Department =

Hong Kong government department

- 康樂及文化事務署

Agency overview
- Formed: 1 January 2000; 26 years ago
- Preceding agency: The leisure and cultural functions of: Urban Council; Regional Council
- Jurisdiction: Hong Kong
- Headquarters: Leisure and Cultural Services Headquarters, 1-3 Pai Tau Street, Sha Tin, Hong Kong
- Employees: 10254 (establishment) (March 2026)
- Agency executive: Ms Manda CHAN Wing-man, JP, Director
- Parent agency: Culture, Sports & Tourism Bureau
- Child agency: Hong Kong Public Libraries
- Website: www.lcsd.gov.hk

Leisure and Cultural Services Department
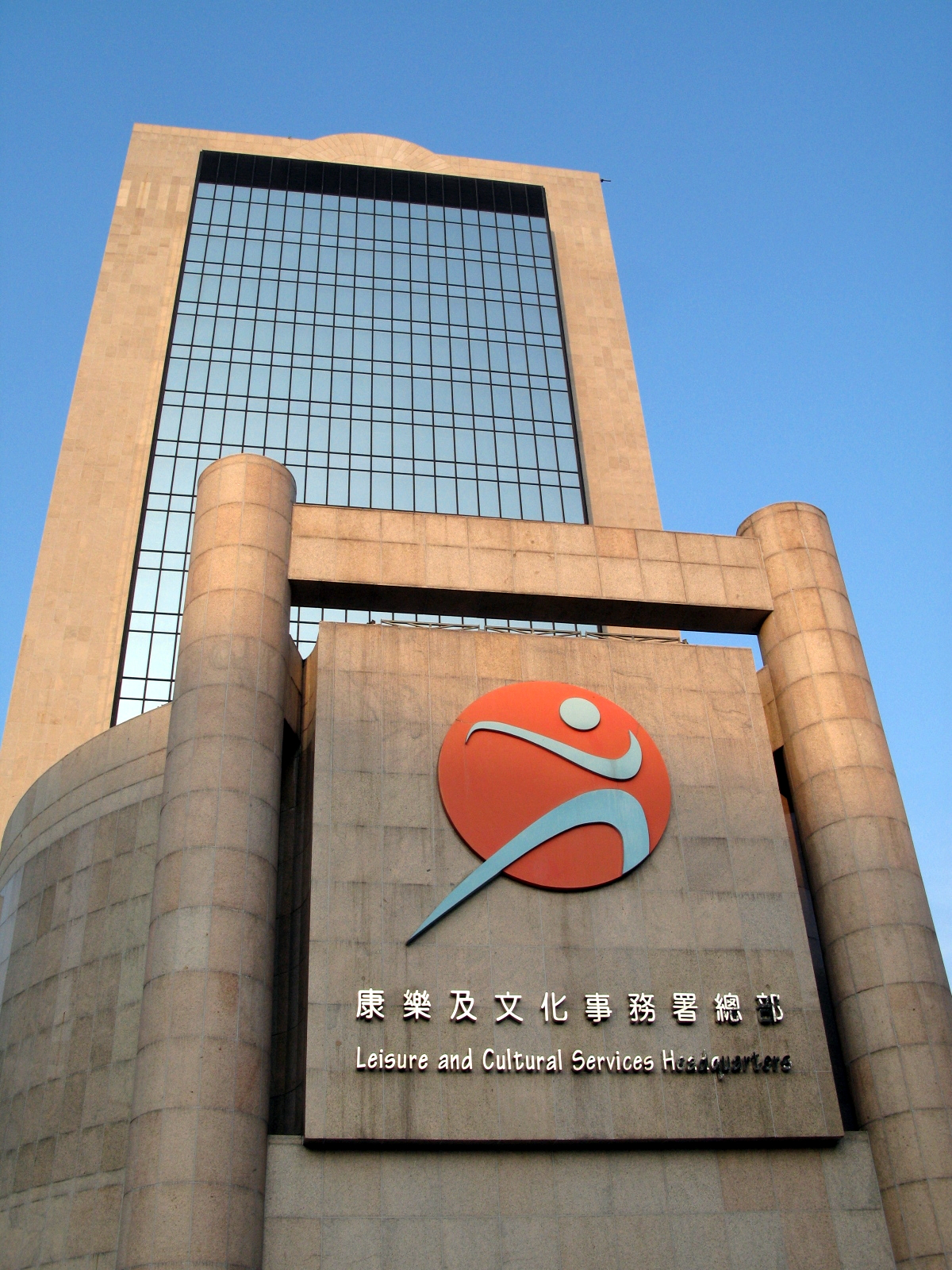
- LCSD headquarters
- Traditional Chinese: 康樂及文化事務署
- Simplified Chinese: 康乐及文化事务署
Transcriptions
Standard Mandarin
- Hanyu Pinyin: Kānglè jí Wénhuà Shìwù Shǔ
Yue: Cantonese
- Yale Romanization: Hōng lohk gahp màhn fa sih mouh syúh
- Jyutping: Hong^{1} lok^{6} gap^{6} man^{4} faa^{3} si^{6} mou^{6} syu^{5}
- IPA: [hɔ́ːŋlɔ̀ːk kɐ̀p mɐ̏nfāː ɕìmòutɕʰy̬ː]

The Leisure and Cultural Services Department (LCSD), is a department in the Government of Hong Kong. It reports to the Culture, Sports & Tourism Bureau, headed by the Secretary for Culture, Sports and Tourism.

It provides leisure and cultural activities for the people of Hong Kong, which was also one of the tasks of the former Urban Council, and Regional Council. It manages various public facilities around Hong Kong including public libraries, swimming pools, sports centres, parks, beaches and waterfront areas. The well-known Hong Kong Cultural Centre and Hong Kong Space Museum are among several museums also managed by the department.

== List of Directors for LCSD ==
- Thomas Chow Tat-ming (2000–2009)
- Betty Fung Ching Suk-yee, JP (2009–2014)
- Michelle Li Mei-sheung, JP (2014–2019)
- Vincent Liu Ming-kwong, JP (2019-2024)
- Manda Chan Wing-man, JP (2024-present)

== Facilities and Services ==
=== Museums ===
There are fifteen museums and two art spaces under the management of the LCSD:

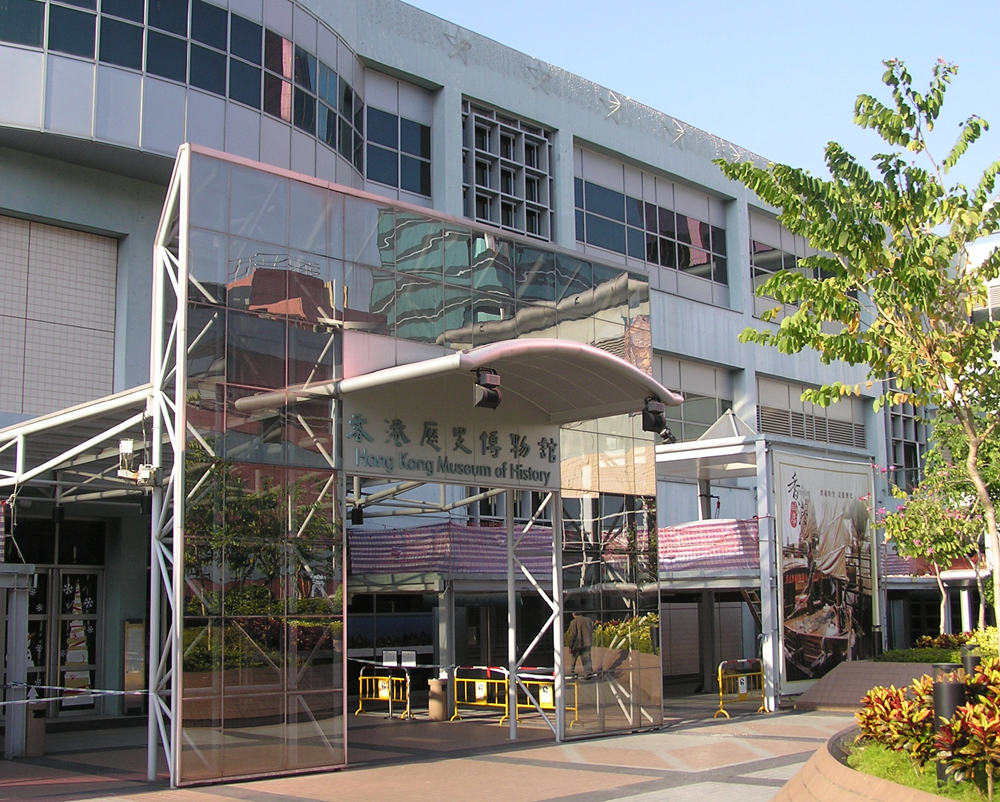
Hong Kong Museum of History

- Dr Sun Yat-sen Museum
- Fireboat Alexander Grantham Exhibition Gallery
- Flagstaff House Museum of Teaware
- Hong Kong Film Archive
- Hong Kong Heritage Museum
- Hong Kong Museum of Art
- Hong Kong Museum of the War of Resistance and Coastal Defence
- Hong Kong Museum of History
- Hong Kong Railway Museum
- Hong Kong Science Museum
- Hong Kong Space Museum
- Hong Kong Visual Arts Centre
- Law Uk Folk Museum
- Lei Cheng Uk Han Tomb Museum
- Oi!
- Sam Tung Uk Museum
- Sheung Yiu Folk Museum

=== Performing Arts venues ===
The LCSD operates fifteen performing arts venues.

=== Public Libraries ===
Hong Kong Public Libraries (HKPL) consists of 67 static and 10 mobile libraries offering a total collection of 12.3 million items of books, audio/video materials, newspapers and periodicals, etc. Among the most significant libraries are the Hong Kong Central Library, Kowloon Public Library, and Sha Tin Public Library.

=== Parks ===
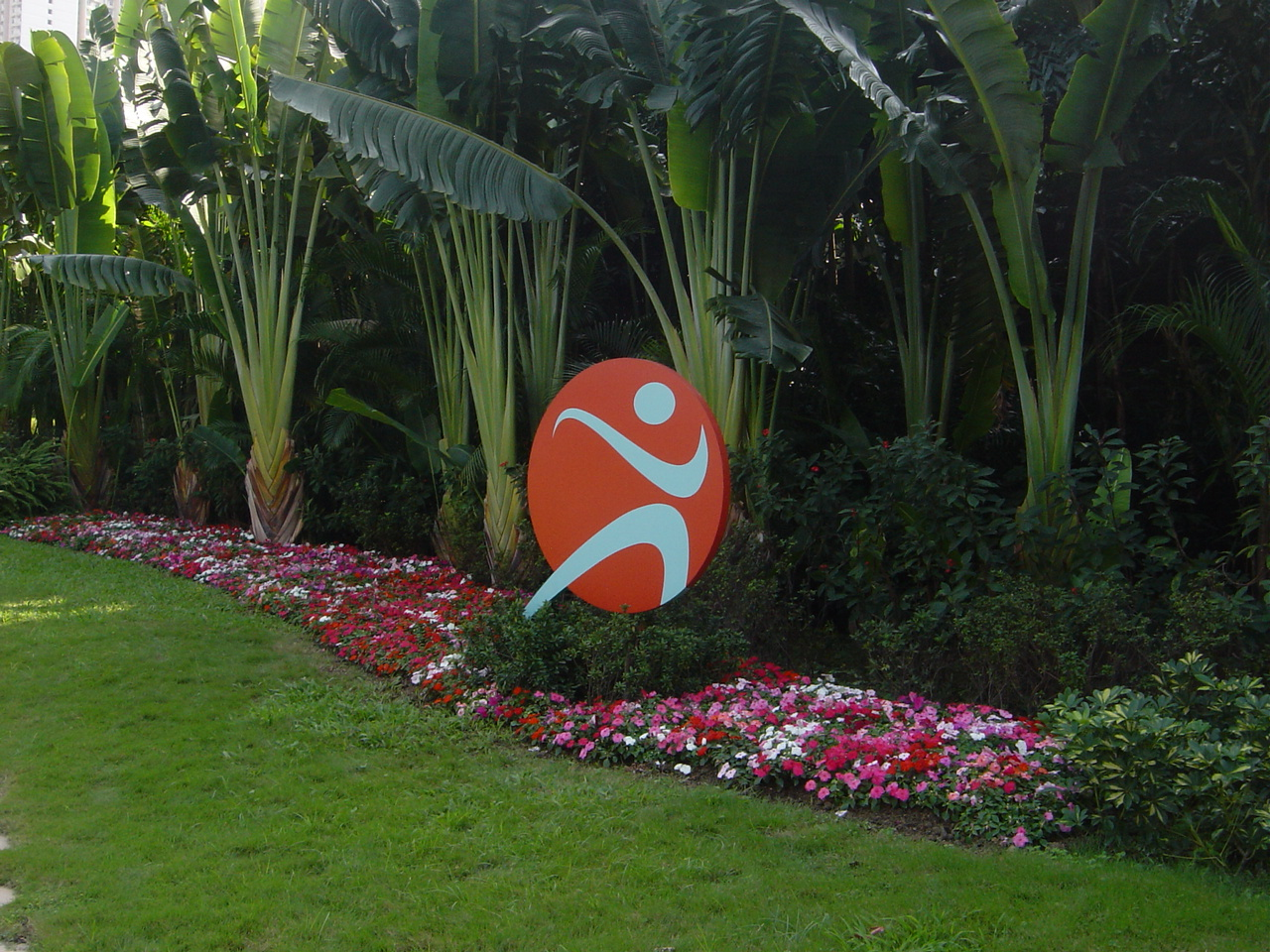
Princess Margaret Road garden

The LCSD maintains and operates 26 major parks and 680 children’s playgrounds.

=== Beaches ===
Among Hong Kong's many hundreds of beaches, there are 42 gazetted beaches, which are provisioned and managed by LCSD. Services usually include toilets and showers, shark nets (although actual shark sightings are rare), a lifeguard service, regular cleaning, and water quality monitoring.

=== Sports and fitness ===
The LCSD operates two stadiums, (Hong Kong Stadium and Mong Kok Stadium), along with 25 sports grounds, 105 sport centers, and 45 public swimming pools.

== Sports Subvention Scheme ==
Under the Sports Subvention Scheme, the LCSD provides recurrent subvention to 62 national sports associations (NSAs) in Hong Kong, at levels ranging from around HK$0.5 million to HK$10 million (in 2011–12). Until 2004–2005, NSAs received subventions from the statutory Hong Kong Sports Development Board. NSAs are members of the Sports Federation and Olympic Committee of Hong Kong, China, which is the National Olympic Committee in Hong Kong responsible for the co-ordination of all local sports organisations and the promotion of sports in Hong Kong.

== National security ==
In August 2023, it said that the next operator of the Avenue of Stars would have to comply with national security concerns.

== See also ==
- Hong Kong cultural policy
- The former Urban Council and Urban Services Department
- The former Regional Council and Regional Services Department
