= Alexander Grantham (fireboat) =

Coordinates: 22°17′21.30″N 114°13′9.35″E

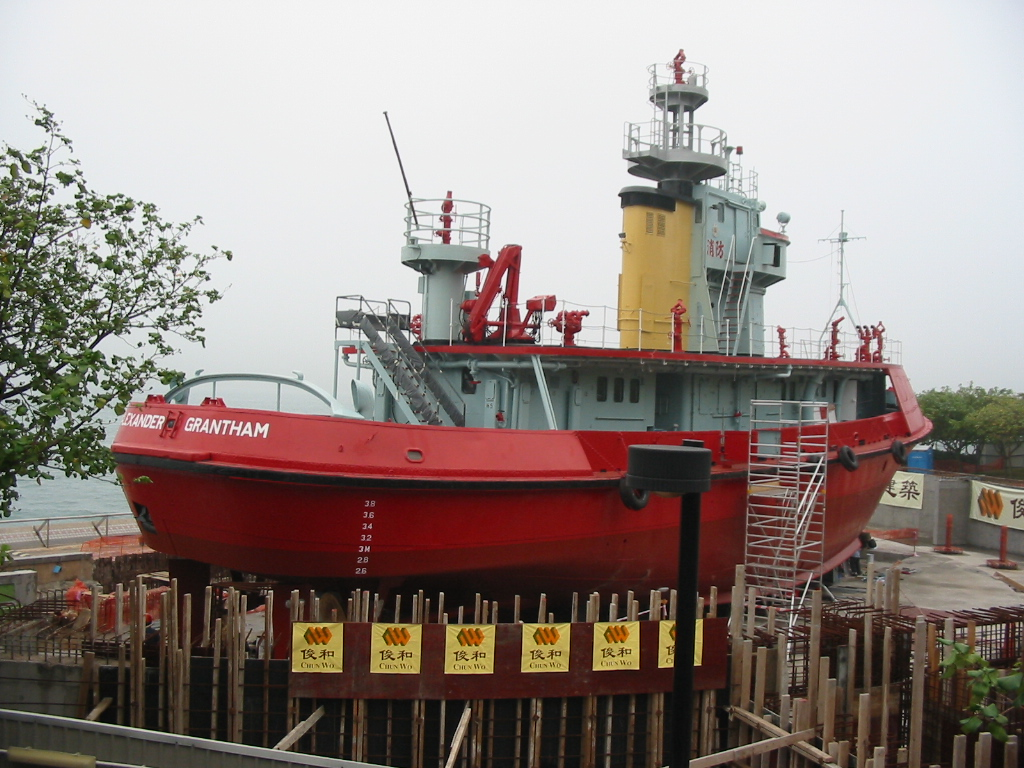

History

Hong Kong (Fire Services Department)
- Name: Alexander Grantham
- Namesake: Alexander Grantham
- Owner: Hong Kong Museum of History
- Builder: Hong Kong and Whampoa Dock
- Launched: 22 December 1952; 73 years ago
- In service: 1953; 73 years ago
- Out of service: May 2002; 24 years ago
- Status: Museum ship

General characteristics
- Type: Fireboat
- Displacement: 511 tons
- Length: 38.9 m (128 ft)
- Beam: 8.8 m (29 ft)
- Height: 15 m (49 ft)
- Speed: 12.5 knots

Alexander Grantham
- Traditional Chinese: 葛量洪號
Transcriptions
Yue: Cantonese
- Yale Romanization: Got lèuhng hùhng houh
- Jyutping: Got3 loeng4 hung4 hou6

Alexander Grantham is a fireboat formerly operated by the Fire Services Department of Hong Kong. It was named after Governor of Hong Kong, Sir Alexander Grantham. The boat has since retired from service and been replaced by other vessels.

On 10 March 2006, the fireboat was successfully hoisted into its new permanent home in the Central Concourse of Quarry Bay Park, where it has been converted into the Fireboat Alexander Grantham Exhibition Gallery and was opened to the public as a museum in 2007, managed by Leisure and Cultural Services Department. In addition to the fireboat itself, the gallery houses a number of multimedia exhibits on the vessel's history and on firefighting in Hong Kong.

3D laser scanning technology in digital recording of structures was applied to capture the 3D images of the structure.

== Public display ==
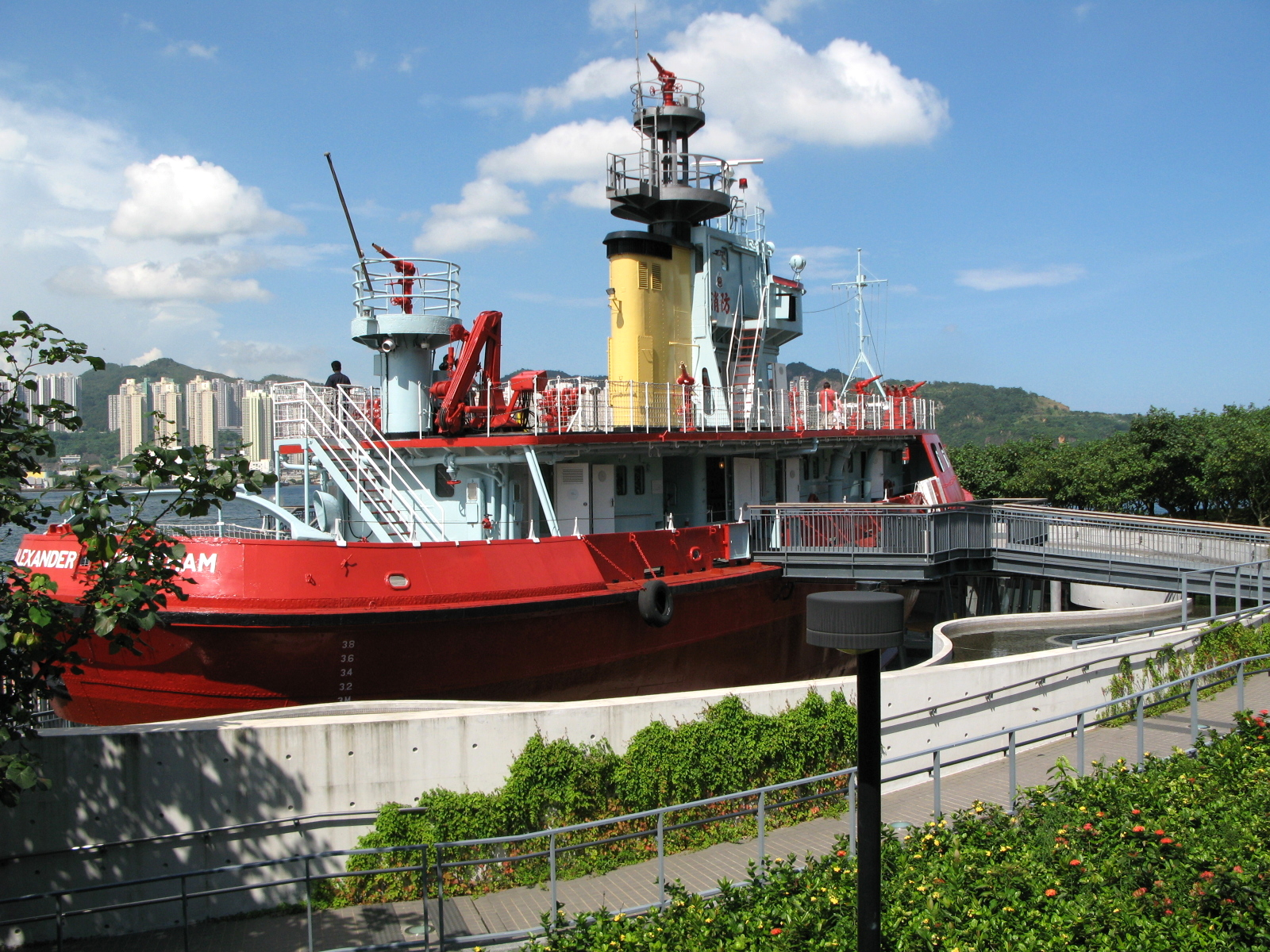
Fireboat Alexander Grantham at Quarry Bay Park.

The lifting of the 500-tonne historic boat onto land is the first project of its kind ever conducted in Asia. Alexander Grantham is also the first boat preserved as a historic relic in Hong Kong, and is the Hong Kong Museum of History's largest "Made in Hong Kong" collection item.

The landing of Alexander Grantham marks the end of 50 years of her service in Victoria Harbour, though the vessel remains on the waterfront in its new role. Construction of the exhibition gallery was performed with assistance from the Architectural Services Department and the Leisure and Cultural Services Department.

== Showcase of Hong Kong's sea salvage history ==
Alexander Grantham, the largest in the fleet of fireboats, was built by the Hong Kong Whampoa Dock Company Limited in 1953 and decommissioned in May 2002, after 49 years of service.

Measuring 38.9 metres long, 8.8 metres wide, 15 metres tall and with a loaded displacement of 511 tonnes, it has taken part in numerous fire-fighting and rescue operations, including the Seawise University fire in 1972, the Eastern Gate fire in the 1980s and the New Orient Princess fire in 1993.

Alexander Grantham is also a perceptive example of the Hong Kong shipbuilding industry's accomplishments in the early 1950s. It showcases Hong Kong's sea salvage history of the past century and provides a glimpse of the territory's social development.

== Transport ==
The fireboat is accessible within walking distance northeast from Tai Koo station of the MTR.
