= Hong Kong Economic and Trade Office in Guangdong =

Political representative office in Guangzhou, Guangdong

- 香港特別行政區政府駐粵經濟貿易辦事處
- Emblem of Hong Kong

Agency overview
- Formed: July 2002
- Jurisdiction: Government of Hong Kong
- Headquarters: Room 7101, 71F, CITIC Plaza, 233 Tianhe North Road, Tianhe, Guangzhou, Guangdong
- Agency executive: Linda So Wai-sze, Director
- Parent department: Administration Wing
- Parent agency: Constitutional and Mainland Affairs Bureau
- Website: www.gdeto.gov.hk/en/index.html

The Hong Kong Economic and Trade Office in Guangdong is the representative office of the Government of Hong Kong in Guangzhou, Guangdong.

== History ==
The department was established in July 2002 and is the first of the four economic and trade offices in mainland China. The Hong Kong Economic and Trade Office in Guangdong established the Liaison Office in Shenzhen in August 2010 to provide assistance to Hong Kong businessmen and people in Shenzhen and to strengthen ties with the Shenzhen Municipal Government, non-governmental organizations and chambers of commerce to enhance cooperation between Hong Kong, Guangdong and Shenzhen. The Hong Kong Economic and Trade Office in Guangdong established the Liaison Office in Fujian in Fuzhou on February 27, 2012, to seize the development opportunities of the West Coast Economic Zone and deepen the multi-faceted cooperation between Hong Kong and Fujian Province. The Hong Kong Economic and Trade Office in Guangdong established the Liaison Office in Guangxi in Nanning on April 18, 2017, to deepen the multi-faceted cooperation between Hong Kong and the Guangxi Zhuang Autonomous Region.

== Main functions ==
Hong Kong Economic and Trade Offices and Liaison Offices in the Mainland. The green area is the service area of the Hong Kong Economic and Trade Office in Guangdong.

The main function of the Guangdong Economic and Trade Office is to promote economic and trade ties and strengthen cooperation between the five provinces and autonomous regions of Fujian, Jiangxi, Guangdong, Guangxi Zhuang Autonomous Region and Hainan and the Hong Kong Special Administrative Region. The Guangdong Economic and Trade Office also set up an Immigration Division to provide emergency support services to Hong Kong residents in the five provinces and autonomous regions.

In 2014, with the Economic and Trade Office in Wuhan coming into use, Jiangxi Province was no longer served by the Economic and Trade Office in Guangdong.

== List of directors ==
1. Liang Bairen (April 1, 2001 - December 31, 2008)
2. Zheng Weiyuan (January 5, 2009 - July 10, 2011)
3. Zhu Jingwen (July 11, 2011 - May 25, 2014)
4. Tang Ka Hei (May 26, 2014 - March 31, 2019)
5. Chen Xuanyao (April 1, 2019 - December 5, 2022)
6. Su Huisi (December 6, 2022 to present)

== See also ==
- Hong Kong Economic and Trade Office
- Foreign relations of Hong Kong
- One country, two systems
