= Hong Kong Economic and Trade Office in Wuhan =

Political representative office in Wuhan, China

- 香港特別行政區政府駐武漢經濟貿易辦事處
- Emblem of Hong Kong

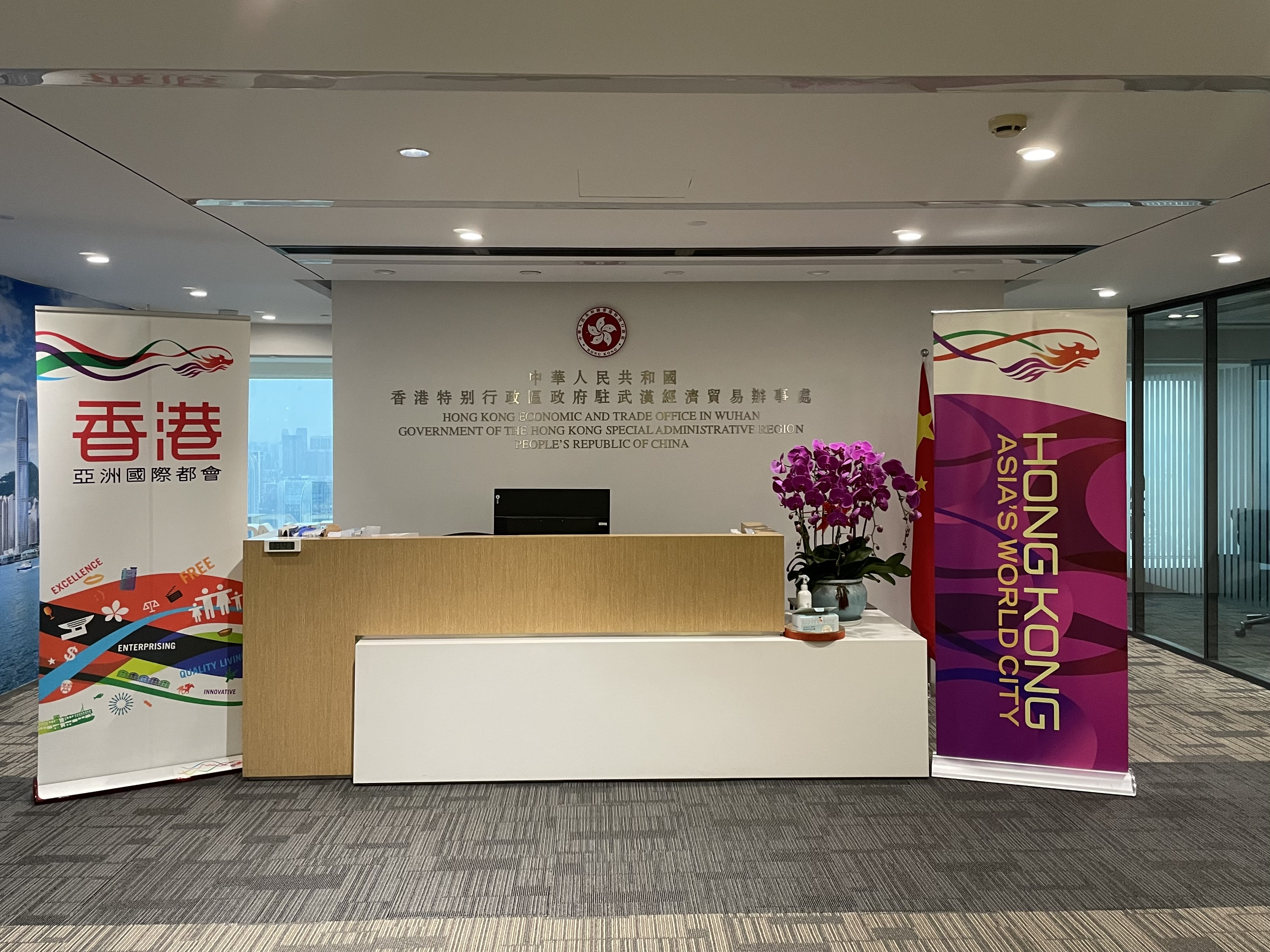
- The Wuhan Office in 2023

Agency overview
- Formed: April 1, 2014
- Jurisdiction: Government of Hong Kong
- Headquarters: Room 4303, Building I, New World International Trade Tower, No. 568, Jianshe Avenue, Jianghan, Wuhan, Hubei
- Agency executive: Alice Choi Man Kwan, Director
- Parent department: Administration Wing
- Parent agency: Constitutional and Mainland Affairs Bureau
- Website: www.wheto.gov.hk/tc/index.html

The Hong Kong Economic and Trade Office in Wuhan is the representative office of the Government of Hong Kong in Wuhan, Hubei.

== History ==
It came into operation on 1 April 2014. When the Hong Kong Office in Hankou was first established, its temporary office was located on the 18th floor of Block A, Poly Plaza, Wuhan and later moved to its permanent office address, the New World Trade Center, Hankou.

== Main functions ==
The main functions of the Wuhan Office include: further strengthening the ties and communications between the HKSAR Government and the five provinces of Hubei, Hunan, Shanxi, Jiangxi and Henan; promoting exchanges and cooperation between the relevant provinces and Hong Kong in economic, trade and other fields; supporting Hong Kong people and businesses in the relevant provinces; deepening Mainland people's understanding of Hong Kong; and providing practical assistance to Hong Kong residents who encounter difficulties in the five central provinces. The Wuhan Office has five sections, namely: the Liaison Coordination Section, the Economic and Trade Relations Section, the Investment Promotion Section, the Administration and Public Relations Section and the Immigration Section. It also has a Liaison Office in Hunan and a Liaison Office in Henan.

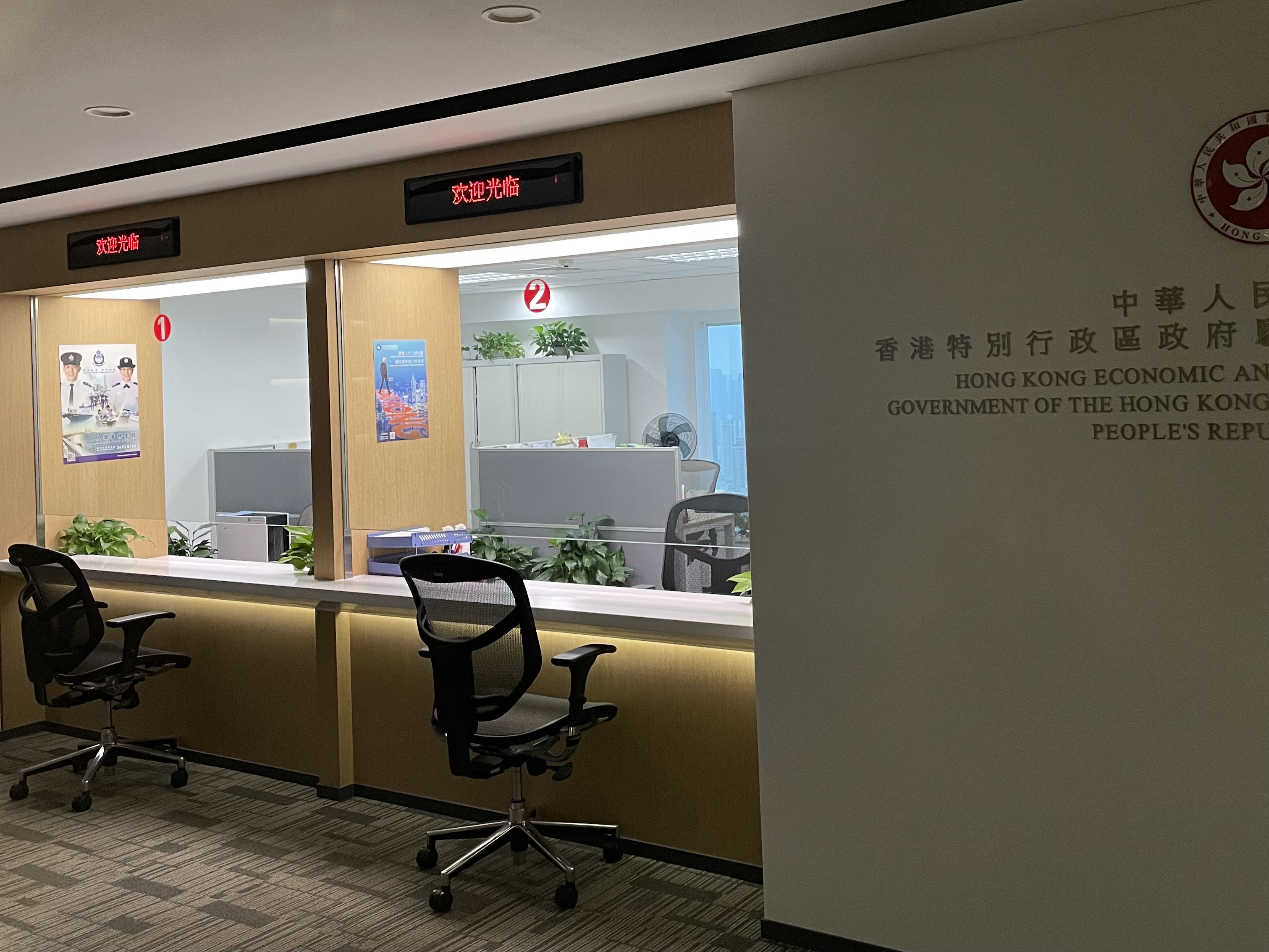
Hong Kong Economic and Trade Office in Wuhan Immigration Division

Hong Kong Economic and Trade Offices and Liaison Offices in the Mainland. The purple area is the service area of the Hong Kong Economic and Trade Office in Wuhan.

== List of directors ==
1. Xie Qiwen (February 18, 2014 - September 10, 2017)
2. Fung Ho Yin (September 11, 2017 - September 30, 2020)
3. Guo Weixun (October 1, 2020 to December 1, 2024)
4. Cai Minjun (from January 26, 2025)

== See also ==
- Hong Kong Economic and Trade Office
- Foreign relations of Hong Kong
- One country, two systems
