= 2017 Milin earthquake =

Earthquake in Tibet, China

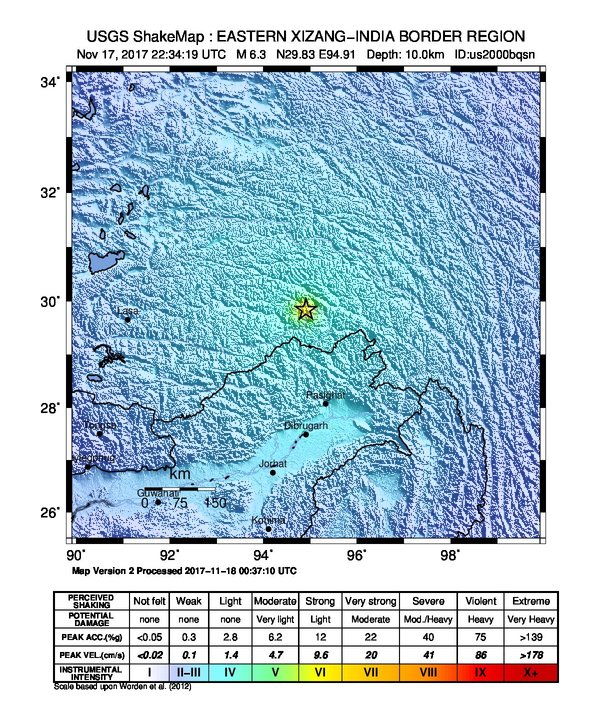
- ShakeMap generated by the United States Geological Survey, with the epicenter marked by a star.

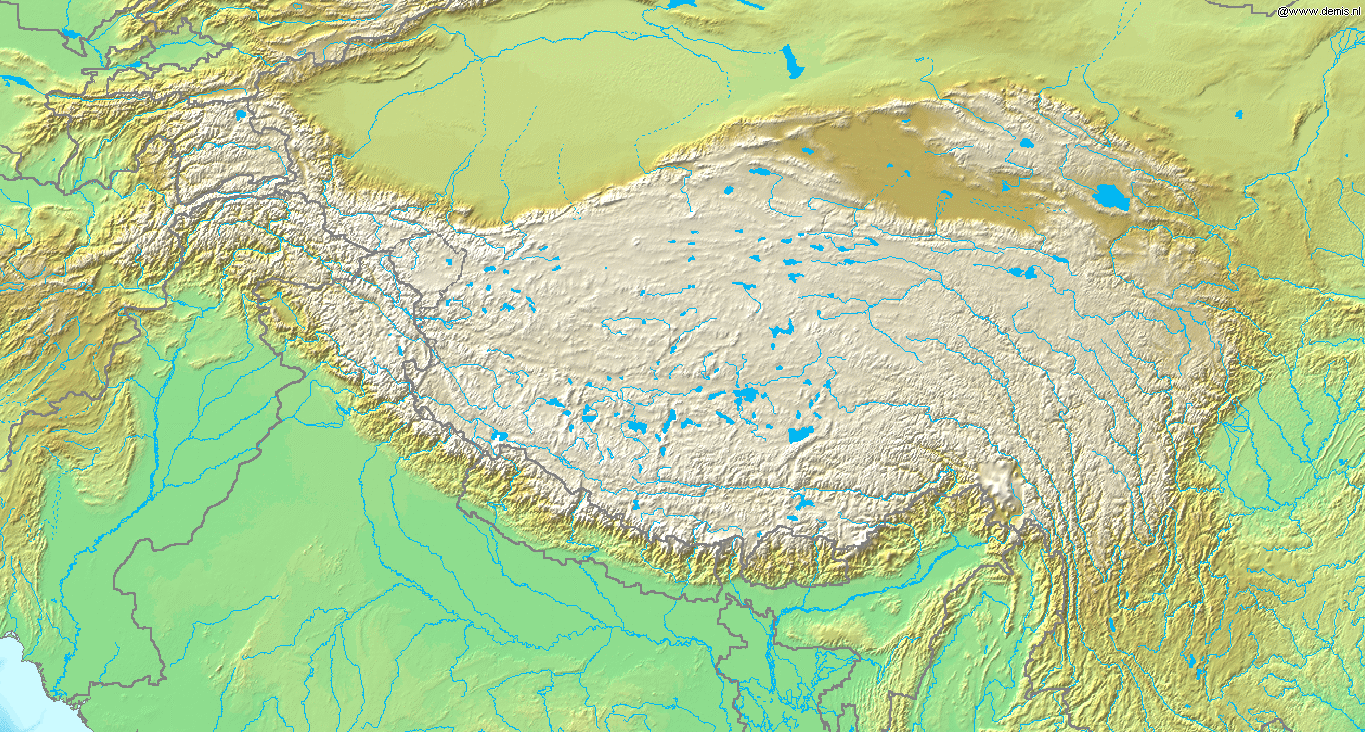
- Location within Tibetan Plateau
- UTC time: 2017-11-17 22:34:19 2017-11-18 06:34:24 2017-11-18 06:34:19 Needs 'yyyy-mm-dd hh:mm'
- ISC event
- USGS-ANSS
- Local date
- Local time
- Magnitude: M_{s} 6.9 (CENC) M_{w} 6.5 (CENC) M_{w} 6.4 (USGS)
- Depth: 8 km (5.0 mi) (USGS) 10 km (6.2 mi) (CENC) 12 km (7.5 mi) (EMSC)
- Epicenter: 29.75°N 95.02°E
- Areas affected: China Nyingchi, Tibet Autonomous Region
- Max. intensity: VIII (CENC); VII (USGS)
- Tsunami: None
- Aftershocks: 1,416 (as of 21 November 2017); Largest aftershock: M_{s} 5.0 (CENC)
- Casualties: 3 injured

2017 Milin earthquake occurred on 18 November 2017 in Milin County, Nyingchi Prefecture, Tibet Autonomous Region, China. The epicenter was located at 29.75°N, 95.02°E. The earthquake had a magnitude of M_{S} 6.9 and a focal depth of approximately 10 km.

The China Earthquake Administration stated that the earthquake was primarily of a thrust fault type. The epicenter was located along the northeastern extension of the Dawugou fault within the East Himalayan Syntaxis of the Yarlung Zangbo fault zone. Strong shaking was reported in parts of Tibet. The epicenter was approximately 56 km from Motuo County, 65 km from Bayi District, Nyingchi, 73 km from Bomi County, 98 km from Milin County, 135 km from Luolong County, and 378 km from Lhasa. Following the mainshock, numerous aftershocks occurred in the surrounding area. Although the epicenter was located in a sparsely populated uninhabited region, the earthquake still injured three people, temporarily disrupted the Sichuan–Tibet Highway, and caused varying degrees of damage to buildings near the epicenter. The China Earthquake Administration classified the event as a significant earthquake disaster and activated a Level III emergency response.

== Geological setting ==
The Himalayas are one of the most seismically active regions in the world. The mountain range is situated within the Alpide belt and is affected by the ongoing convergence between the Eurasian Plate and the Indian Plate. The Indian Plate is moving northward at a rate of approximately 50 mm per year and colliding with the Eurasian Plate along the Himalayan arc, resulting in the continued uplift of the Tibetan Plateau. According to the China Earthquake Administration, three major fault zones, including the Jiali Fault and the Milin Fault, are located near the epicenter of the earthquake. The agency further suggested that the causative fault may have been the north-northwest-trending Damu–Bianba Fault, a zone characterized by frequent small earthquakes and a northwestern-trending fault at the northern apex of the Eastern Himalayan Syntaxis. Some researchers have argued from a geodynamic perspective that the earthquake was triggered by the continued northward push of the Indian Plate, which further drove the Myanmar Arc into the interior of mainland China and ultimately resulted in the event.

The epicenter of the earthquake was located near the tectonic boundary of the southern Tibetan Plateau. The Yarlung Tsangpo Fault Zone in this region is the result of the tectonic evolution associated with the subduction and collision of the Indian Plate beneath the Eurasian continent. This geological setting has resulted in frequent seismic activity along the fault zone. In addition to this earthquake, several major historical earthquakes have occurred in the region, including the 1897 Assam earthquake, the 1950 Assam–Tibet earthquake, and the April 2015 Nepal earthquake. According to an analysis by the China Earthquake Administration, the Milin seismic zone is located in an area experiencing some of the largest variations in crustal movement rates. The 2015 Nepal earthquake increased Coulomb stress in nearby regions, while time-series observations indicated an accelerating compressional trend, both of which may have increased the likelihood of earthquake occurrence.

== Damage and casualties ==
The earthquake occurred at 22:34 UTC on 17 November 2017 (06:34 local time on 18 November). The epicenter was located in the mountainous region of eastern Tibet, a sparsely populated area with a population of approximately 23,000 people. Much of the surrounding region consists of uninhabited land with harsh geological conditions. The earthquake struck during the early morning hours. A local shopkeeper reported that the shaking was "very strong". Basang Ciren, the Communist Party secretary of Zhaxigang Village in Lulang Town, Milin County, stated that the shaking was so intense that it was difficult to remain standing indoors and that it was the strongest earthquake he had ever experienced. A resident living near the epicenter said that he was awakened by the shaking and immediately ran outside, although no injuries occurred in his area. A tourist described feeling the building sway noticeably while hearing a loud rumbling noise outside, with the shaking lasting for more than ten seconds. According to reports, the earthquake was clearly felt throughout Nyingchi, while the strongest shaking was experienced in Milin County and areas near the epicenter.

The earthquake caused roof collapses on some buildings in Lulang Town of Bayi District, Nyingchi. Houses in Zhaxigang Village and Luobu Village were cracked, while some residential buildings sustained structural damage. Power was completely cut off in Layue Village. According to official statistics, the earthquake and its aftershocks damaged 2,992 households. Of these, 1,003 were located in Milin County and 226 in Bayi District. A total of 24 office buildings, seven police stations, nine health clinics, and 25 schools were damaged by the earthquake. Numerous roads were blocked by landslides triggered by the earthquake, with 162 road disruptions reported at various levels of the transportation network. The Sichuan–Tibet Highway was blocked by large boulders as a result of landslides. Construction on the Sichuan–Tibet railway between Lhasa and Nyingchi was suspended for half a day to allow for a comprehensive safety inspection. Seven telecommunications base stations and 53 communication lines near the epicenter were damaged. Communications were disrupted in some areas, affecting approximately 200 households. As of 12:00 on 18 November, three people had sustained minor injuries. In total, 12,309 people were affected by the earthquake, and approximately 2,000 residents required emergency relocation and temporary shelter.

== Observations and studies ==
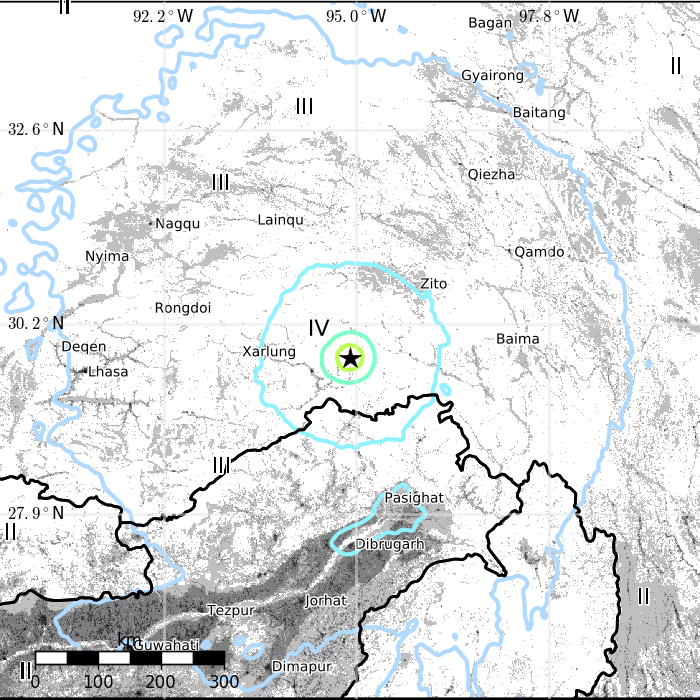
Isoseismal map of the 2017 Milin earthquake published by the United States Geological Survey.

The China Earthquake Networks Center (CENC) determined that the earthquake had a surface-wave magnitude of 6.9 and a moment magnitude of 6.5, with a focal depth of 10 km. Using an empirical intensity attenuation model, CENC estimated the maximum intensity of the earthquake to be VIII on the China seismic intensity scale. The United States Geological Survey (USGS) initially reported the earthquake as having a moment magnitude of 6.3 and a focal depth of 10 km. It also estimated a maximum intensity of VII on the Modified Mercalli intensity scale, with a peak ground acceleration of 23.84% g. The USGS later revised the magnitude to 6.4 and the focal depth to 8 km. According to the European-Mediterranean Seismological Centre (EMSC), the earthquake had a moment magnitude of 6.4 and a focal depth of 12 km. The maximum intensity near the epicenter was estimated at V on the European Macroseismic Scale. The GFZ German Research Centre for Geosciences estimated the earthquake to have a moment magnitude of 6.4 and a focal depth of 13 km. The Geophysical Survey of the Russian Academy of Sciences recorded the earthquake at 58 seismic stations. According to its analysis, the event had a surface-wave magnitude of 6.6, a body-wave magnitude of 6.2, and a focal depth of 10 km. The maximum intensity was estimated to have reached at least IX on the Medvedev–Sponheuer–Karnik scale.

Macroseismic intensity assessments conducted by the China Earthquake Administration confirmed a maximum intensity of VIII on the China seismic intensity scale. The isoseismal pattern was generally elongated in a northwesterly direction. The area affected by intensity VI or greater covered approximately 12,870 km², while the area of the intensity VIII zone covered about 310 km². Following consultations with experts, the China Earthquake Administration concluded that the magnitude 6.9 Milin earthquake was the mainshock and that a larger earthquake was not expected to occur in the region afterward. The Did You Feel It? survey conducted by the United States Geological Survey received public reports indicating shaking intensities of up to IX on the Modified Mercalli intensity scale.

Frequent aftershocks followed the mainshock. As of 08:00 on 21 November 2017, the China Earthquake Networks Center had recorded a total of 1,416 aftershocks. These included one earthquake of magnitude 5.0–5.9, two earthquakes of magnitude 4.0–4.9, and four earthquakes of magnitude 3.0–3.9.

== Response and relief efforts ==
Following the earthquake, a People's Liberation Army border defense unit stationed in Milin dispatched an emergency advance team of nearly 200 personnel to the epicentral area for rescue and reconnaissance operations. The team arrived at Suosong Village in Pai Town, Milin County, at 08:45 local time. The Milin County detachment of the People's Armed Police in Nyingchi also deployed personnel equipped with rescue supplies and specialized equipment to the affected area. The Nyingchi Fire Brigade rapidly dispatched rescue personnel carrying emergency equipment by helicopter and fire engines to the disaster zone. Its Second Detachment reopened damaged sections of the Sichuan–Tibet Highway and cleared landslide debris and fallen rocks from the roadway. The People's Liberation Army Nyingchi Military Subdistrict deployed 234 soldiers and 538 militia personnel to conduct rescue operations, assess damage, and assist in the evacuation and relocation of affected residents. The People's Liberation Army Air Force dispatched personnel to heavily affected areas and deployed unmanned aerial vehicles to conduct aerial surveys of the disaster zone. Air transport units of the PLAAF were placed on standby for possible deployment. The 77th Group Army and the People's Armed Police Hydropower Corps prepared reconnaissance, communications, and other support units for possible deployment. The China Centre for Resources Satellite Data and Application urgently tasked multiple satellites to observe the affected area, including the Gaofen-4 satellite, which obtained imagery of the disaster zone. Meanwhile, local civil affairs authorities established 49 temporary shelters to accommodate displaced residents.

Major airports in Tibet remained operational following the earthquake. At Nyingchi Mainling Airport, arriving and departing flights resumed normal operations after safety inspections confirmed that no hazards were present. The Yarlung Tsangpo Grand Canyon scenic area in Nyingchi was temporarily closed following the earthquake. Several travel agencies canceled tours to the affected region and issued refunds to impacted travelers.

The National Commission for Disaster Reduction and the Ministry of Civil Affairs of the People's Republic of China activated a national Level IV disaster relief emergency response at 10:30 on 18 November and dispatched a working group to the affected area to coordinate disaster relief efforts. The People's Government of Tibet Autonomous Region also activated a Level III earthquake emergency response. The People's Armed Police Tibet Autonomous Region Corps activated its emergency response mechanism and began collecting information on the disaster. Units were instructed to closely monitor developments and promptly report damage assessments. The PAP detachments in Nyingchi, Qamdo, and Shannan, as well as engineering units of the First and Second Detachments, were ordered to prepare for rescue operations in the earthquake-stricken area. Following the earthquake, the China Earthquake Administration established an emergency command headquarters for the Milin earthquake to coordinate response efforts and manage seismic information. The China Earthquake Networks Center, the Yunnan Earthquake Agency, and the Sichuan Earthquake Agency also organized experts to assist Tibet in assessing seismic trends and aftershock activity. Experts from the Institute of Earthquake Forecasting and the Institute of Geophysics, China Earthquake Administration were sent to the affected area to support emergency response efforts. A field command headquarters was established in Nyingchi to conduct investigations and damage assessments in the earthquake zone. Subsequently, the Institute of Tibetan Plateau Research of the Chinese Academy of Sciences confirmed that water-level changes had occurred in the core area of the Yarlung Tsangpo Grand Canyon as a result of the earthquake, although no ice avalanches or snow avalanches were reported.

Following the earthquake, Chinese Premier Li Keqiang and Vice Premier Wang Yang issued directives calling for enhanced aftershock monitoring, assessment of seismic trends, prevention of secondary disasters such as earthquake-induced geological hazards, public opinion analysis, information management, and full support for local earthquake relief efforts. Yang Chuantang, Party Secretary of the Ministry of Transport of the People's Republic of China, and Minister Li Xiaopeng also issued instructions requiring the ministry's Highway Bureau and Road Network Center to activate emergency response procedures and implement disaster-response measures in accordance with contingency plans. Jiang Daming, Minister of the Ministry of Land and Resources of the People's Republic of China, and Party Secretary Sun Shaocheng instructed officials to immediately coordinate with the Department of Land and Resources of Tibet Autonomous Region, assess the disaster situation, and take measures to address secondary geological hazards triggered by the earthquake. The ministry also activated a Level IV emergency response for geological disasters.

The Immigration Department (Hong Kong) stated that following the earthquake it had contacted the Hong Kong Economic and Trade Office in Chengdu and the Travel Industry Council of Hong Kong to assess the situation. No requests for assistance from Hong Kong residents had been received at the time of the announcement.

== See also ==
- List of earthquakes in China
