= Janice Tse =

Hong Kong civil servant (born 1965)

The Honourable Janice Tse Siu-wa GBS, JP
- 謝小華
- Tse in 2026

Secretary for Constitutional and Mainland Affairs
- Incumbent
- Assumed office 30 March 2026
- Chief Executive: John Lee
- Preceded by: Erick Tsang

Permanent Secretary for the Environment and Ecology
- In office 17 January 2022 – 1 January 2025
- Preceded by: Maisie Cheng Mei-sze
- Succeeded by: Eddie Cheung Kwok-choi

Director of Enviromental Protection
- In office 17 January 2022 – 31 December 2022
- Preceded by: Maisie Cheng Mei-sze
- Succeeded by: Samuel Chui Ho Kwong

Personal details
- Born: Tse Siu-wa; January 2, 1965 (age 61) British Hong Kong

Janice Tse Siu-wa, GBS, JP (Chinese: 謝小華, born 2 January 1965) is a Hong Kong civil servant who is the current Secretary for Constitutional and Mainland Affairs since 30 March 2026, succeeding Erick Tsang, who resigned due to health issues. She previously served as the Permanent Secretary for the Environment and Ecology and Director of Environmental Protection.

== Early life and education ==
Janice Tse Siu-wa was born on 2 January 1965 in British Hong Kong. She graduated from the University of Hong Kong with a Bachelor of Economics and graduated from a Bachelor of Law from the University of London.

== Civil Service ==
=== Early service ===
In June 1987, Tse joined the Hong Kong Government as a administrative officer as part of the Hong Kong Island branch Leisure and Cultural Services Department. In October of the same year, she was transferred to the Labour Department as an Assistant Labour Affairs Officer. In 1989, she was transferred to the Constitutional Affairs Bureau as an Assistant Constitutional Affairs Secretary.

In May 1994, she was appointed as Assistant Secretary for Economic Affairs. After the Handover of Hong Kong, she was sent to serve as the Deputy Representative of the Hong Kong Government to the European Union.

=== Chief Administrative Officer ===
After Tse became a Chief Administrative Officer in April 1999, she continued to serve at Hong Kong Economic and Trade Office in Brussels and in February 2000 assisted in coordinating the overseas visits of Hong Kong Legislative Council members to Europe. She continued to serve as Principal Assistant Secretary for the Treasury when the Treasury was reorganized into the Financial Services and the Treasury Bureau in 2002. She was transferred to the Economic Development and Labour Bureau in 2005 and was appointed as Deputy Secretary,

In September 2009, the Hong Kong government appointed Tse to serve as the Director of the Electronic Health Records Coordination Office of the Food and Health Bureau. The position was set up to coordinate electronic health record schemes, including the medical record exchange system. Tse also served as the chairperson of the Working Group on Legal, Privacy and Security Issues during the system development process.

=== Director of Home Affairs ===
Tse was appointed Director of Home Affairs on 11 April 2016. Following the landslide victory of the Pan-Democracy camp in the 2019 District Council elections, she suspended numerous District Council meetings and secretarial services due to the COVID-19 pandemic, causing her to be severely criticized by the Pan-Democrats. In addition, Tse's reduction of funding to district councils starting in 2020 sparked budget disputes, and the district councils retaliated by reducing the expenditure of the Home Affairs Department.

She left office as Director of Home Affairs in January 2022 after she was appointed as Permanent Secretary for Environment and Ecology.

=== Environment Bureau ===
On 17 January 2022, she was appointed Director of the Environmental Protection Department and Permanent Secretary for Environment and Ecology. Tse was responsible for overseeing the policies of the Hong Kong Observatory and the Agriculture, Fisheries and Conservation Department. Due to her increased workload as both Director of Environmental protection adn Permanent Secretary for Environment, she stepped down from the former on 31 December 2022. After stepping down as Director, Tse continued to actively visit subordinate departments to understand their daily work and accompanied Secretary for Environment and Ecology Tse Chin-wan on a visit to Beijing to coordinate with the Ministry of Ecology and Environment in Mainland China in 2023. She organized 2024 National Ecology Day events in Hong Kong represented the Hong Kong government in international forums. She retired from the civil service on 2 January 2025 after she turned 60. She was awarded the Golden Bauhinia Star on 1 July the same year for her service.

=== Secretary for Constitutional and Mainland Affairs ===
On 30 March 2026, following the resignation of Erick Tsang in January, she became the new Secretary for Constitutional and Mainland Affairs. Upon taking office, Chief Executive John Lee specifically entrusted Tse with the responsibility of coordinating and forming the first Five-Year Plan for Hong Kong and also to coordinate with Mainland China's 15th Five-Year Plan.
