= Hong Kong Economic and Trade Office in Chengdu =

Political representative office in Chengdu, China

- 香港特別行政區政府駐成都經濟貿易辦事處
- Emblem of Hong Kong

Agency overview
- Formed: September 28, 2006
- Jurisdiction: Government of Hong Kong
- Headquarters: Building 2, International Financial Center, No. 1, Section 3, Hongxing Road, Jinjiang, Chengdu, Sichuan
- Agency executive: Enoch Yuen Ka-lok, Director
- Parent department: Administration Wing
- Parent agency: Constitutional and Mainland Affairs Bureau
- Website: www.cdeto.gov.hk

The Hong Kong Economic and Trade Office in Chengdu is the representative office of the Government of Hong Kong in Chengdu, Sichuan.

== History ==
With the approval of the State Council, the Chengdu Office was formally established on September 28, 2006. On January 15, 2012, the Chongqing Liaison Office was established in Chongqing, responsible for promoting bilateral economic and trade relations between Hong Kong and Chongqing. On April 17, 2017, the Shaanxi Liaison Office was established in Xi'an, responsible for promoting bilateral economic and trade relations between Hong Kong and Shaanxi.

== Main functions ==
Hong Kong Economic and Trade Offices and Liaison Offices in the Mainland. The blue area is the service area of the Hong Kong Economic and Trade Office in Chengdu.

The main function of the Chengdu Economic and Trade Office is to promote economic and trade ties and strengthen cooperation between the seven provinces, municipalities and autonomous regions of Sichuan, Guizhou, Yunnan, Qinghai, Shaanxi, Tibet and Chongqing and the Hong Kong Special Administrative Region.

== List of directors ==
1. Pan Taiping (October 12, 2009 - January 25, 2013)
2. Liu Jinquan (January 28, 2013 - November 2, 2016)
3. Lin Yawen (November 3, 2016 - June 2018)
4. Li Yunyan (December 3, 2018 - May 19, 2023)
5. Yuan Jianuo (May 22, 2023 to present)

== See also ==
- Hong Kong Economic and Trade Office
- Foreign relations of Hong Kong
- One country, two systems
