= Hong Kong Office in Beijing =

Political representative office in Xicheng, Beijing, China

Coordinates: 39°55′56″N 116°22′57″E

Office of the Government of the Hong Kong Special Administrative Region of the People's Republic of China in Beijing
- 中華人民共和國 香港特別行政區政府 駐北京辦事處
- Emblem of Hong Kong

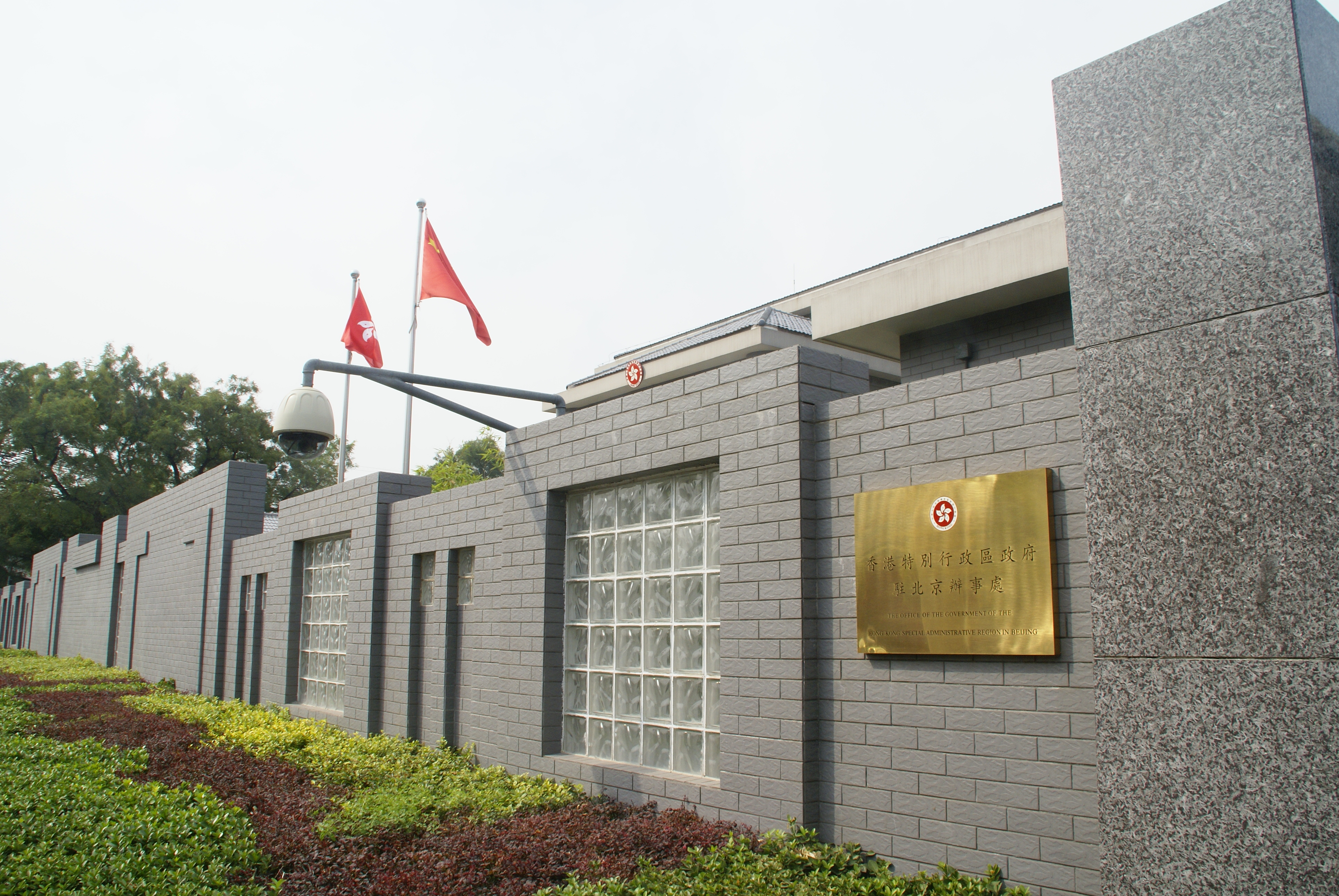
- Office in 2007

Agency overview
- Formed: 4 March 1999
- Jurisdiction: Government of Hong Kong
- Headquarters: Xicheng, Beijing
- Agency executive: John Leung, Director
- Parent department: Administration Wing
- Parent agency: Constitutional and Mainland Affairs Bureau
- Website: bjo.gov.hk

The Office of the Government of the Hong Kong Special Administrative Region of the People's Republic of China in Beijing is the representative office of the Government of Hong Kong in the national capital Beijing.

Its counterpart office is the Liaison Office of the Central People's Government in the Hong Kong Special Administrative Region, representative office of the Central Government of the People's Republic of China in Hong Kong.

== Main functions ==
Hong Kong Economic and Trade Offices and Liaison Offices in the Mainland. The orange area is the service area of the Hong Kong Office in Beijing.

- Further enhancing the Hong Kong SAR Government's liaison and communication with the Central People's Government of the People's Republic of China
- Facilitating exchange and co-operation in business and other aspects between Hong Kong and mainland China
- Promoting Hong Kong to mainland China residents
- Processing applications for entry to Hong Kong
- Providing practical assistance to Hong Kong residents in distress in mainland China

== Transport ==
The office is accessible within walking distance East from Beihaibei station on the Line 6 of the Beijing Subway.

== See also ==
- Liaison Office of the Central People's Government in the Hong Kong Special Administrative Region
- Hong Kong Economic and Trade Office
- Foreign relations of Hong Kong
- Office of the Macau Special Administrative Region in Beijing
- One country, two systems
