= Hong Kong Economic and Trade Office in Shanghai =

Political representative office in Shanghai, China

- 香港特別行政區政府駐上海經濟貿易辦事處
- Emblem of Hong Kong

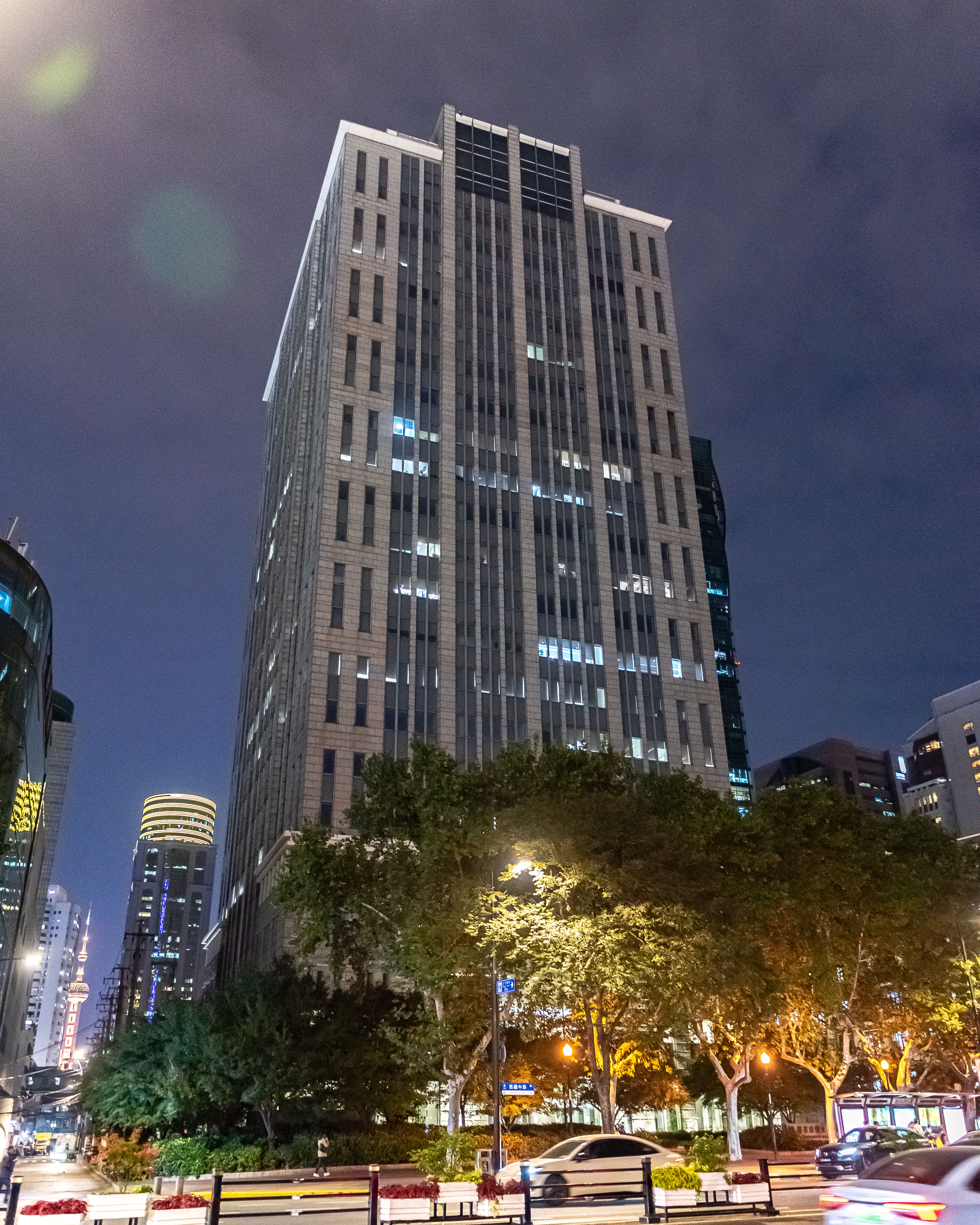
- The Headquarters Building which houses the office

Agency overview
- Formed: September 2006
- Jurisdiction: Government of Hong Kong
- Headquarters: 21F, Metropolitan Headquarters Building, No. 168, Xizang Middle Road, Huangpu, Shanghai
- Agency executive: Laura Liang Aron, Director
- Parent department: Administration Wing
- Parent agency: Constitutional and Mainland Affairs Bureau
- Website: www.sheto.gov.hk/tc/home/index.html

The Hong Kong Economic and Trade Office in Shanghai is the representative office of the Government of Hong Kong in Shanghai, China.

== History ==
With the approval of the State Council, the Hong Kong Office in Shanghai was officially established in September 2006. In April 2015, the Liaison Office in Shandong was established in Jinan City, responsible for promoting bilateral economic and trade relations between Hong Kong and Shandong. In April 2017, the Liaison Office in Zhejiang was established in Hangzhou City, responsible for promoting bilateral economic and trade relations between Hong Kong and Zhejiang.

== Main functions ==
Hong Kong Economic and Trade Offices and Liaison Offices in the Mainland. The yellow area is the service area of the Hong Kong Economic and Trade Office in Shanghai.

The main function of the Shanghai Economic and Trade Office is to promote economic and trade ties and strengthen cooperation between Shanghai and the four provinces of Jiangsu, Zhejiang, Anhui and Shandong, and the Hong Kong Special Administrative Region.

== List of directors ==
1. Chen Zijing (August 14, 2006 - February 28, 2011)
2. Tam Wai-yee (March 1, 2011 - August 2014)
3. Deng Zhongmin (September 9, 2014 - March 30, 2020)
4. Cai Liang (March 31, 2020 - present)

== See also ==
- Hong Kong Economic and Trade Office
