= Lunang =

Township in Nyingchi Prefecture, Tibet Autonomous Region, China

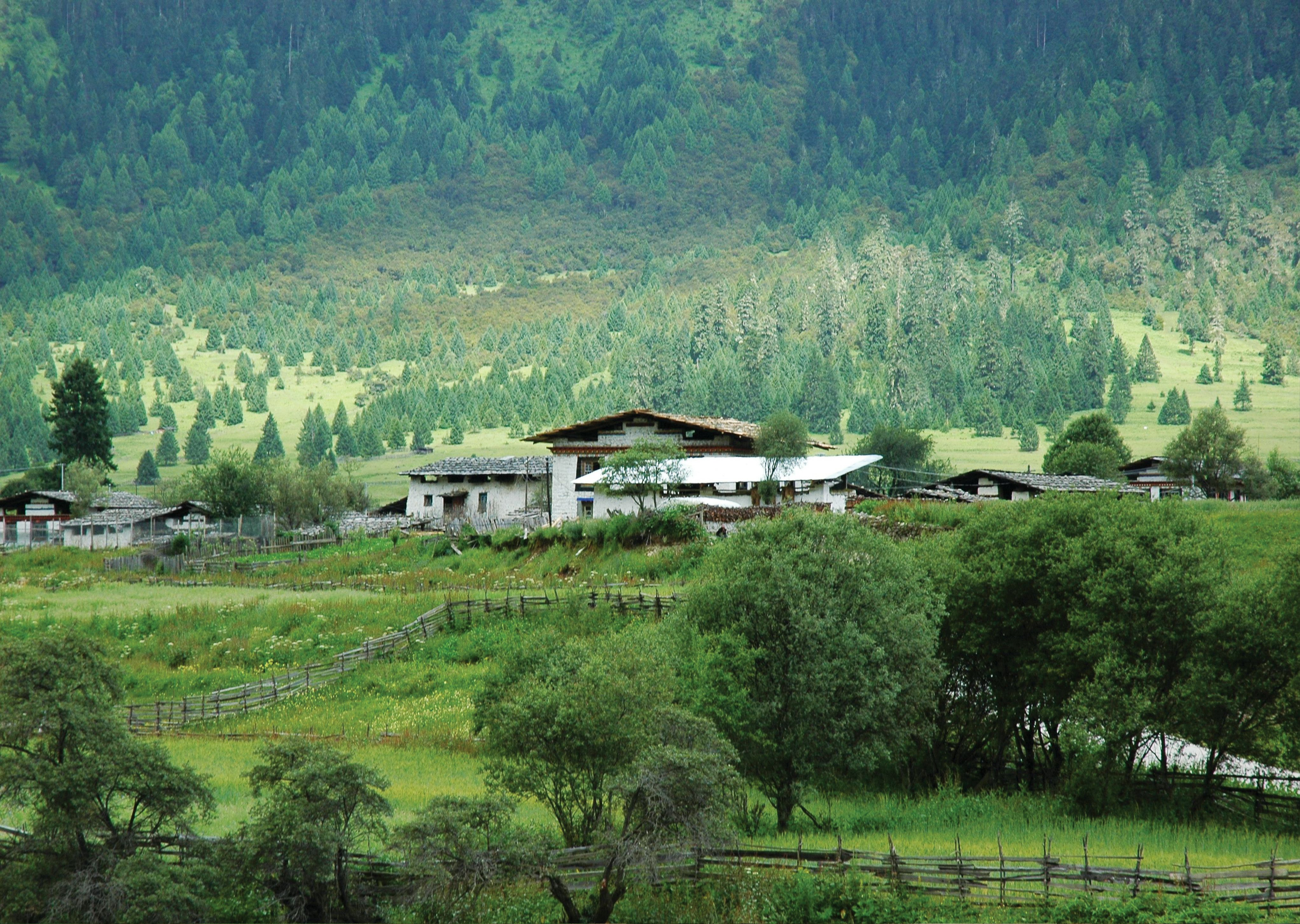
Lunang

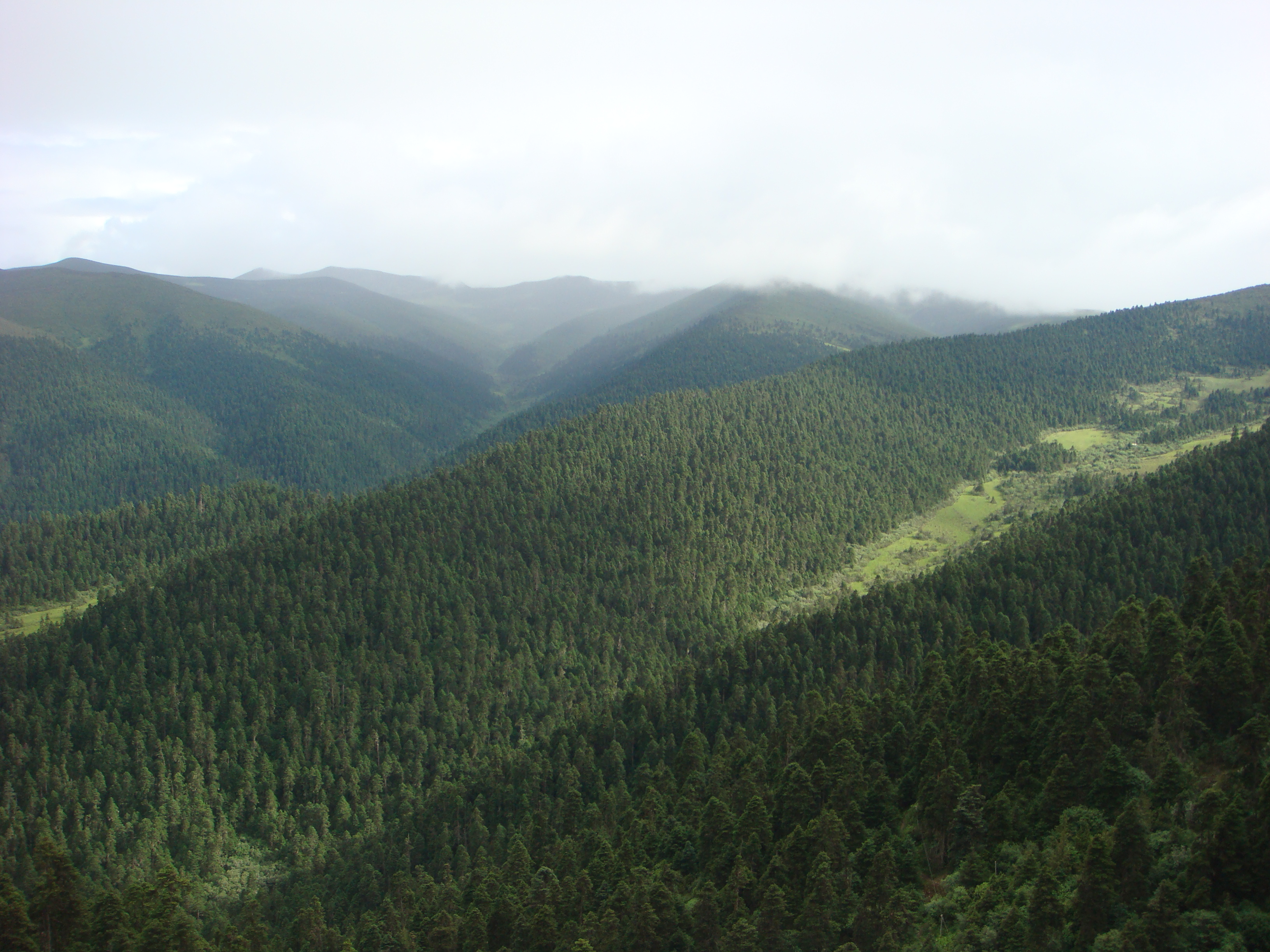
Lulang Forest Sea

Lunang, Lulang, or Lulang Town (Chinese: 鲁朗镇; Tibetan: ཀླུ་ནང་, Lunang) is a high-altitude township in Nyingchi Prefecture, Tibet Autonomous Region, China. Situated 70 kilometers east of Nyingchi City at 3,300 meters above sea level, it straddles the Sichuan-Tibet Highway (G318) and serves as a gateway to the Yarlung Tsangpo Grand Canyon.

== Geography ==
Historically a seasonal herding settlement for the Monpa people, Lulang was formally established as a township in 1988. Its name translates to "Dragon Valley" in Tibetan, referencing local legends of subterranean dragon spirits. The area gained strategic importance after the 1950 liberation of Tibet, with PLA troops constructing the first all-weather road through the valley in 1954.

The town is renowned for the Lulang Forest Sea, a 15-kilometer stretch of pristine alpine meadows flanked by spruce and fir forests, designated a National 4A Tourist Site in 2010. Ecotourism drives its economy, with homestays in Zaxigang Village offering traditional Monpa wood-carved architecture. A 2017 Guangdong-Tibet joint development project established the Lulang International Tourism Town, featuring sustainable infrastructure like solar-heated lodges and wastewater recycling systems.

Key cultural events include the annual Lulang Horse Festival in July showcasing Monpa equestrian skills and the Zhoqin harvest dance. The Tibet Ecological Conservation Institute monitors local biodiversity under a 2019 agreement limiting daily tourist entries to 2,000 visitors. Transport links expanded with the 2021 opening of the Lhasa–Nyingchi railway, reducing travel time from Lhasa to 3.5 hours.

== Culture ==
In August 2023, young artists from Zhuhai, Hong Kong and Macao went to Nyingchi for performances and exchanges. The events were held respectively at the White Egret Cultural Square in Mainling, the Nyingchi Convention and Exhibition Center and the Lulang Town.
