= Hong Kong Economic and Trade Office =

Office for oversea affairs

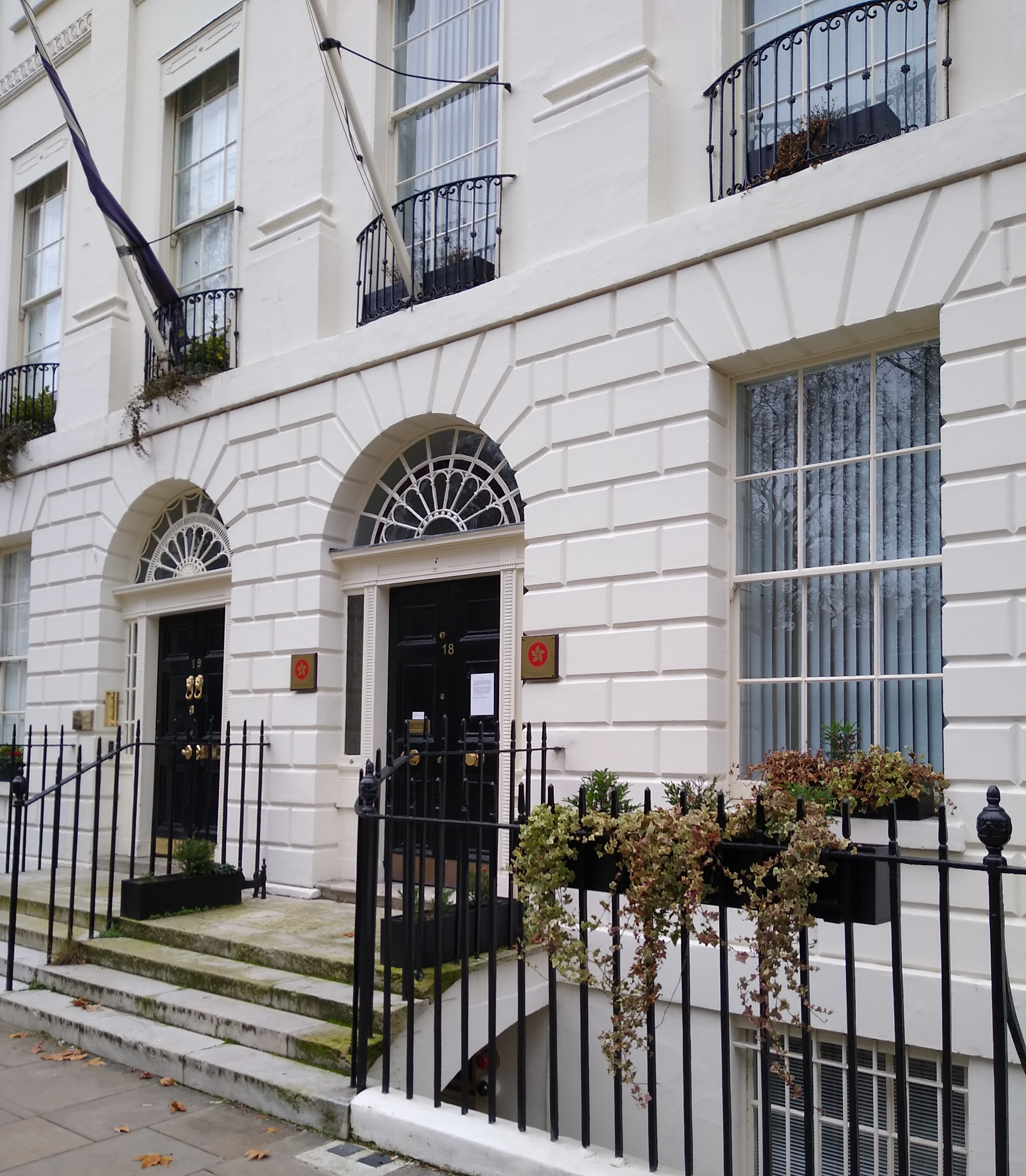
- 18 Bedford Square, London
- Traditional Chinese: 香港經濟貿易辦事處
- Simplified Chinese: 香港经济贸易办事处
- Jyutping: hoeng1 gong2 ging1 zai3 mau6 yik6 baan6 si6 cyu3
Transcriptions
Standard Mandarin
- Hanyu Pinyin: Xiānggǎng Jǐngjì Wénhùa Bànshìchù
- Wade–Giles: Hsiang-kang Chingchi Wenhua Panshihch'u
- Tongyong Pinyin: Siānggǎng Jǐngjì Wúnhùa Bànshìhchù
- Yale Romanization: Syānggǎng Jǐngjì Wénhwà Bànshr̀chù
Yue: Cantonese
- Yale Romanization: heūng góng gīng jái màu yik baahn sih chyú
- Jyutping: hoeng1 gong2 ging1 zai3 mau6 yik6 baan6 si6 cyu3

The Hong Kong Economic and Trade Offices (HKETOs) are the trade offices of Hong Kong outside the territory. There are 14 HKETOs outside Hong Kong and China, and seven in China (four offices and three liaison units).

In addition to HKETOs, the Hong Kong Government has an office in Beijing, the capital of China, called the Office of the Government of the Hong Kong Special Administrative Region in Beijing.

== History ==
Prior to the transfer of sovereignty in 1997, Hong Kong's commercial interests in its major trade markets were represented by Hong Kong Government Offices – consular matters were handled by the relevant British embassy or high commission. By 1982, the Hong Kong Government Offices, with locations in London, Brussels, Washington and Geneva, were placed under the then Councils and Administration Branch (Chinese: 兩局及行政科) of the Hong Kong Government.

In preparation for the handover, the British and Chinese governments agreed that these offices should be renamed "Hong Kong Economic and Trade Offices", to make clear that they did not have diplomatic or consular functions. In the United Kingdom, the Hong Kong Economic and Trade Office Act 1996 conferred a number of personal immunity and tax privileges on the HKETO in London.

Similar arrangements were negotiated with other host countries of HKETOs. For instance, the HKETO in Toronto is accredited by Foreign Affairs and International Trade Canada under the Hong Kong Economic and Trade Office Privileges and Immunities Order, and HKETO in Sydney by the Overseas Missions (Privileges and Immunities) Act 1995.

Hong Kong Free Press revealed that HKTDC paid around HKD $84,000,000 from 2014 to 2020 to US lobbying firms, on behalf of the Hong Kong government, in an attempt to convince US politicians to object to the Hong Kong Human Rights and Democracy Act. The lobbyist contracts were signed by the HKTDC, and the HKETO in Washington D.C. gave instructions to the lobbyists.

== Functions ==
Hong Kong has full autonomy in the conduct of its external commercial relations. The Basic Law of the Hong Kong provides that it shall be a separate customs territory and may, using the name 'Hong Kong, China', participate in relevant international organisations and international trade agreements, such as the World Trade Organization.

The HKETOs concentrate most of their work on promoting Hong Kong's economic and trade interests. The major function of HKETOs include:

- Enhancing understanding of Hong Kong among opinion-formers
- Monitoring developments that might affect Hong Kong's economic and trading interests
- Liaising closely with the business and commercial sectors, politicians and the news media.
- Organise events to promote Hong Kong's image
- Regularly meeting with counterparts and contacts in the territories under their purview
- Organizes overseas visits of senior Hong Kong officials

HKETO London serves concurrently as Hong Kong's permanent mission to the International Maritime Organization, HKETO Brussels to the European Union, and HKETO Geneva to the World Trade Organization.

In countries or territories where no HKETO is present, diplomatic missions of China have the duty to represent Hong Kong's interests. Visa applications at these missions are, nevertheless, sent to and processed by the Immigration Department of Hong Kong.

== Organisation ==
Overseas HKETOs are placed under the Commerce and Economic Development Bureau of the Hong Kong Government. Offices of the Government of the Hong Kong in Beijing and other parts of mainland China are placed under the Constitutional and Mainland Affairs Bureau. The head of the HKETOs are usually called Director.

== Privileges and immunities ==
The privileges and immunities granted to the HKETOs are the result of negotiations with the host governments and these vary from one office to another. In some cases, the host governments (such as the United Kingdom, Australia and Germany) have granted certain privileges and immunities to the HKETOs through dedicated domestic legislation.

At present, all eleven overseas HKETOs have been granted certain privileges and immunities by respective host governments to facilitate the HKETOs to discharge their duties without intervention. Broadly speaking, the privileges and immunities enjoyed by the HKETOs mainly include the inviolability of premises, official correspondence, archives and documents as well as the exemption of premises and representatives from taxation.

HKETO Berlin (Germany) is the only regional representative office that has a quasi-diplomatic status.

== Locations ==
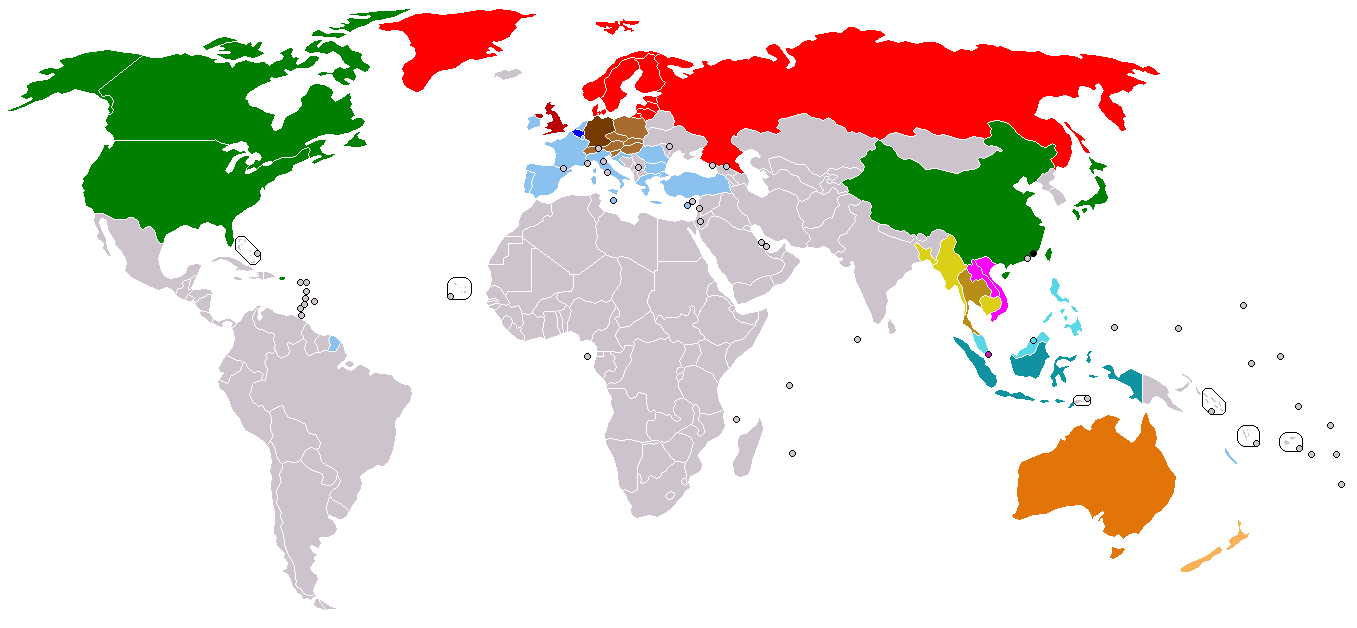
Countries hosting one or more offices ██ Bangkok office and covered countries ██ Berlin office and covered countries ██ Brussels office and covered countries ██ Jakarta office and covered countries ██ London office and covered countries ██ Singapore office and covered countries ██ Sydney office and covered countries

The HKETOs outside of mainland China, particularly those in Europe and Asia, have responsibilities for several countries. Those in the mainland similarly have responsibilities across several provinces.

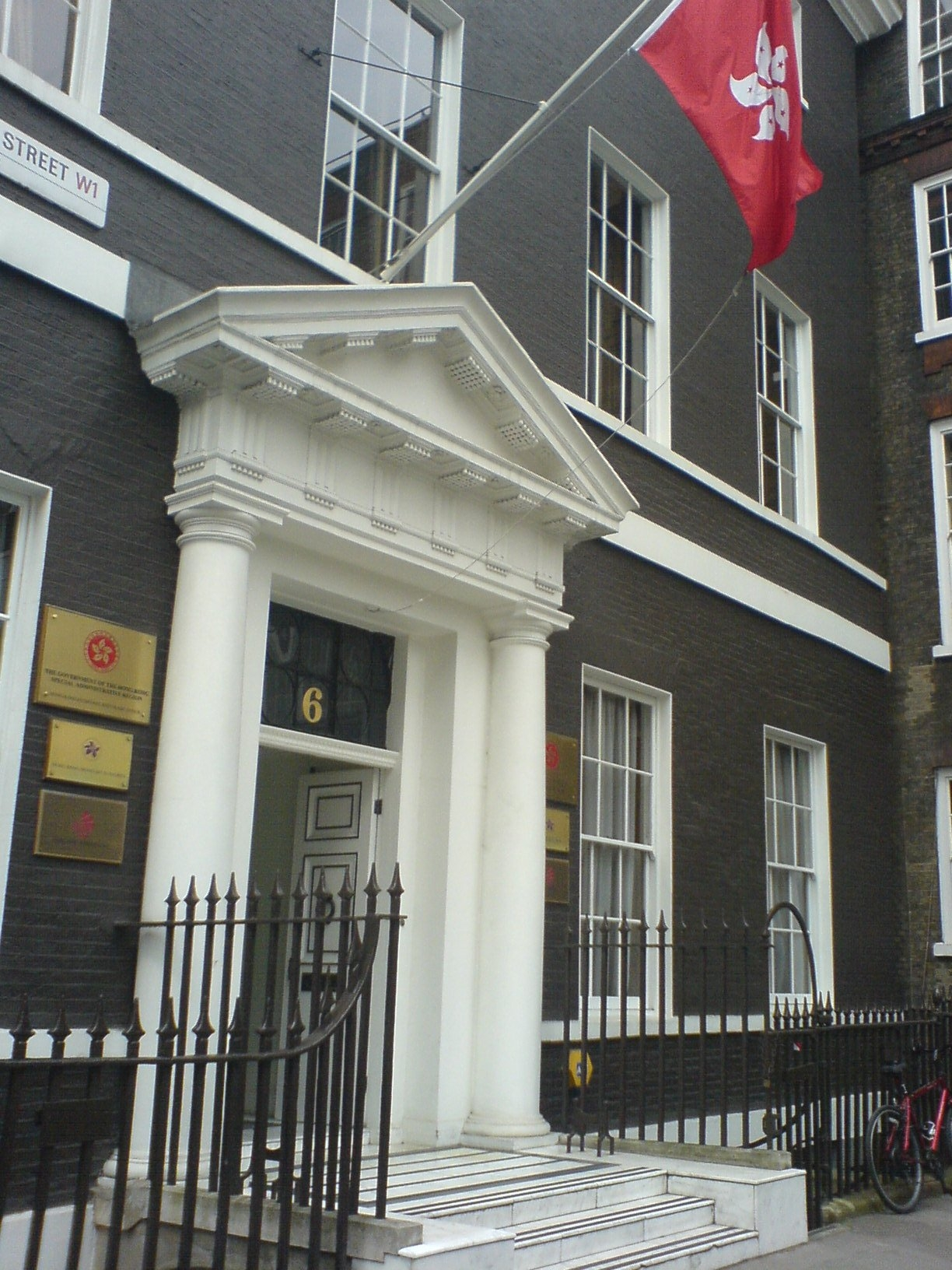
The building where Economic and Trade Office in London was formerly located.

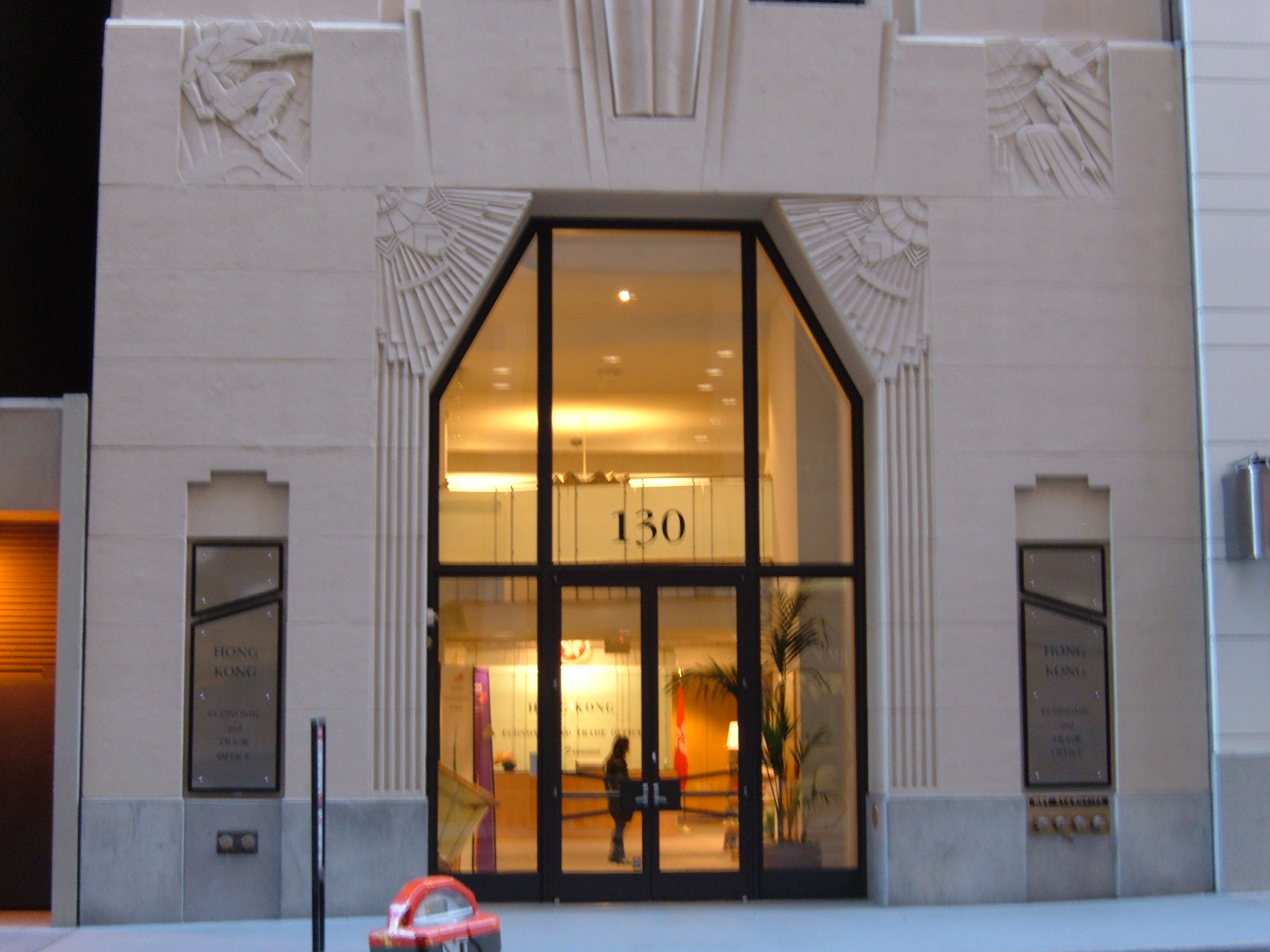
HK Economic and Trade Office in San Francisco, USA.

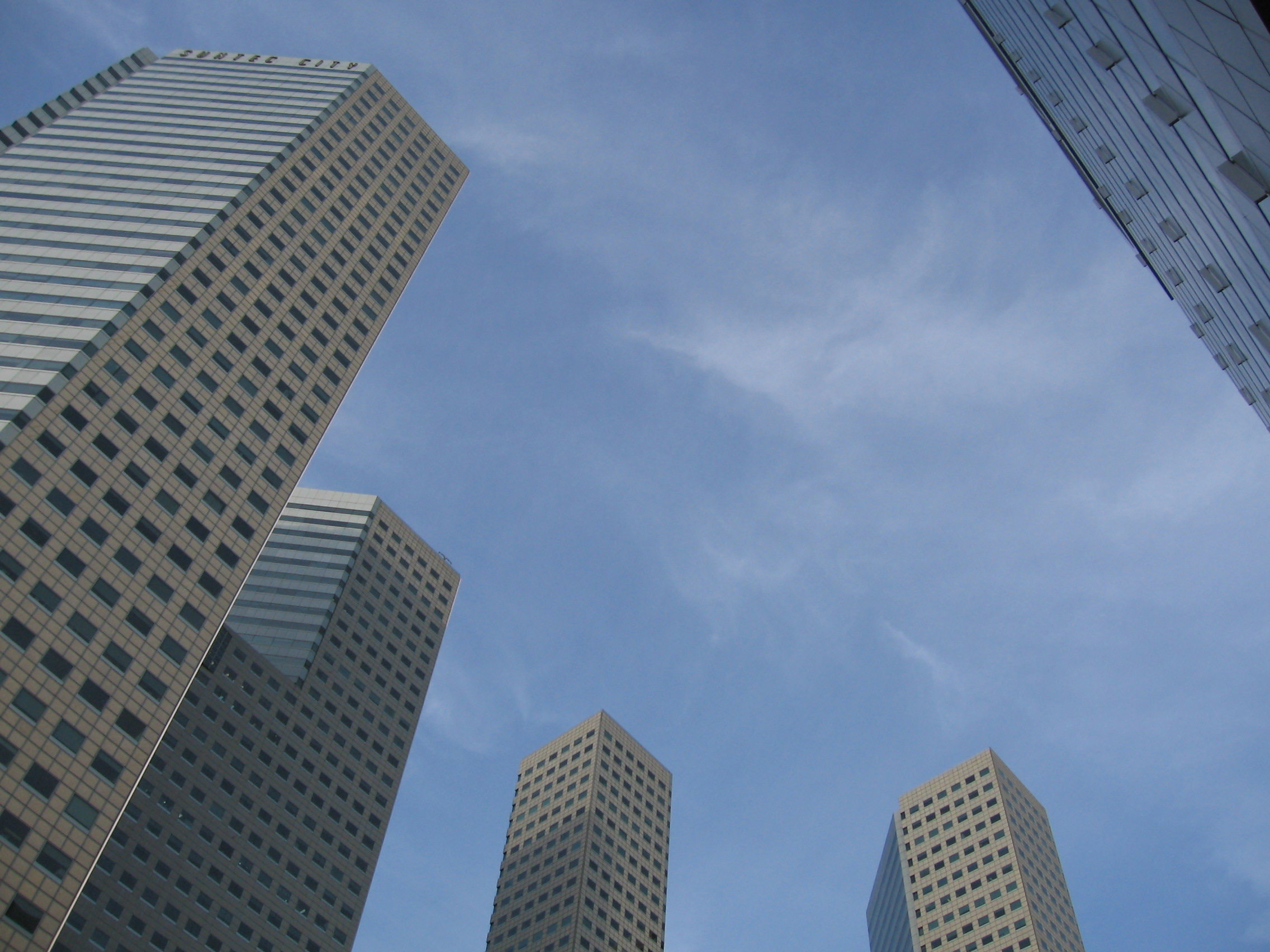
HKETO in Singapore, on the 34th floor of the office building at Suntec City Tower 2.

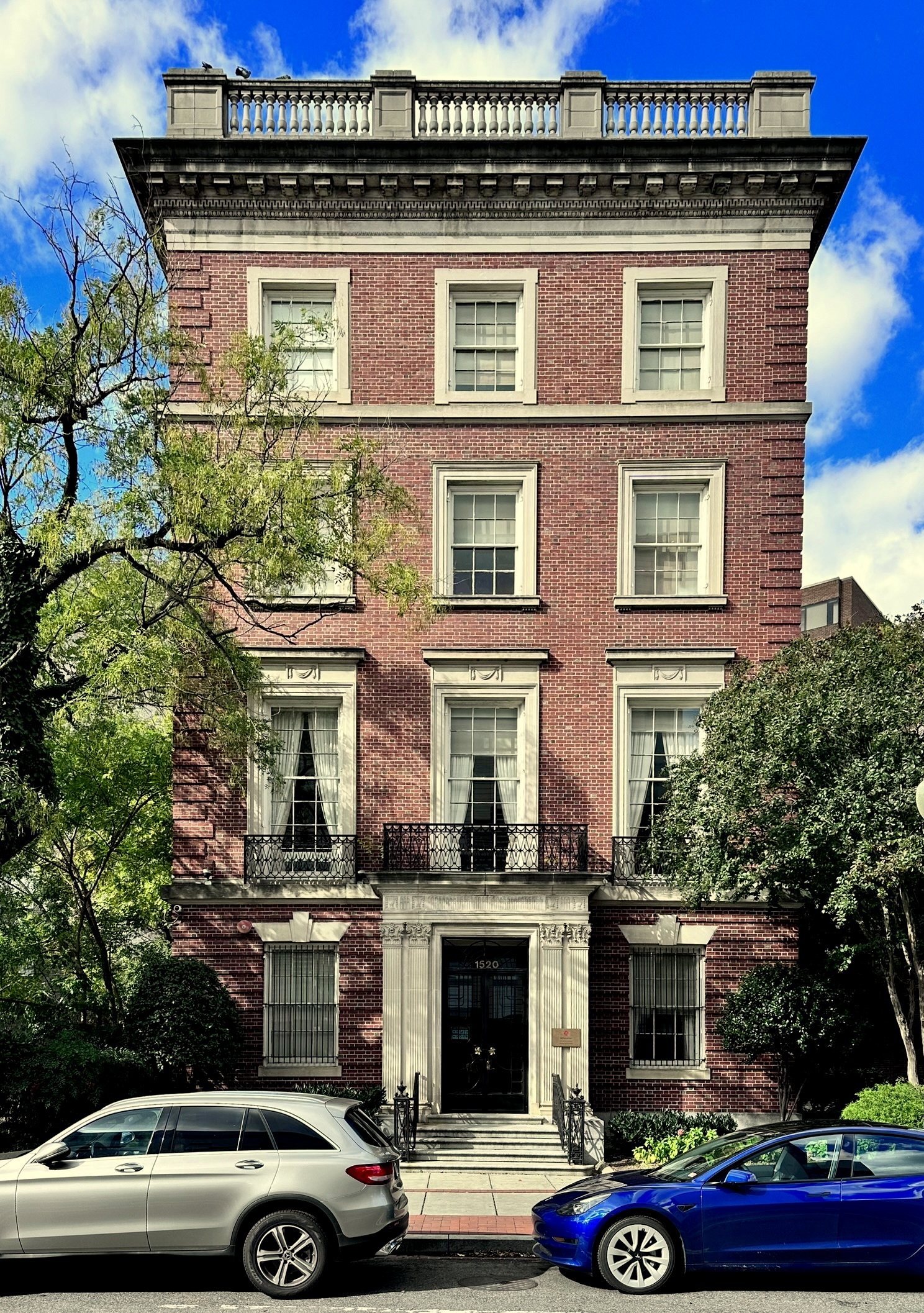
Hong Kong Economic and Trade Office in the Dupont Circle neighbourhood of Washington, D.C.

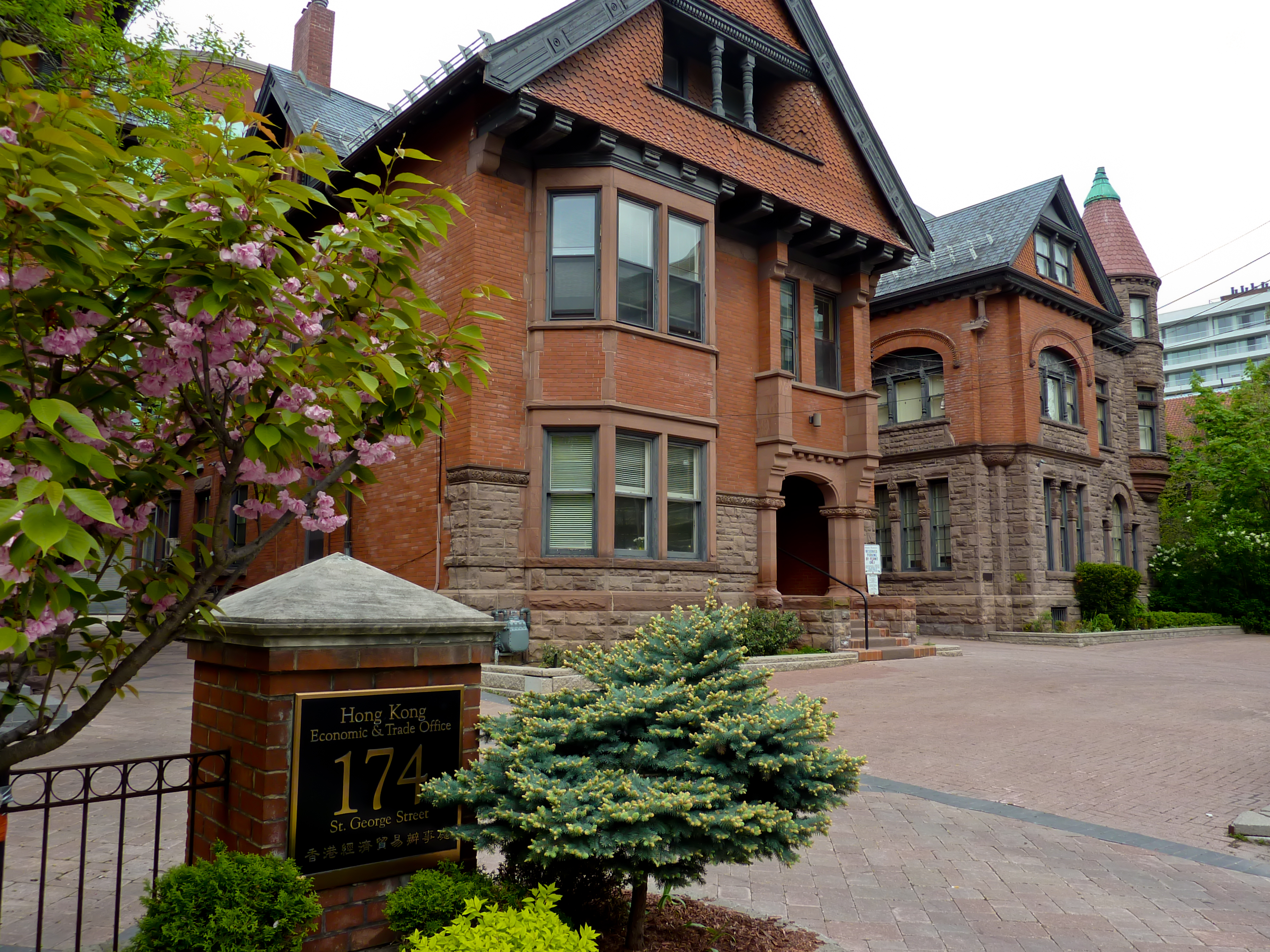
HKETO in Toronto, Canada.

=== Mainland China ===
- Chengdu – Hong Kong Economic and Trade Office in Chengdu
  - Chongqing – Chongqing Liaison Unit
  - Xi'an – Shaanxi Liaison Unit
- Guangzhou – Hong Kong Economic and Trade Office in Guangdong
  - Fuzhou – Fujian Liaison Unit
  - Shenzhen – Shenzhen Liaison Unit
  - Nanning – Guangxi Liaison Unit
- Shanghai – Hong Kong Economic and Trade Office in Shanghai
  - Jinan - Shandong Liaison Unit
  - Hangzhou – Zhejiang Liaison Unit
- Wuhan – Hong Kong Economic and Trade Office in Wuhan
  - Changsha – Hunan Liaison Unit
  - Zhengzhou – Henan Liaison Unit

=== Overseas ===
- Bangkok – Hong Kong Economic and Trade Office, Bangkok
  - Website: hketobangkok.gov.hk
  - Responsible for Bangladesh, Cambodia, Myanmar, and Thailand.
- Berlin – Hong Kong Economic and Trade Office, Berlin
  - Responsible for Austria, the Czech Republic, Germany, Hungary, Poland, the Slovak Republic, Slovenia and Switzerland.
- Brussels – Hong Kong Economic and Trade Office, Brussels
  - Website: hketobrussels.gov.hk
  - Responsible for the European Union and covering also the relations with Belgium, Bulgaria, Croatia, Cyprus, France, Greece, Ireland, Italy, Luxembourg, Malta, Netherlands, Portugal, Romania, Spain and Turkey.
- Dubai - Hong Kong Economic and Trade Office in Dubai
  - Member states of the GCC
- Geneva – Hong Kong Economic and Trade Office, Geneva
  - Responsible for the WTO and covering also the ISO, the Trade Committee of the OECD and the WMO.
- Jakarta – Hong Kong Economic and Trade Office, Jakarta
  - Responsible for the ASEAN and covering also the relations with Indonesia, Malaysia, Brunei Darussalam and the Philippines.
- London – Hong Kong Economic and Trade Office, London
  - Responsible for Denmark, Estonia, Finland, Latvia, Lithuania, Norway, Russia, Sweden and the United Kingdom.
- New York City – Hong Kong Economic and Trade Office, New York
  - Responsible for the 31 eastern states of the US.
- San Francisco – Hong Kong Economic and Trade Office, San Francisco
  - Responsible for the 19 western states of the US.
- Singapore – Hong Kong Economic and Trade Office, Singapore
  - Responsible for Singapore, Laos, and Vietnam
- Sydney – Hong Kong Economic and Trade Office, Sydney (located in Hong Kong House)
  - Website: hketosydney.gov.hk
  - Responsible for Australia and New Zealand
- Taipei – Hong Kong Economic, Trade and Cultural Office (temporarily suspended)
- Tokyo – Hong Kong Economic and Trade Office, Tokyo
- Toronto – Hong Kong Economic and Trade Office, Toronto
  - Vancouver – Information office
- Washington, D.C. – Hong Kong Economic and Trade Office, Washington, D.C.

== See also ==
- Foreign relations of Hong Kong
- Taipei Economic and Cultural Representative Office
- Consular missions in Hong Kong
- 2024 British Hong Kong spy case
