= Hong Kong Economic and Trade Office, Berlin =

Office of Hong Kong in Germany

Coordinates: 52.5142°N 13.3968°E

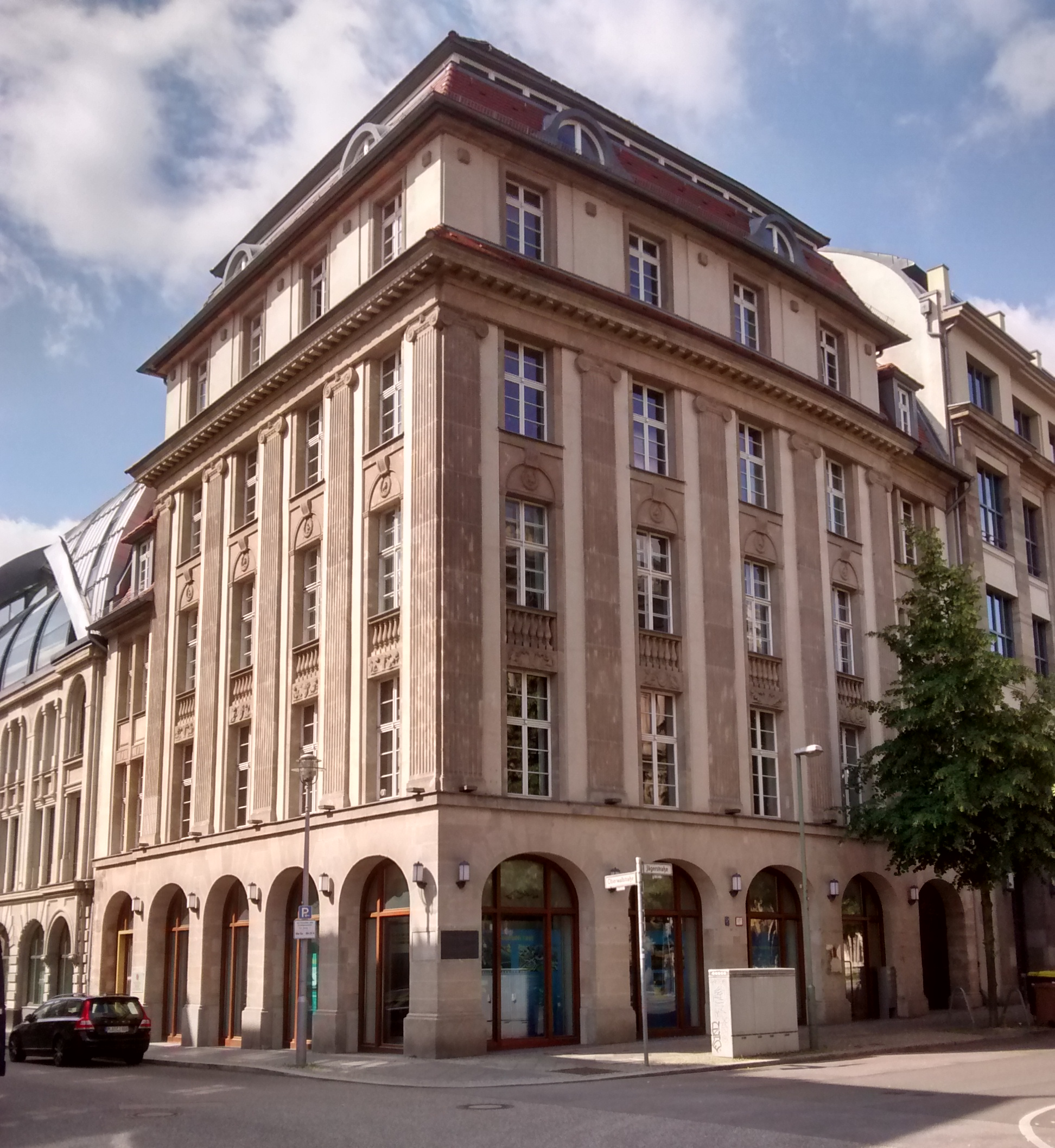
- Hong Kong Economic and Trade Office, Berlin

Chinese name
- Traditional Chinese: 香港駐柏林經濟貿易辦事處
- Simplified Chinese: 香港驻柏林经济贸易办事处
Transcriptions
Standard Mandarin
- Hanyu Pinyin: Xiānggǎng Zhù Bólín Jīngjì Màoyì Bànshì Chù
Yue: Cantonese
- Jyutping: hoeng1 gong2 zyu3 paak3 lam4 ging1 zai3 mau6 jik6 baan6 si6 cyu3

German name
- German: Wirtschafts- und Handelsbüro Hongkong, Berlin

Hong Kong Economic and Trade Office, Berlin (HKETO Berlin) commenced operation in Berlin, Germany in March 2009. It is responsible for promoting Hong Kong's economic and trade relations with eight Central European countries, namely Austria, the Czech Republic, Germany, Hungary, Poland, Slovakia, Slovenia and Switzerland. It is located in Jägerstrasse 33, 10117 Berlin, Germany. The Director of the Office is Betty SP Ho, who reports to the Special Representative for HK Econ & Trade Affairs to the European Union, Brussels ETO.

In recognition of the special status of Hong Kong as a Special Administrative Region of the People's Republic of China, and HKETO Berlin, an ordinance was passed in February 2009 by the Bundesrat of the Federal Republic of Germany. The ordinance grants HKETO Berlin the full set of diplomatic privileges and immunities, despite the fact Hong Kong is not a sovereign state.

Before it commenced its operations in Berlin, HKETO Berlin had its temporary office in the office of HKETO Brussels, Belgium.

The official opening of HKETO, Berlin was held on 21 March 2011.
