= Constitutional and Mainland Affairs Bureau =

Policy bureau of the Hong Kong Government

- 政制及內地事務局
- Emblem of the Hong Kong SAR

Agency overview
- Formed: 2007
- Headquarters: 12/F and 13/F, East Wing, Central Government Offices, 2 Tim Mei Avenue, Tamar, Hong Kong
- Minister responsible: Janice Tse, Secretary for Constitutional and Mainland Affairs
- Deputy Minister responsible: Clement Woo, JP, Under Secretary of Constitutional and Mainland Affairs
- Agency executive: Maggie Wong, Permanent Secretary of Constitutional and Mainland Affairs
- Parent agency: Chief Secretary for Administration
- Website: cmab.gov.hk

Constitutional and Mainland Affairs Bureau
- Traditional Chinese: 政制及內地事務局
- Simplified Chinese: 政制及内地事务局
Transcriptions
Standard Mandarin
- Hanyu Pinyin: Zhèng Zhì jí Nèidì Shìwù Jú
Yue: Cantonese
- Yale Romanization: Jing jai kahp noih deih sih mouh guhk
- Jyutping: Zing3 zai3 kap6 noi6 dei6 si6 mou6 guk6

The Constitutional and Mainland Affairs Bureau is a ministerial-level policy bureau of the Government of Hong Kong responsible for the implementation of the Basic Law, including electoral matters and promotion of equal opportunities and privacy protection. The bureau also functions as the intermediary between the HKSAR Government and the Central People's Government and other Mainland authorities under the principles of "One Country, Two Systems", including the coordination of liaison between the HKSAR Government and Central authorities, promoting regional co-operation initiatives between Hong Kong and the Mainland, and overseeing the operation of offices of the HKSAR Government on the Mainland.

The bureau is headed by the Secretary for Constitutional and Mainland Affairs, currently Janice Tse

== History ==
The former Constitutional Affairs Branch was formed by a reorganisation of the Government Secretariat in 1989. Upon the handover on 1 July 1997, the Branch was renamed the Constitutional Affairs Bureau. Under Donald Tsang's re-organisation of the Government Secretariat in 2007, the Bureau was renamed the Constitutional and Mainland Affairs Bureau to reflect the Bureau's portfolio for coordination of the HKSAR's relationship with the Mainland. In the re-organisation, the Bureau was also assigned portfolios relating to human rights and access to information as guaranteed in the Basic Law.

The Bureau has been responsible for Hong Kong's electoral reforms. Since the 1994 electoral reform, the Secretary for Constitutional Affairs has represented the Government in moving government bills for amending electoral laws in the Legislative Council. Pursuant to the last electoral reform sparked by amendment of Annexes I and II of the Basic Law by the Standing Committee of the National People's Congress on 31 March 2021, the Secretary for Constitutional and Mainland Affairs Bureau introduced the Improving Electoral System (Consolidated Amendments) Bill 2021 to the Legislative Council to amend local legislations accordingly. The Bureau released the Green Paper on Constitutional Development in July 2007 for public consultation on the options, roadmap and timetable for implementing universal suffrage for Chief Executive elections and Legislative Council elections.

The Bureau has also set up offices in the Mainland and Taiwan, including the Beijing Office of the HKSAR Government, Hong Kong Economic and Trade Offices on the Mainland and the Hong Kong Economic, Trade and Cultural Office in Taipei.

== Recent incidents ==
In October 2020, Apple Daily reported that the agency had ordered government departments to report any public sightings of the Republic of China flag, and to remove the flags when the public or media are not around.

In April 2022, the department revealed it had spent more than HK$16,000,000 on publicity to promote the 2021 Hong Kong electoral changes.

In May 2023, Hong Kong Free Press released an article, which discovered that the CMAB had funded the Equal Opportunities (Sexual Orientation) Funding Scheme since 2003, with some of the money going to groups that promoted changes to sexual orientation.

In May 2023, the CMAB submitted proposals to forbid insulting the Hong Kong flag, both in real life and on the internet.

== Agencies ==
The following are agencies which are related to this bureau.

- Office of the Government of the Hong Kong Special Administrative Region in Beijing
- Registration and Electoral Office
- Hong Kong Economic and Trade Office (Guangdong, Shanghai and Chengdu)
- Television and Entertainment Licensing Authority
- Office of the Privacy Commissioner for Personal Data
- Equal Opportunities Commission
- Hong Kong–Taiwan Economic and Cultural Co-operation and Promotion Council
- Basic Law Promotion Steering Committee

=== Registration and Electoral Office ===
The Registration and Electoral Office (REO) (Chinese: 選舉事務處) is a department under the jurisdiction of the Constitutional and Mainland Affairs Bureau (CMAB) of the Hong Kong Government. It is also an administrative support organisation of the Electoral Affairs Commission (EAC), which assists the implementation of the statutory rights under the Electoral Affairs Commission Ordinance.

The REO assists members of the public to register as electors, dividing constituencies, and formulating electoral regulations and guidelines for election activities. The elections of Chief Executive, Election Committee, Legislative Council and District Council are all managed by the office. However, the REO is a logistics department and has no decision-making power on the electoral policy as the decision-making power is vested in the EAC.

The REO is headed by the Chief Electoral Officer (CEO), who is assisted by the Principal Electoral Officers (PEO) and the Chief Systems Manager (CSM). The head office is at the Treasury Building in Cheung Sha Wan, with several other divisions at the Millennium City in Kwun Tong and Kowloonbay International Trade & Exhibition Centre in Kowloon Bay.

==== Registration Deadlines ====
Eligible residents may submit an application for new voter registration, and registered voters may report on change of registration particulars at any time of the year. However, electors who wish to have their registration processed or their information updated in the same cycle or to be listed in the final registers, they must submit their application forms to the Registration and Electoral Office on or before the statutory deadlines.

Type of Application	Statutory Deadlines	
New Voter Registration	District Council Election year (e.g. 2023):	2 July
New Voter Registration	Non District Council Election year (e.g. 2020, 2021 & 2022):	2 May
Report on Change of Particulars by an Elector	District Council Election year (e.g. 2023):	2 June
Report on Change of Particulars by an Elector	Non District Council Election year (e.g. 2020, 2021 & 2022):	2 April

==== Registration Statistics ====
Hong Kong has seen a major surge in voter registrations, particularly among young people. Nearly 386,000 people have registered to vote in the past year, a record high since the handover of Hong Kong. The Registration & Elector Office updates and publishes the Final Registers every year.

Year	No. of Electors in the Final Registers	Changes (YoY%)
2020	4,466,944	8.08%
2019	4,132,977	8.35%
2018	3,814,318	0.24%
2017	3,805,069	0.69%
2016	3,779,085	2.30%
2015	3,693,942	5.31%
2014	3,507,786	1.05%
2013	3,471,423	0.15%
2012	3,466,201	-2.65%
2011	3,560,535	3.76%
2010	3,431,592	1.73%
2009	3,373,342	0.04%
2008	3,372,007	2.31%
2007	3,295,826	3.45%
2006	3,185,927	-0.92%
2005	3,215,522	0.26%
2004	3,207,227	7.86%
2003	2,973,612	2.20%
2002	2,909,594	-3.25%
2001	3,007,244	

== See also ==
- Mainland Affairs Council
- Elections in Hong Kong
- Electoral Affairs Commission
- Home Affairs Department
- Election commission
- Independent Commission Against Corruption (Hong Kong)
- Clean Elections
