= Foreign relations of Hong Kong =

Hong Kong is a special administrative region (SAR) of the People's Republic of China (PRC). Under the Basic Law of Hong Kong, its diplomatic relations and defence are the responsibility of the Central government of China. Nonetheless, Hong Kong has considerable autonomy in all other aspects, including economic and commercial relations, and customs control. Hong Kong continues to be an active, independent member of the World Trade Organization (WTO) and the Asia-Pacific Economic Cooperation (APEC) forum under the name of Hong Kong, China. Hong Kong participates in 16 projects of United Nations Sustainable Development Goals.

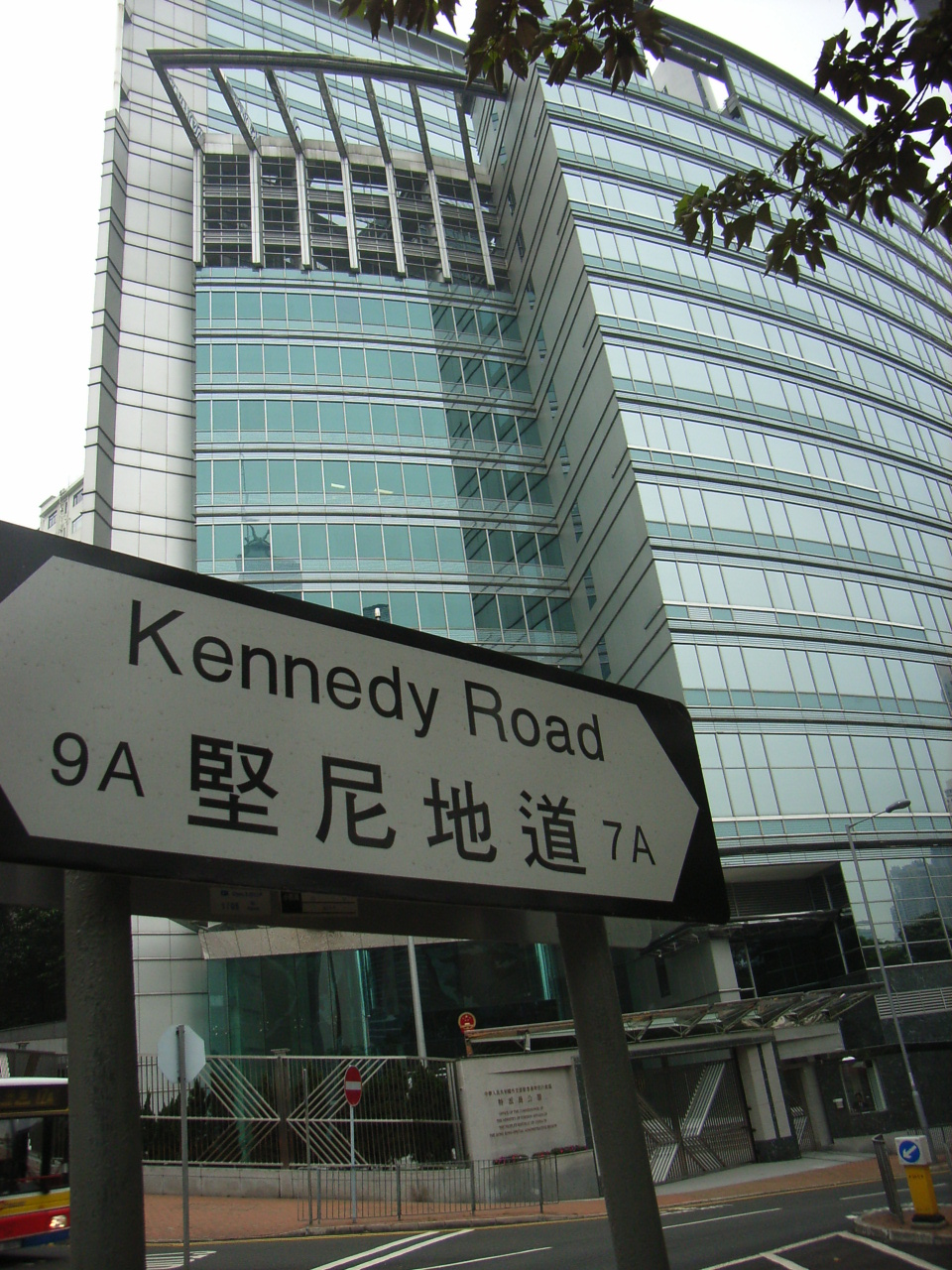
Office of the Commissioner of the Ministry of Foreign Affairs of the PRC in the Hong kong SAR

== Overview ==
Visitors from other countries and regions not participating in waiver programme are required to apply for visas directly to the Hong Kong Immigration Department.

According to the official data provided by the Hong Kong Immigration Department in January 2020, There are 168 countries and regions that implement visa-free policies for residents holding Hong Kong passports.

== Hong Kong Economic and Trade Office ==
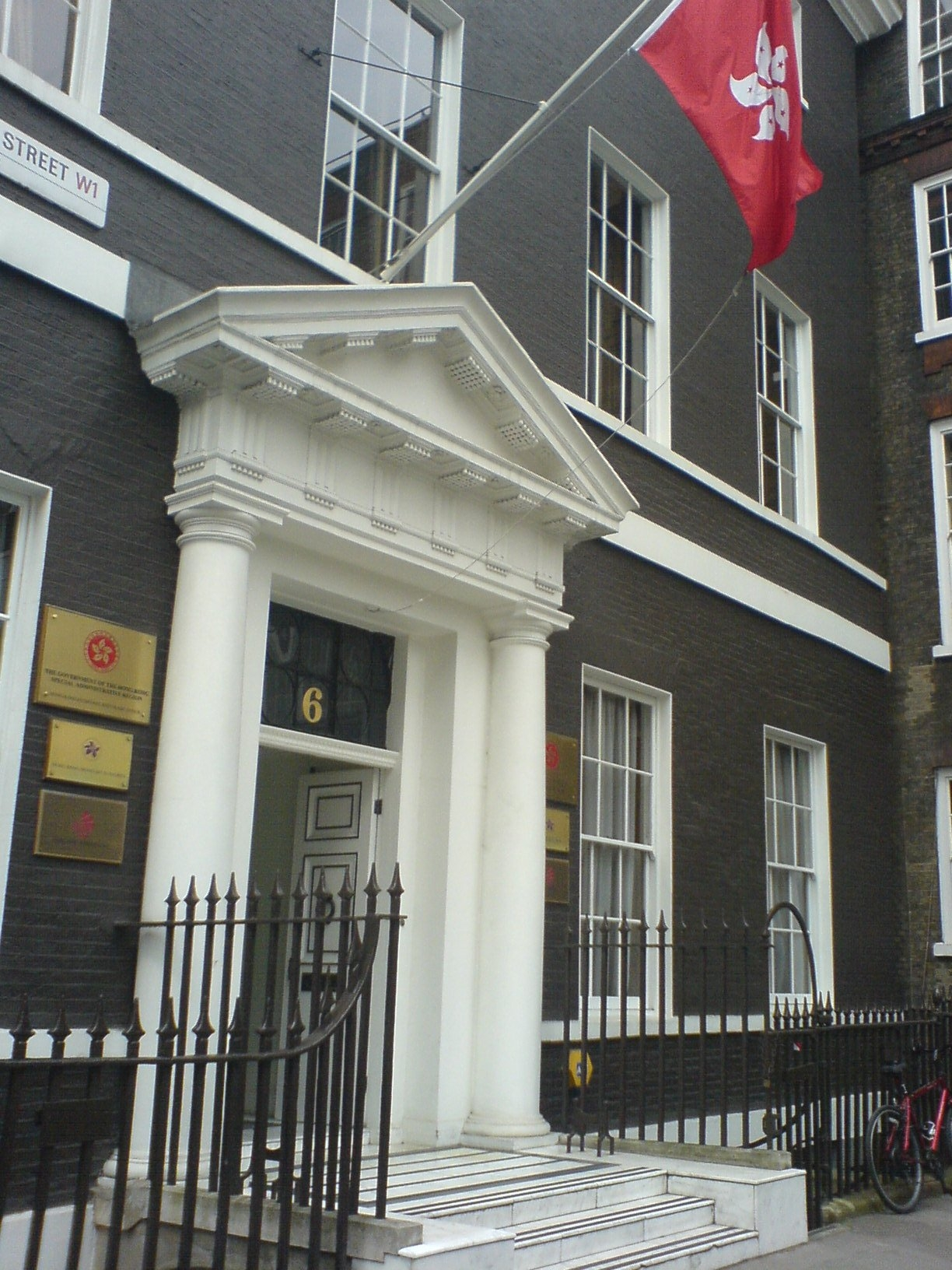
Economic and Trade Office in London.

Hong Kong was under British rule before 1 July 1997. Prior to the implementation of the Hong Kong Economic and Trade Office Act 1996 enacted by the British Parliament, Hong Kong represented its interests abroad through the Hong Kong Economic and Trade Offices (HKETOs) and via a special office in the British Embassies or High Commissions, but the latter ceased after the sovereignty of Hong Kong was transferred to the PRC and it became a special administrative region (SAR) of the PRC in 1997. At present, the Government of the Hong Kong Special Administrative Region maintains the Hong Kong Economic and Trade Offices in countries that are the major trading partners of Hong Kong, including Japan, Canada, Australia, Singapore, Indonesia, the United Kingdom, Germany, the United States, the European Union as well as an ETO in Geneva to represent HKSAR Government in the WTO. These offices serve as the official representative of the Government of the Hong Kong SAR in these countries and international organisations. Its major functions include facilitating trade negotiations and handling trade related matters, inter-government relations with foreign governments; the promoting of investment in Hong Kong; and liaising with the media and business community. The Hong Kong Government has also set up the Hong Kong Tourism Board with offices in other countries and regions to promote tourism.

== International agreements ==
In accordance with Article 151 of the Basic Law, Hong Kong concluded over 20 agreements with foreign states in 2010 on matters such as economic and financial co-operation, maritime technical co-operation, postal co-operation and co-operation on wine-related businesses. Under the Basic Law, the Hong Kong also concluded 12 bilateral agreements with foreign states on air services, investment promotion and protection, mutual legal assistance and visa abolition during the year.

== Free trade agreement ==
=== Officially signed ===
- Mainland China (CEPA) (June 2003)
- New Zealand (March 2010)
- Chile (September 2012)
- Iceland (October 2012)
- Liechtenstein (October 2012)
- Switzerland (October 2012)
- Norway (November 2012)
- Macao (October 2017)
- Georgia (June 2018)
- Australia (March 2019)
- ASEAN：Ten ASEAN countries (June 2019)
- Maldives (negotiations completed)

=== Negotiating ===
- Pacific Alliance
- RCEP
- United Kingdom

From the Chief Executive's Policy Address in October 2018.

== International organisations ==
Flag of Hong Kong, China in the Olympic Games

Hong Kong participates in 41 intergovernmental international organisations with countries as participating units. Hong Kong participates in 54 intergovernmental international organisations that do not use countries as their participating units.

Hong Kong participates in the following international organizations:

- APEC (Since 1995)
- G20
- Asian Development Bank
- The World Bank Group
- Bank for International Settlements
- Economic and Social Commission for Asia and the Pacific (Associate)
- Financial Action Task Force on Money Laundering
- International Chamber of Commerce
- International Confederation of Free Trade Unions
- International Hydrographic Organization
- International Maritime Organization (Associate)
- International Monetary Fund (Since 2001)
- International Olympic Committee (through Hong Kong Olympic Committee)
- International Organization for Standardization (Correspondent)
- Interpol (Sub-Bureau)
- Universal Postal Union
- Venerable Order of Saint John (Associated Body)
- World Confederation of Labour
- World Customs Organization
- World Meteorological Organization
- World Tourism Organization (Associate)
- World Trade Organization (Since 1991)

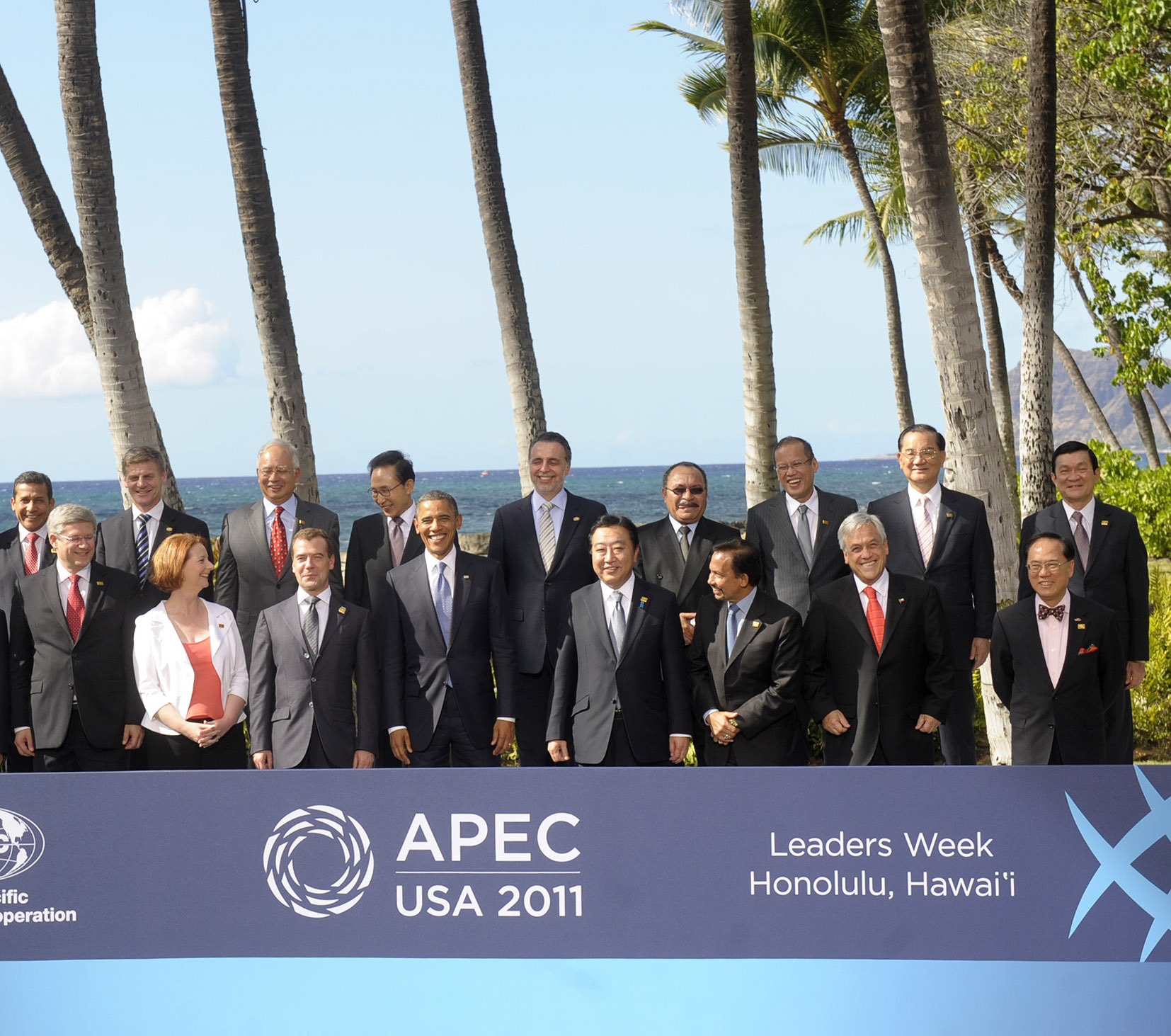
Chief Executive of Hong Kong Donald Tsang in the APEC

== Overseas visits by senior officials ==
Tung Chee Hwa shaking hands with Paul Martin, the Prime Minister of Canada at the Government House

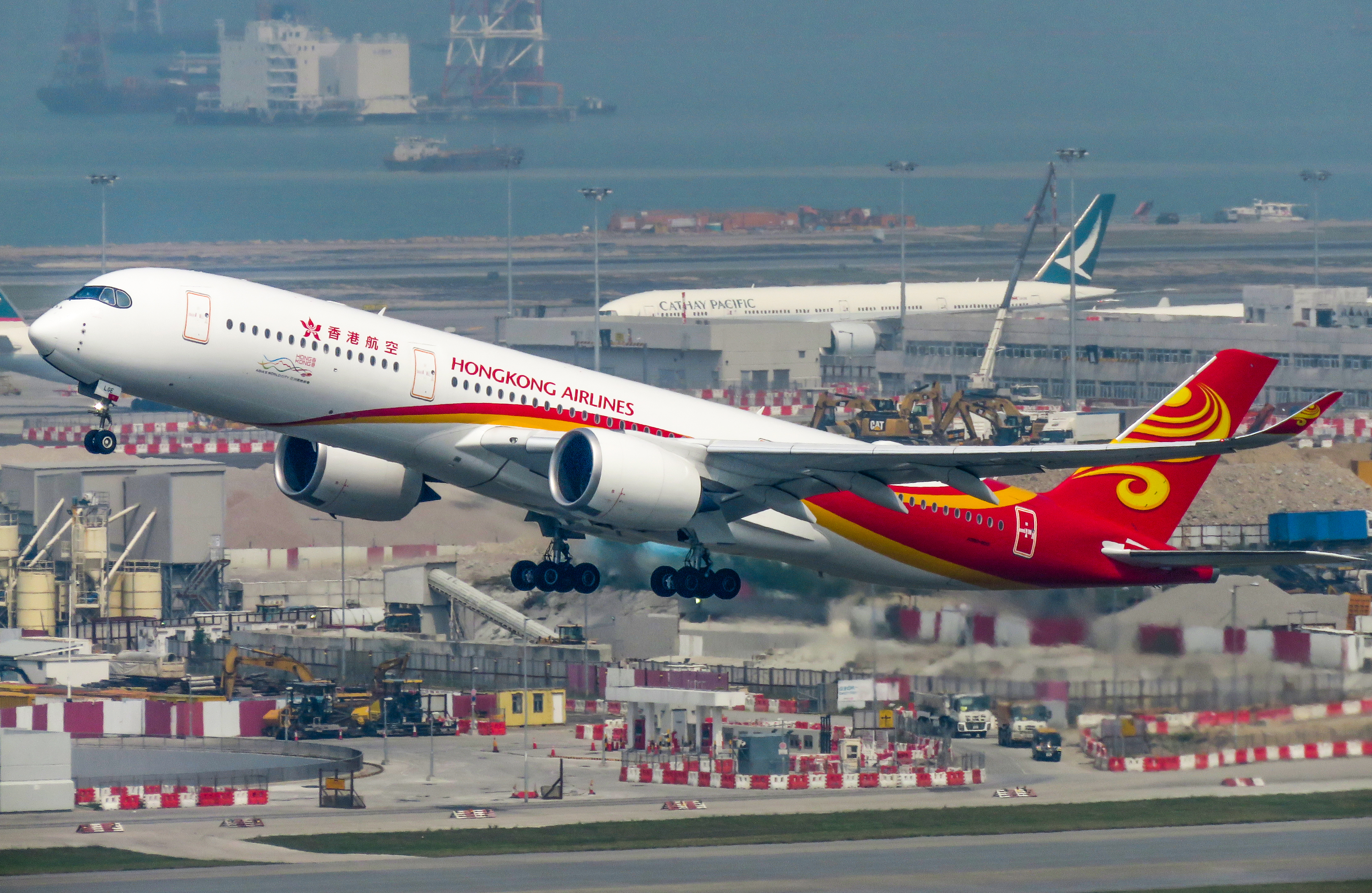
Hong Kong Airlines A350-900

Many foreign dignitaries visit Hong Kong each year. The number of such visits has grown since 1997 as many of them have included Hong Kong as a destination on their trips to China, while others have visited Hong Kong specifically to see "one country, two systems" in operation. The level of VIP visits is also boosted by major international conferences held in Hong Kong in recent years. President Aleksander Kwaśniewski of Poland was the first head of state to make an official visit to Hong Kong after the handover, on 20 November 1997.

=== Protocol Division Government Secretariat ===
The Protocol Division Government Secretariat is responsible for liaising with the large consulate groups of various countries stationed in the Hong Kong and providing host government services to these consular groups. The Protocol Division Government Secretariat also represents Hong Kong government to receive national leaders and international organisations visiting Hong Kong, and plan and coordinate official visits to Hong Kong by members of the foreign royal family and senior government leaders.

== Overseas representation in Hong Kong ==
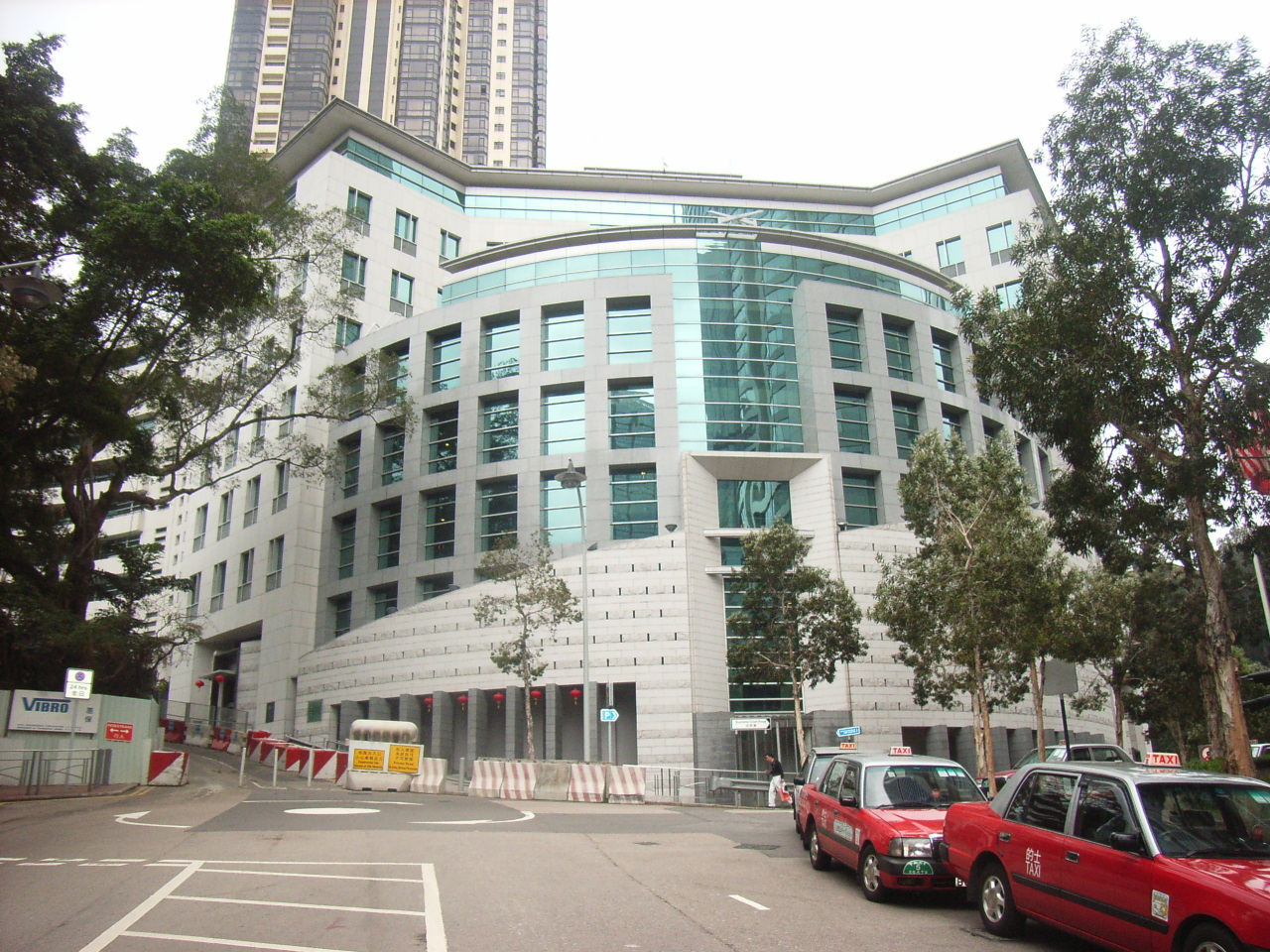
The British Consulate General in Hong Kong

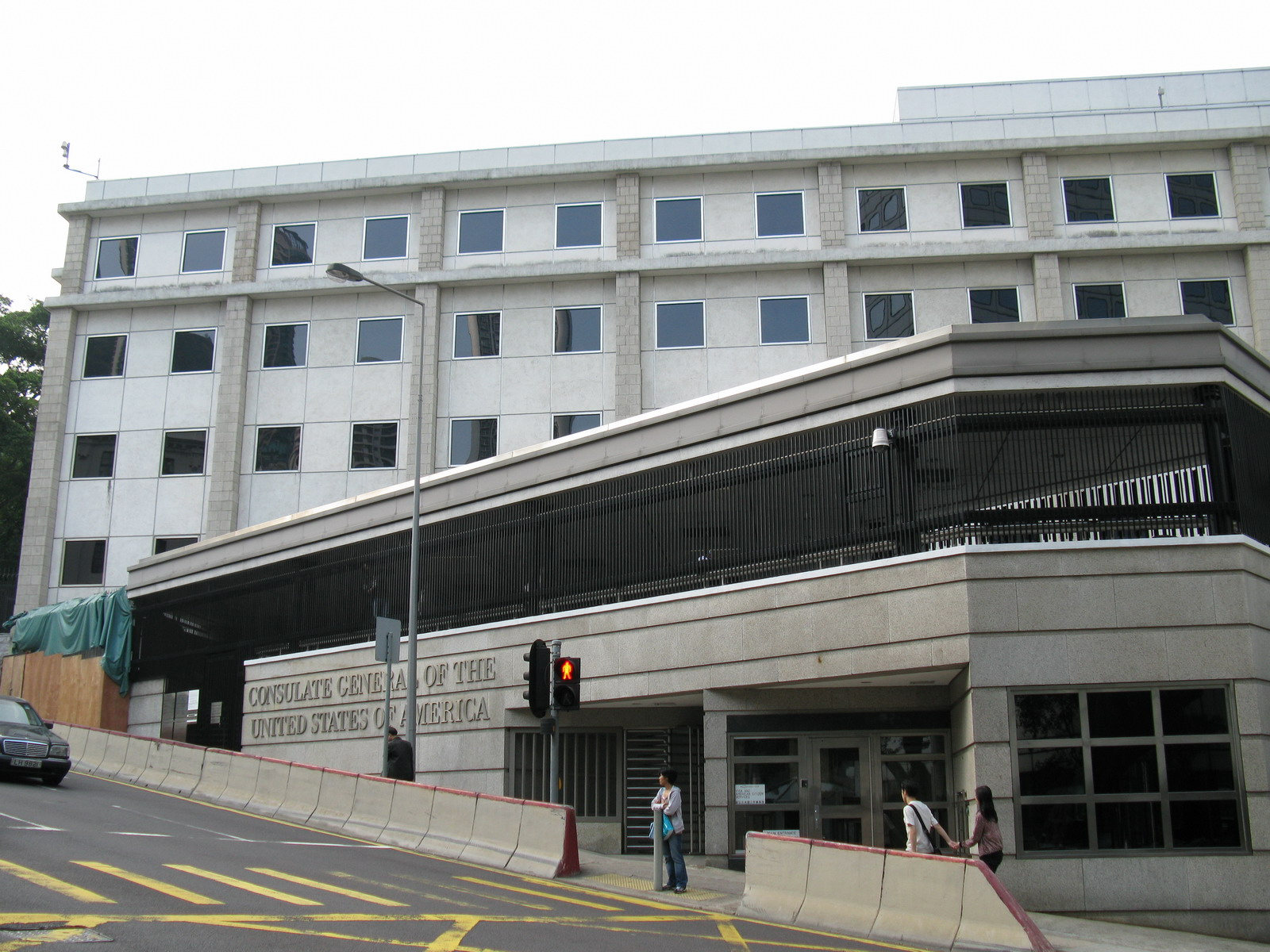
US Consulate General in Hong Kong

When Hong Kong was under British rule, most Commonwealth member states, unlike other countries, were represented in Hong Kong by Commissions. However, following the 1997 handover, they were all renamed Consulates-General. Owing to Hong Kong's economic importance, and the large number of British passport holders, the British Consulate-General is the largest of its kind in the world and bigger than many British Embassies and High Commissions abroad.

Most countries maintain Consulates-General or Consulates in Hong Kong. However, despite their name, many Consulates-General are not subordinate to their country's embassy to the PRC in Beijing.

== See also ==
- Foreign relations of China
  - Foreign relations of Macau
- Hong Kong Economic and Trade Office
- Consular missions in Hong Kong
- Hong Kong–United Kingdom relations
- Hong Kong–United States relations
- Visa policy of Hong Kong
