= Municipal Solid Waste Charging Scheme (Hong Kong) =

Local policies

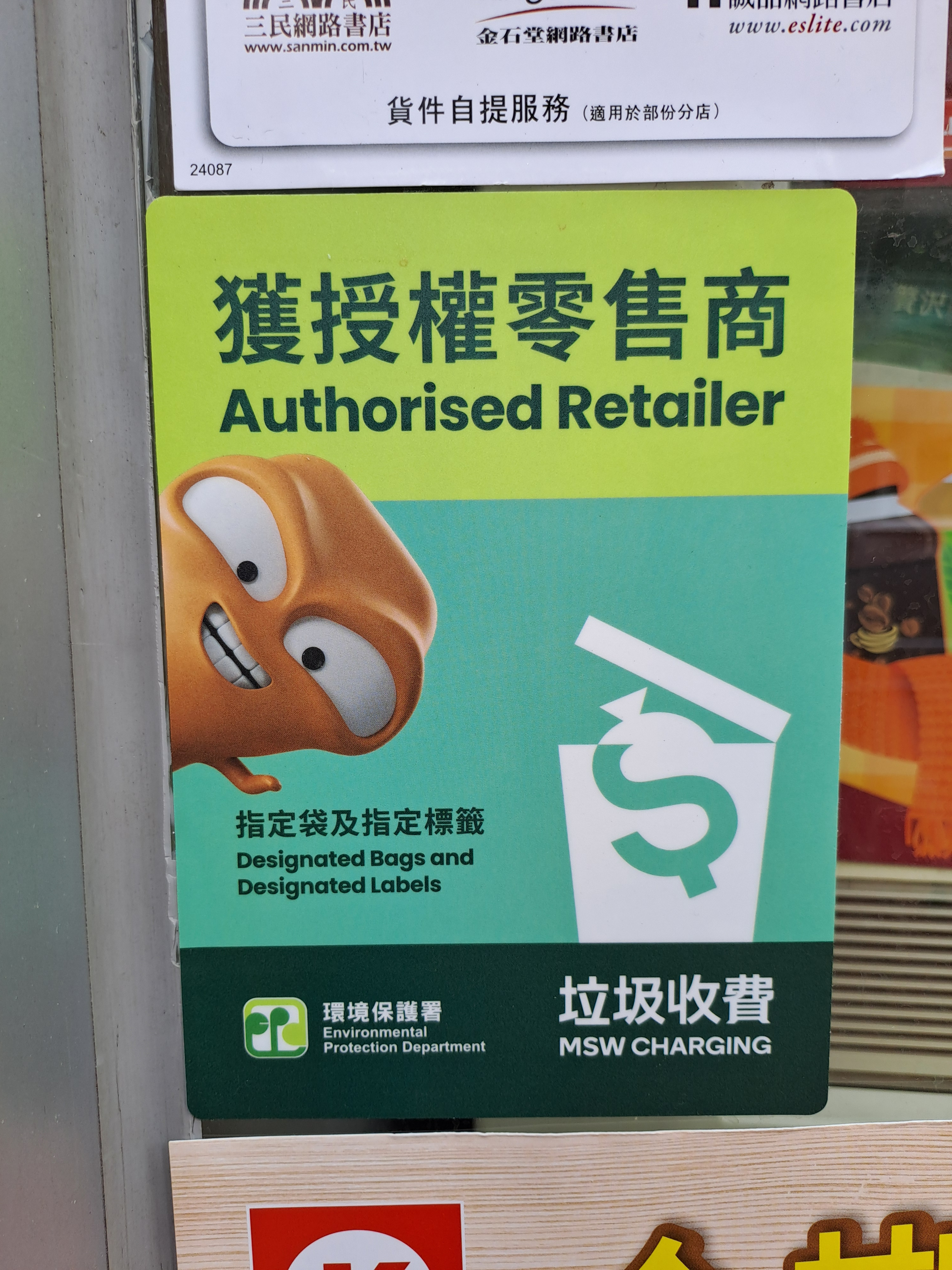
HKSAR MSW Charging Authorised Retailer Label

The Municipal Solid Waste Charging Scheme (Hong Kong), also known as the Waste Disposal (Charging for Municipal Solid Waste) (Amendment) Bill 2018, is a system for managing solid waste in Hong Kong. It implements legislation that takes effect on 1 April 2024. It adopts the 'polluter-pay' principle as first suggested by the government in 2005. It provides economic incentives for the general public to be aware of waste disposal volumes and reduce the waste they create by requiring individuals to purchase designated garbage bags or labels before disposing their trash. Waste reduction was seen as a way to delay expanding Municipal Solid Waste treatment facilities. Lessons were taken from experiences in cities such as Seoul and Taipei.

A six-month phase-in period will begin on 1 April 2024 to smooth the transition to the new system, using verbal warnings rather than strict enforcement.

== Program ==
Public are charged either through designated bags or labels, or gate fee. Non-compliance results in a $1,500 fine per penalty notice.

Income from the scheme funds recycling support. Designated bags and labels can be purchased in authorised retail outlets, including supermarkets, convenience stores, online platforms and pharmacies.

Nine sizes of designated bags range in size from 3L to 100L. The price is 11 cents per litre. Larger bags allow commercial or industrial institutions to fulfil their operational needs. Individuals can purchase designated labels for large-sized disposal waste at a price of $11. For gate-fee approach, individuals are charged by weight at a price of $365–395 per ton depending on the disposal location.

=== Designated Bag (DB) prices ===
Price schedule
Size	Price (HKD)
3L	$0.3
5L	$0.6
10L	$1.1
15L	$1.7
20L	$2.2
35L	$3.9
50L	$5.5
75L	$8.5
100L	$11

=== Gate fees ===
Gate fees
Disposal Locations	Fee per ton (HKD)
Island West Transfer Station Island East Transfer Station West Kowloon Transfer Station Shatin Transfer Station North West New Territories Transfer Station	$395
Other Refuse Transfer Stations Landfill sites	$365
No designated bags or labels need to be used

== History ==
=== Proposal ===
The HKSAR Government published 'A Policy Framework for the Management of Municipal Solid Waste (2005–2014)' in December 2005, offering an overview of suggestions and options in handling municipal solid waste issues. The Framework raised the 'polluter-pay' principle for the first time as a form of economic incentive for waste reduction through disposal charges and producer responsibility, with a target to be implemented in 2007 or before.

=== Trial ===
In November 2006, the Environmental Protection Department launched a three-month trial scheme in 20 housing estates, covering public and private estates as well as government quarters. The Department collected data and responses from residents and property management companies to explore the logistics and conduct a feasibility study.

Upon completion of the first trial, a progress report was submitted in April 2009, suggesting citizens' major concern was the enforcement effectiveness. The Department stated the importance of the ability trace waste sources, taking local constraints into account.

=== Public engagement ===
In January 2012, the Government launched the first stage of three-month public consultation on charging methods, offering 4 approaches to the general public. 63% of respondents supported the scheme, with 57% preferred charging based on weight. Based on the responses, the Government launched the second stage of four-month public consultation in September 2013 to explore citizens' opinions on the charging level, mechanism, and coverage.

The Environmental Protection Department rolled out a six-month pilot scheme in April 2014 in 7 housing estates. The estates were invited to select their preferred charging options among 3 choices, with data collected from the residents' waste disposal patterns analysed afterwards.

=== Introduction ===
In November 2018, the Government introduced the "Waste Disposal (Charging for Municipal Solid Waste) (Amendment) Bill 2018" to the Legislative Council, proposing 'charging by designated garbage bags' and 'charging by weight'. A 12 to 18-month preparatory period was planned to be allow preparation time for the government and stakeholders, including the general public.

Concerns against the Bill were mostly raised by members from the pro-establishment parties, with focus on enforcement challenges and particular sectors, such as the increase of costs. After around 34 hours of discussion from 15 meetings, the Bill Committee decided to pause, due to the insufficiency of time to complete discussions and submit the report before the term ended. This would mean the government could reintroduce the Bill in the next LegCo term.

However, since the term of the 6th Legislative Council was extended for a year due to the pandemic, and the Bill was reactivated. The Government had amended the Bill, adding an 18-month preparatory period and free collection of food wastes from restaurants. The amendments were welcomed by the majority of the Committee members. As a result, the Bill was given third reading on 26 August 2021, and passed with 37 votes.

=== Implementation postponements ===
In June 2022, the Government announced that it would conduct an open tender exercise for the production of designated garbage bags, with a target of announcing results by the year-end. However, the Government canceled the tender in November, claiming that the prices were higher than expected. The exercise was reopened in April 2023 with amendments, including the reduction of the ratio of renewable materials and allowing bidders to produce non-locally.

In July 2023, the Government postponed implementation from Q4 2023 to April 2024.

In August 2023, the Government announced that four companies had won the bag contracts.

== Overseas experiences ==
=== Taipei ===
The HKSAR Government referenced the MSW charging scheme in Taipei. According to the Government, the scheme reduced the amount of MSW in Taipei by 30%.

=== Seoul ===
South Korea's MSW charging scheme relies on a per bag trash collection fee, in which multi-story buildings are placed in one of two categories. For high-rise residents buildings, non-recyclable waste must be separated and the rest is disposed of in designated public collection containers. For low-rise buildings, residents separate the recyclables, but the waste is disposed of at the entrance.

Seoul stands out in its heightened focus on fly-tipping, i.e. avoiding trash bags. A reward system that relies on voluntary groups consisting of members from resident organizations and non-profit green advocacy groups encourages tipping off authorities if fly-tipping is sighted. Reporting is rewarded as a percent of the penalty fly-tippers are charged.

In rural areas, monitoring fly-tipping is more difficult. As a result, designated plastic bags are not mandated in these areas. Public collection boxes are responsible for collecting both trash and recyclables, and charges are shared equally by all residents.

== Controversies ==
=== Habit change ===
==== Property management ====
A Greeners Action interview in 2023 showed that frontline management staff have yet to understand the scheme. Information such as vending locations, designated bag prices, and appropriate disposal practices including collection points and types of trash charged are yet to be understood. Interviewees claim that lack of government education and training pose difficulties in changing habits.

==== Waste collection practitioners ====
Facing the scheme, Workers' Unions worry that frontline workers would face an abrupt change and operational challenge in collection practices, as there is insufficient personnel to monitor and report disobedient practices.

==== Government's response ====
Secretary for Environment and Ecology, Tse Chin-wan, explains that a 6 month adaptation period, in which law enforcement will be more lenient, would be introduced in order to change citizens' waste discharge habits through publicity and education.

==== Businesses ====
Nonetheless, there is potential for businesses to transfer the extra cost of municipal waste charge to consumers, as the charging scheme charges industrial and commercial polluters by weight per registered account, through centralised collection.

=== Financial burden ===
==== Grassroots ====
Workers' Unions claimed that the Municipal Waste Charge is regressive, punishing the grassroots. Any charge takes a larger portion of their income than of the middle and upper class. It fails to restrain the wasteful practices of the rich. Furthermore, non-CSSA beneficiaries, who are not major polluters, do not enjoy preferential treatment, and in turn face extra charges from their landlords or through buying designated bags.

==== Practitioners ====
Frontline staff worried that uncollected waste charges would be transferred from households to them when they collect unwrapped/unbagged MSW, given the difficulty of identifying non-conforming households.

==== Government response ====
The Environmental Protection Department attempted to alleviate financial burdens by introducing a 6-month distribution of free designated bags at public housing estates, 3-nil buildings, and rural villages. A permanent 10-dollar extra subsidy was introduced for CSSA beneficiaries.

==== Legislative council members ====
Hui Chi-fung, a member of the Legislative Council in 2017, stated that the government should promote the purpose of the scheme, namely to reduce the amount of MSW rather than increasing government income. He hoped that the government would not postpone the implementation date. However, he expressed concern about the burden on grassroots households. He suggested that the government could reduce the charges at first and long term subsidize low-income groups.

Another Legco member, Shiu Ka-fai, advanced similar views. He suggested increased financial support and that political organisation could set up fund-raising schemes to pay consumer costs.

=== Enforcement ===
==== Law enforcement ====
Environmentalists claimed that it would be hard for law enforcement to identify and validate usage of designated bags in practice, when sealed garbage chute systems, common in Hong Kong buildings, compress trash and tear the bags.

==== Property management ====
Property management practitioners would face difficulty in searching for scofflaws and ensure proper usage of designated bags, given that surveillance is unavailable/costly, and that they lacked enforcement power.

==== Noncompliant citizens ====
Street municipal solid waste collectors would face conflicts with disobedient citizens without enforcement power, but a heavy responsibility to city hygiene. Social workers fear that this might pose workplace safety risks.

==== Legislative Council members ====
Cheung Yu-yan claimed that the system was too complicated. Some people might be penalized by law enforcement for accidentally disposing of waste illegally. In addition, he questioned why restaurants were responsible for their customers. He stated that the amount of food waste depended on the customer, so restaurants should not be charged.

=== Health ===
==== 3-nil buildings ====
In 3-nil buildings, littering problems and hygiene hazards might arise from neglect and non-compliant disposal, as the effective 'by household' or 'by property' collection methods are unavailable in such premises.

==== Legislative Council members ====
Elizabeth Quat expressed concern about sanitation. As some citizens may refuse to follow the bill, they will dispose of garbage illegally, which could lead to hygiene problems. She hoped that the government could monitor some high-risk places, such as the three-nil buildings.

== Government preparation ==
To prepare for the implementation, the Government conducted works in: recycling, publicity campaigns, additional citizen support, and scheme management.

=== Recycling ===
The government set up more recycling points. In particular, the Environmental Protection Department set up more than 160 recycling points for the public through its GREEN @COMMUNITY programme.

Small recycling stores were to be set up in 50 public rental housing (PRH) estates. The stores reward residents who recycle frequently with designated recycling bags.

At the same time, given that 30% of MSW is food waste, the Government would facilitate central collection of food waste. The Government would launch a trial scheme to collect food waste from 100 public housing blocks by the end of 2023.

=== Publicity ===
The Government divided the promotion and public education into three phases. The first began in August 2023 and focused on publicising the implementation time and a "Recycle more, Dump less, Conserve more" lifestyle. The practices of different sectors were also discussed. The second phase was to promote different charging practises and educate the public. The third phase was to begin two months before the implementation date that focused on the retail network of the DBs and encourage the public to follow the bill.

Throughout the publicity period, the Government prepared promotional videos narrated in other languages and promotional radio broadcasts targeted for foreign domestic helpers as well as the elderly respectively.

=== Additional support ===
In view of the potential to burden low income residents, the Government agreed to provide them with 20 free designated garbage bags per month for the first six months to ease cultivating the habit of recycling.

A 10HKD monthly allowance would be offered to those who receive CSSA and Old Age Living Allowance.

=== Management ===
Two new systems were developed to manage the system, namely SIM (Smart Inventory Management) and MID (Manufacturing, Inventory and Distribution). SIM facilitates logistics and demand monitoring for both government and retailers, as well as providing public access to retail locations and reporting functionality. MID helps manage bag supply and labels.
