= Environment and Ecology Bureau =

Hong Kong policy bureau

- 環境及生態局
- Emblem of the Hong Kong SAR

Agency overview
- Formed: 2022
- Preceding agency: Environment Bureau
- Jurisdiction: Chief Secretary for Administration
- Headquarters: 15/F-17/F, East Wing, Central Government Offices, 2 Tim Mei Avenue, Tamar, Hong Kong
- Minister responsible: Tse Chin-wan, Secretary for Environment and Ecology
- Deputy Minister responsible: Diane Wong Shuk-han, Under Secretary for Environment and Ecology
- Agency executives: Janice Tse Siu-wa, Permanent Secretary for Environment and Ecology (Environment)/Director of Environmental Protection; Vivian Lau Lee-kwan, Permanent Secretary for Environment and Ecology (Food)
- Child agencies: Agriculture, Fisheries and Conservation Department; Environmental Protection Department; Food and Environmental Hygiene Department; Government Laboratory; Hong Kong Observatory
- Website: www.eeb.gov.hk

Environment and Ecology Bureau (EEB; Chinese: 環境及生態局) is a policy bureau of the Government of Hong Kong. The agency was established on 1 July 2022. The current (since 1 July 2022) Secretary for Environment and Ecology is Tse Chin-wan.

This bureau was newly established under the re-organisation of policy bureaux proposed by Carrie Lam, the fifth Chief Executive of Hong Kong, and was adopted by John Lee, the succeeding Chief Executive after Carrie Lam. On 19 June 2022, the State Council of China announced the appointment of Tse Chin-wan, previously the Under Secretary for Environment, as the first Secretary for Environment and Ecology.

As an expanded bureau compared to the previous Environment Bureau, the bureau is in charge of portfolios such as environmental protection, conservation of natural ecology, environmental hygiene, food safety, agriculture, fisheries and animal welfare. With the reassignment of the Hong Kong Observatory to the bureau, policies on climate change and meteorology are also under its purview.

== Subordinate departments ==
There are two branches managed by the bureau, with several departments under each branch:
Environment Branch

- Environmental Protection Department
- Hong Kong Observatory

Food Branch

- Agriculture, Fisheries and Conservation Department
- Food and Environmental Hygiene Department
- Government Laboratory

== Related agencies ==
=== Centre for Food Safety ===
Centre for Food Safety is the food safety authority under the Food and Health Department. Established in 2006, it replaced the role formerly under Food and Environmental Hygiene Department (created 1999) and Urban Services Department (pre 1999).

== History ==
The establishment of the Environment and Ecology Bureau was first propounded on 17 May 2022, under Hong Kong’s fifth Chief Executive Carrie Lam’s government structure reorganization proposal for the sixth-term. In composition and in purpose, it was designed to be a consolidated entity, formed from the partial merging of the now-defunct Environment Bureau and the Food and Health Bureau (4, page 2). Specifically, this agency was devised to synchronize policy-making developments across areas that previously fell at the intersection between its two precursive bureaus’ domains, such as “waste reduction and recycling, ecological conservation and development of agriculture and fisheries industries”.

The bureau was formally established on 1 July 2022, under the administration of Lam’s successor, Hong Kong’s sixth Chief Executive John Lee. On the same day, Tse Chin-wan, previously the Under Secretary for the Environment, was appointed as the first Secretary for the Environment and Ecology bureau.

== Structure ==
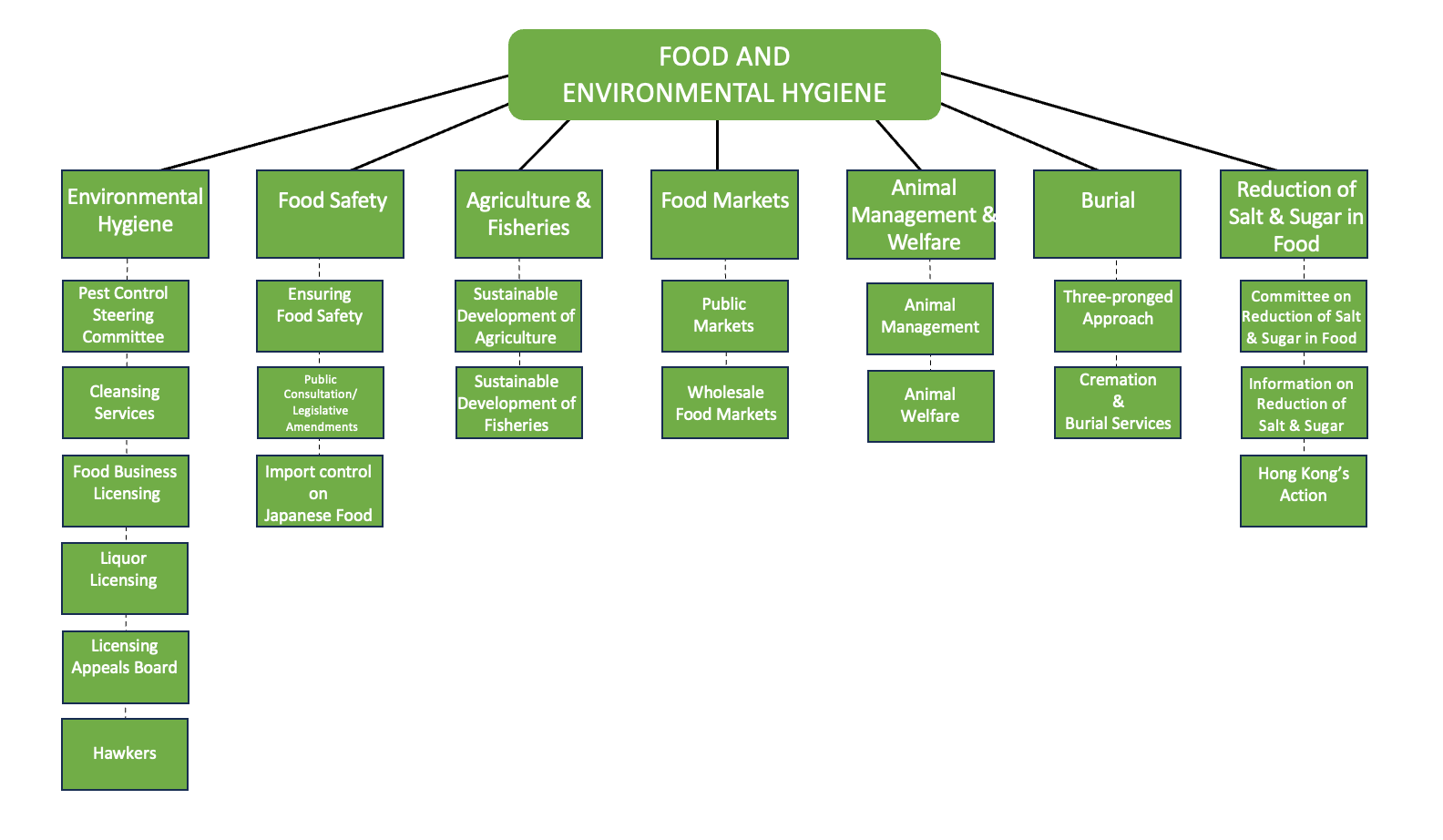

The Environment and Ecology Bureau is split into two separate domains, the Environment, and the Food and Environmental Hygiene.

As shown in figure 1, the environment and ecology bureau is further split into 5 separate domains including environmental protection, Energy, Climate Change, Conservation, and Sustainable Development.

As shown in figure 2, the Food and Environmental Hygiene department is further split into 7 separate domains including, Environmental Hygiene, Food Safety, Agriculture and Fisheries, Food Markets, Animal Management and Welfare, Burial, and Reduction of Salt and Sugar in Food.

== Mission and Vision ==
The Environmental and Ecology Bureau’s (EEB) mission is to increase the quality of life experienced by Hong Kong residents by addressing environmental and social issues. They strive to create a society where the community values the preservation of a healthy and pleasant environment for present and future generations. As well as this, they aim to create a community that prioritizes the maintenance of a dependable and sustainable energy supply at an affordable rate, while attempting to enhance energy efficiency, promoting the conservation of energy, and minimizing detrimental environmental impacts.

They attempt to achieve this through the formulation of policies regarding environmental protection and nature conservation. They are accountable for upholding environmental laws, overseeing the monitoring of environmental quality, and ensuring the existence of waste management facilities for different waste categories. Additionally, they provide guidance on the environmental impact of urban planning and new policies, address pollution complaints and incidents, and foster community awareness and support for environmental initiatives. In response to the ever-increasing environmental issues, the EEB has introduced several comprehensive frameworks, such as Hong Kong’s Climate Action Plan 2050, Waste Blueprint in Hong Kong 2035, Hong Kong Roadmap on Popularisation of Electric Vehicles, and the Clean Air Plan for Hong Kong 2035.

== Responsibilities ==
=== Environmental Protection ===
Following the reorganization (January 1, 2023) of the government’s structure, duties that were once held by the Environment and Ecology Bureau (EEB) and the Environmental Protection Department (EPD) were redistributed. Duties held by the EPD are focused on policy formulation, and execution of duties, this action was made to strengthen HK’s climate change actions, as well as reduction of waste and increased environmental sustainability. After the reorganization, the Environment Branch continues to be headed by the Permanent Secretary for Environment and Ecology.

The EPD’s duties are distributed among the following six program domains, which are as follows:

- Air Programme - Primarily focused on air quality and air pollution control in HK focusing heavily on the reduction of emissions within the city.
- Environmental Assessment and Planning Programme - HK has a transparent environmental impact assessment (EIA) system which is intended to identify potential impacts of a project in its early stages, as well as creating alternatives or mitigation methods if needed.
- Noise Programme - addresses the problem of noise pollution primarily caused by traffic, construction, and neighborhood noise. The EPD addresses this issue through the use of control measures such as quieter construction methods, noise barriers & enclosures, and information campaigns aimed to promote residents being considerate to their neighbors.
- Waste Programme - The EPD records statistics on different waste types including handling requirements, composition, and quantity disposed/recycled. Through the waste programme the EPD conserves landfill space, as well as planning to develop Integrated Waste Management Facilities, and Organic Resources Recovery Centres. The EPD also promotes waste reduction and has developed an EcoPark to promote local recycling.
- Water Programme - The EPD has created an interactive map to locate water quality conditions and marine ecosystems and habitats in HK. The EPD works to control waste water discharges, providing sewers, collecting and treating sewage.

=== Conservation ===
The Environment & Ecology bureau is responsible for a wide purview of conservation efforts in Hong Kong. It focuses most centrally on nature and countryside conservation in its work, but also involves itself in the protection of endangered species as well as the conservation of local biodiversity.

A large aspect of the Environment & Ecology bureau's conservation work is its supervision of the New Nature Conservation Policy. This piece of legislation, implemented in 2004, was enacted with the purpose of regulating, protecting, and managing Hong Kong’s biodiversity and natural environment holistically.

Under this policy, 12 different ecologically important sites across Hong Kong, the majority of which fall under private ownership, have been identified for governmental protection. This policy also introduced two different schemes: the Nature Conservation Management Agreement Scheme and the Public Private Partnership Scheme, to enhance the conservation of these sites.

Additionally, the EEB is responsible for the allocation of public land to natural conservation. Currently, it has allocated 24 country parks and 22 special areas, totaling around 44,300 hectares, to nature preservation, recreation, and education. In marine territory, the EEB has also enumerated 5 marine parks and 1 marine reserve, for a total sea area of 3400 hectares, for protection.

In countryside conservation, the EEB oversees the preservation of remote, countryside areas, and in turn, the natural ecology and cultural infrastructure of such regions. To supplement their endeavors in this regard, the bureau also works with the specialized Countryside Conservation Office, which was announced to the public during the Chief Executive's 2017 Policy Address and established shortly thereafter, in July 2018. The two entities currently have a total earmarked sum of $1 billion HKD of government money pledged for their conservation initiatives, under a program titled the Countryside Conservation Funding Scheme. As the EEB website states, half of this sum “will be deployed to provide financial support to local non-profit-making organizations (NPOs) and villagers through the Countryside Conservation Funding Scheme (CCFS) for organising diverse and innovative conservation activities or projects in the countryside (except Lantau Island) based on an interactive and cooperative approach.”.

Lastly, the Environment and Ecology bureau also oversees the conservation of endangered species and biodiversity. To the former, this bureau enforces adherence to the Convention on International Trade in Endangered Species of Wild Fauna and Flora (CITES). This legislative article draws from the internationally-established CITES standards and localizes proposed legislative standards to Hong Kong’s landscape of biodiversity. It is frequently updated, with its most recent refinement made of January, 2023.

To the latter, the EEB manages the city-level Biodiversity Strategy and Action Plan, which guides Hong Kong’s agenda for biodiversity conservation on both a cohesive and local level with reference to the standards of international biodiversity conservation goals, delineated by the Convention of Biological Diversity.

=== Climate Change ===
In light of Xi Jinping’s announcement, setting China on the path to carbon neutrality by 2060, the Government in Hong Kong responded by announcing its ambitious intention for the region to attain carbon neutrality before 2050. They have adopted four core strategies to this end: “net-zero electricity generation", "energy saving and green buildings", "green transport" and "waste reduction”. Taking the lead on the road to carbon neutrality, the Environment branch of the Bureau is implementing and coordinating numerous Government policies and initiatives. These have been subjected to frequent reviews to ensure their effectiveness. Support has also been provided to the Steering Committee on Climate Change and Carbon Neutrality, as well as to the Green Tech Fund, supporting their research and development of new energy and decarbonisation technologies.

The Government has curated multiple Carbon Neutrality Partnerships with businesses in both the private and public sectors. These see the Government encouraging these businesses to expedite and deepen their pursuit for low-carbon transformation. The Government hopes that through this an example will be set to other parts of society, as well as boosting the green economy, and creating more jobs centred around sustainability.

A large focus has been put on bettering the education in schools and tertiary institutions with respect to climate change. In schools, both teachers and students are having their understanding of climate change and sustainable development enhanced, in the hope that this will help promote a low carbon lifestyle. Where relevant, universities are being encouraged by the Government to adopt more sophisticated content on climate change, low carbon technologies, green finance, sustainable development, and green transport. Here, the hope is to nurture talents for the green industry and facilitate more complex sustainable development.

=== Sustainable Development ===
The Environment and Ecology Bureau is responsible for the formulation and implementation of environmental policies in Hong Kong. This includes developing strategies and plans for sustainable development, enforcing environmental protection laws, and evaluating policies related to environmental issues.

The Environment and Ecology Bureau is also dedicated to the conservation of Hong Kong's natural environment and ecosystems. This includes managing nature reserves, conserving biodiversity, protecting marine areas, and forest management.

Additionally, the Environment and Ecology Bureau is committed to promoting sustainable resource utilization and waste management. This involves the development of renewable energy, promoting waste recycling, and managing waste disposal facilities.

==== Specific initiatives ====
1. Promotion of green buildings: The Environment and Ecology Bureau works towards the dissemination and promotion of green buildings. This includes establishing green building standards, introducing green building certification systems, and organizing awareness campaigns for green buildings.
2. Improvement of energy efficiency: The Environment and Ecology Bureau carries out initiatives to enhance energy efficiency. This entails formulating policies aimed at improving energy efficiency, providing subsidies to support energy efficiency improvements, and conducting awareness activities related to energy efficiency.
3. Water resource management: The Environment and Ecology Bureau focuses on the sustainable management of water resources. This includes formulating policies to promote efficient water use, implementing efforts for water conservation and regeneration, and conducting awareness campaigns on water resources.
4. Environmental education and awareness: The Environment and Ecology Bureau undertakes efforts in environmental education and in raising awareness. This includes implementing environmental education programs in schools and communities, providing information on environmental matters, and conducting awareness campaigns on environmental protection.

Through these responsibilities and initiatives, the Environment and Ecology Bureau assumes responsibility for sustainable development in Hong Kong.

=== Energy ===
Hong Kong does not have any energy resources in its land, and energy suppliers are two private companies, the CLP Power Hong Kong Limited, and the Hong Kong Electric Company Limited. CLP Power Hong Kong Limited is in a CLP group, which runs energy business in Hong Kong, Mainland of China, Australia, India, Taiwan, and Thailand, and the company covers the Kowloon, New Territories, and other small islands. On the other hand, Hong Kong Electric Company Limited only focuses on Hong Kong and covers Hong Kong island and Lamma island. Having these two companies as energy suppliers, the Environment and Ecology Bureau has two policy objectives; to ensure that the energy needs of the community are met safely, reliably, efficiently and at reasonable prices, and to minimize the environmental impact of energy production and use and promote the efficient use and conservation of energy. To achieve these two objectives, the Bureau has two approaches these days. The first approach is energy efficiency and conservation policy. The second approach is promotion and development of renewable energy.

== Leadership / Appointment ==
=== Leadership ===
Mr. Tse Chin Wan is the Secretary of the Environment and Ecology Bureau of the Hong Kong Government, appointed on July 1, 2022. He joined the Environmental Protection Agency (now the Environmental Protection Department) in Hong Kong in 1985 and has since held various professional and senior management positions. In 2013, he was appointed Deputy Chief Executive of the Environmental Protection Agency, and in August 2017, he was appointed Deputy Secretary of the Department of the Environment. Mr. Tse Tsin has extensive experience in various areas of environmental protection, including law enforcement, computer modelling, environmental impact assessment, and cross-border cooperation with mainland China. During his tenure as Undersecretary of the Ministry of Environment, he spearheaded policy formulation in air quality, waste management, climate action, and protection.

=== Appointment ===
The Secretary of the Environment and Ecology Bureau in Hong Kong is appointed by the Hong Kong Government. The detailed process regarding the appointment process is not known, but since Mr.Tse Tsin, the current secretary, joined the Environmental Protection Agency (now the Environmental Protection Department) in Hong Kong in 1985 and has since held various professional and senior management positions, it is very important in the appointment that the candidate has experience in environmental protection and conservation work.

== Controversy ==
Environmental impact assessments exemption size increased from 20 to 50 hectares as well as time needed for assessments cut by half. These proposed amendments would see more than half of projects underway could skip the evaluation process. Secretary for Environment and Ecology Tse Chin-wan says that these measures will improve the environmental impact assessment mechanism by optimizing procedures, improving efficiency, focus on environmental performance, and effectively balance the priorities of environmental protection and development in Hong Kong. These plans have been met with criticism by Friends of the Earth Hong Kong warning that increasing the development size limit would “severely compromise” the purpose of the environmental impact assessment.

Hong Kong’s environmental chief said that the bureau should be reorganized. This was because the Environment Branch of the bureau and the Environmental Protection Department were merged as one organization at that time. Since what the bureau should do has become more complex recently, it was better for the bureau to be subdivided. The chief believed that the reorganization could allow the bureau to deal with complex problems such as climate change and waste reduction.

As for food waste, 2023’s policy is trying to do the same programme as the previous year, which installs food waste smart bins in public housing estates. However, the programme is not enough because it does not include private housing, in which 53.7% of Hong Kong people lived in 2021. Also, the bureau should give subsidies for the operation of the programme, so that more residential residents can take part in it.

As for climate change, the bureau focuses on geotechnical solutions and meteorological monitoring. However, they are just addressing the symptoms of climate change. Therefore, the bureau should approach the root causes of climate change.
