= Hong Kong–Namibia relations =

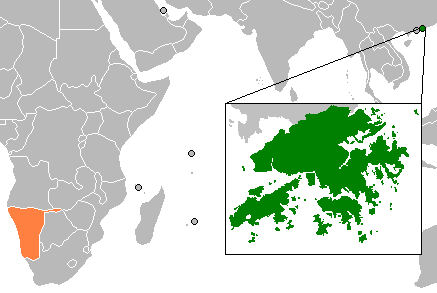
- Hong Kong: Namibia

Hong Kong–Namibia relations refers to the international relations between Hong Kong and Namibia.

The Consulate of the Republic of Namibia in Hong Kong is the official representation of Namibia in Hong Kong. The Consulate simultaneously operates for both Hong Kong and Macao, which is located in the vicinity of Hong Kong. Citizens from Hong Kong are exempted from visa requirements for tourists entering Namibia.

== Cooperation and disputes ==
Both economies are members of the International Monetary Fund and World Trade Organization. Hong Kong is Namibia's 5th largest import origin and export destination in Asia, with diamonds and copper as Namibian major exports. Namibia is under the ‘List of Countries/Territories under Regional Cooperation Division’ of the Hong Kong Trade and Industry Department, as part of Hong Kong's strategic commercial scheme of Bilateral Commercial Relations with Asia (except the Mainland), Africa and Oceania.

The Husab Mine is under development led by a Hong Kong company near the town of Swakopmund in the Erongo region of western-central Namibia. It is the second largest uranium mine in the world and the most massive nuclear-related projects in Africa. The mining license is held by Taurus Minerals Limited of Hong Kong since April 2012. The development is viewed by some as an extent of a new form of colonialism monitored by the People's Republic of China behind the scene.

Trade disputes often occur between the two economies, especially in food and animal products. In the early 2010s, disputes between restrictions on beef trade have been under the spot light. Meat import of Hong Kong is regulated under the ‘Imported Game, Meat and Poultry Regulations’ with stringent requirements. In 2013, Namibian government posed an official application to the Food and Environmental Hygiene Department to export meat to Hong Kong. While initially Hong Kong authority believes there are technical difficulties involved in inspecting the hygiene conditions of farms on other continent, Hong Kong officers eventually visited Namibia to assess the condition of farms in Namibia. The trade finally initiated in 2016, as Namibia had sent their first consignment to Hong Kong, and became the first African country to export beef to Hong Kong. The export to Hong Kong was viewed by the Namibia Agricultural Union representative as a major step to achieve market diversification to generate demand for high-end agricultural products instead of relying on demand for lower-value products sold to South Africa. Hong Kong was a very important market for Namibian produced oyster, only after South Africa. In 2014, Hong Kong stopped oyster imports from Namibia as high levels of cadmium were detected in oyster samples. Hong Kong's Centre for Food Safety officially notified the Namibian authorities of the test results and its decision to ban all oyster imports from Namibia. The ban should not be released if Namibian samples continue to fail the standard.

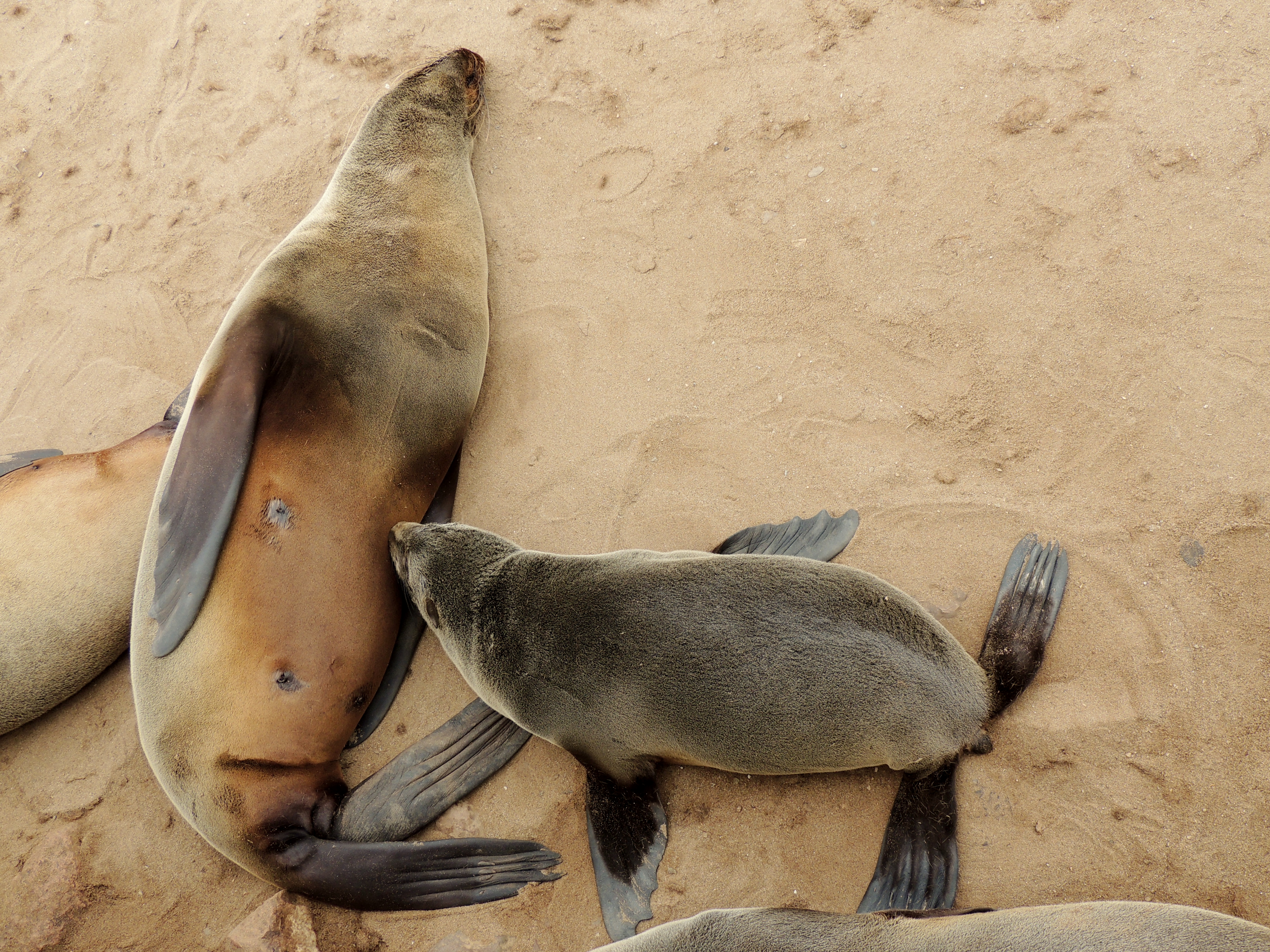
Cape fur seal

Trade between Hong Kong and Namibia has occasionally raised disputes related to environmental concerns in Namibia. In 2017, a Namibian plan to export donkey products to Hong Kong, Vietnam, and China has resulted in controversy. While abattoirs were planned at Outjo and Okahandja, concerns were raised on whether if the project would endanger the donkey population as well create water shortage. A council meeting of the Outjo Municipality in northern Namibia was convened in May 2017 to debate on awarding land to develop a donkey abattoir. Outjo community committee chairperson Lindie Prinsloo opted that the council had ignored written objections and deceived the community members from attending relevant meeting. According to Namibian Councillor Johannes Hindjou, establishing a donkey abattoir in Okahandja should be allowed only if the right procedures are followed. Another issue has been Rhino horn smuggling. Rhino horn trade in Hong Kong is one of the reasons of the decrease of population of Namibian Rhino. For example, 3 smugglers attempting to smuggle 14 rhino horns were arrested in Namibia in 2013, a Hong Kong-bound Chinese man was arrested with 18 rhino horns in November 2016. The smuggling activities have raised concern by environmental pressure groups. Namibian cap fur seal trade is concerned by western media though Namibia still allows annual seal hunt. Seal genitalia is Namibia's major exporter-reported goods with Hong Kong as the top importer, occupying 4360 of the 5450 pounds produced. The great demand occurs as dried, liquefied, or powdered penises are believed to be performance enhancing in traditional oriental medicine.

While Hong Kong and Namibia both situated on the Belt and Road region, Hong Kong government has initiated a Belt and Road scholarship for students in the Belt and Road region, which includes Namibia, to apply for free higher educational opportunities in Hong Kong. Initially, the proposal resulted in a negative response in Hong Kong society as it was widely believed to be a wastage of Hong Kong's tax revenue to flatter a strategy proposed by the Chinese government. In response to the criticism, the Hong Kong government later suggested that the scholarship should also be opened to Hong Kong citizens who plan to study the Belt and Road countries, including Namibia.

== High level visit ==
Minister of Trade and Industry of Namibia Calle Schlettwein visited Hong Kong in 2014. One of the major aims of this trip was to call for in-principle support for export of Namibian beef to Hong Kong.
