= Taiwanese tofu and dried bean curd scandal =

2014 food safety crisis in Taiwan

In December 2014, a food safety crisis erupted in Taiwan, when tofu, tofu skin, and fried tofu, among other soy products, were found to contain the carcinogenic substance methyl yellow. The issue later extended to affect certain noodle soup oil packets. On January 30, 2015, tests revealed the presence of methyl yellow residues in "Five-Spice Dried Bean Curd" from Dechang Foods and "Wood Dried Tofu" from Huixiang Foods.

== Background ==
In December 1987, soy products from Daxi, Taoyuan experienced a series of contamination incidents, with contaminants such as preservatives, bleaching agents, aflatoxin, and methyl yellow. The affected products were pulled from shelves and destroyed. In response, the government amended regulations to ban the use of methyl yellow and offered food coloring (No. 4 and No. 5) as a replacement following extensive research.

On June 7, 2013, Taiwanese authorities discovered the industrial dye methyl yellow in tofu used for traditional offerings sold by the century-old Yu Xie Feng Tofu Factory. It was later discovered that the Ximending-based Yi Liang Food Company was selling industrial dye methyl yellow as a substitute for food-grade colorants. Yi Liang Foods had supplied this adulterated dye to Yu Xie Feng Tofu Factory, and also to several noodles manufacturers. Shipments of the adulterated tofu dye were sent out in 2006, 2010, and again in July and August 2012.

Lin Chieh-liang, the Director of the Clinical Toxicology Department at Linkou Chang Gung Memorial Hospital, pointed out that methyl yellow is an industrial dye. Excessive consumption of methyl yellow can cause liver damage, and long-term consumption will increase the risk of liver cancer. While the adulterated dye might appear similar to those made with legal food-grade colorants (yellow No. 4 and No. 5), it has a distinctive, pungent odor.

== Incident ==
On December 6, 2014, Hong Kong media reported that the well-known "Dechang Dried Bean Curd" from Taichung was found to contain the dye methyl yellow in its "Black Pepper Dried Bean Curd" by the Hong Kong Food and Environmental Hygiene Department's Centre for Food Safety. Dechang Foods reported the issue to health authorities, and on December 7, Taichung City Government's Health Bureau conducted an inspection of the Dechang Foods factory. As a precautionary measure, the affected products were pulled from the shelves in Hong Kong and Taiwan.

== Investigation ==
On December 16, 2014, following an in-depth investigation by health authorities, it was revealed that the bean curd skin used by Dechang Foods was purchased from Jiuyuan Enterprise in Changhua County. Furthermore, the emulsifier used to make Jiuyuan Enterprise's bean curd skin was sourced from Qianxin Industrial Co. in Anping District, Tainan. The two owners of Qianxin Industrial Co. were subsequently arrested.

Further inspection found that other products, such as "Pinxiang Shijia" from Yunlin County's Huang Damu Food Company, "Daxi Tofu" from Baohong Enterprises in New Taipei City, and "Yuxiang Tofu" from Yuxiang Foods in Changhua County (which also used Jiuyuan's bean curd skin), were also found to contain methyl yellow. Other companies, however, had no such findings and their products passed the safety checks.

Qianxin Industrial Co. had purchased the yellow powder from Rongmei Chemical Co. in Tainan City, which it added to produce its emulsifier. The product was distributed to 11 wholesalers across six counties and cities, with two wholesalers already suspended operations. According to the Director-General of the Food and Drug Administration (FDA), Jiang Yumei, Qianxin Industrial Co. had falsified registration, falsified information, and adding unauthorized additives. Under the Food Safety and Sanitation Management Act, the penalties for the former two violations range from $30,000 to $3 million NTD, and for the illegal addition of substances, the penalties range from $60,000 to $50 million NTD, or up to five years of imprisonment with fines up to $8 million NTD.

As of December 17, the FDA reported that Qianxin had shipped at least 25,760 kg of the tofu emulsifier since January 2012. Prosecutors noted that Qianxin's 71-year-old owner, Lu Tianrong, had been selling this emulsifier formula for over 10 years. The Food and Drug Administration further confirmed that by 10 a.m. on the 17th, a total of 36 affected products had been identified.

On the same day, Taichung City Government's Health Bureau reported that several well-known companies in the city, such as Taizhenxiang Foods, Sanjiaxin (Wanyi Dried Bean Curd), Weixin Foods, and Yipinxiang Foods, were also affected. That evening, Miaoli County Government's Health Bureau reported that five vendors in tourist spots and rest stations in Miaoli, Gongguan, Nanzhuang, Tongxiao, and Yuanli had sold tofu products containing methyl yellow. Three of the vendors already sold all 9,000 kg of the affected products, the remaining two vendors had returned 801 kg of their unsold stock.

In December 18, Taiwan Apple Daily reported that tofu, bean curd, and fried tofu products made using Qianxin's emulsifier had already entered traditional markets for sale. Taipei City Government's Health Bureau investigated a downstream vendor of Yuxiang Foods in Changhua County, and discovered they had already shipped products to Canada, however customs information were still being verified.

On the same day, the FDA reported that 23 downstream manufacturers and 73 types of tofu products had been affected. The Changhua County Government's Health Bureau also investigated two companies in their county, Zhonglian Foods Co. and Heizhuyuan Chicken Feet Specialty Store, which had purchased dried bean curd in bulk from Yuxiang Foods in 2014. These products had been pulled from shelves and recovered.

Additionally, Changhua County Government's Health Bureau inspected Yuxiang Foods Co., Ltd. and discovered that Wei Li Foods Industrial Co., Ltd. had purchased fried bean curds from Yuxiang that were suspected to contain methyl yellow. These fried bean curds had been used in the production of oil packets for instant noodles, such as those used in zhajiangmian products.

On December 19, the FDA reported that the number of affected downstream manufacturers increased to 24, with 115 types of tofu products now involved. However, the Hsinchu County Government's Health Bureau confirmed that three products from Liyi Foods, including Zhiwei Daxi Tofu, were excluded from the list. Additionally, the Taichung City Government's Health Bureau clarified that a mistake had been made regarding products from Riyu Dehang (registered under Hedasheng Co.), which the products were found to be semi-fried bean curd skin, not fried tofu.

On December 25, the FDA released the results of further testing, revealing that Qianxin’s emulsifier contained another industrial dye, diethyl yellow, which has a chemical structure similar to dimethyl yellow. Diethyl yellow has similar toxicity and is typically used for coloring plastics, inks, and other industrial products.

== Motivation ==
The Taiwan Apple Daily reported that the legitimate yellow food coloring sold by chemical companies costs NT$120 per 25 grams (equivalent to NT$4.8 per gram), while dimethyl yellow costs NT$120 per 30 grams (equivalent to NT$4 per gram). Chenyau Kuan, an assistant professor at Chaoyang University of Technology, explained that while edible food coloring is water-soluble and fades easily, methyl yellow is oil-soluble, making it ideal for coloring various food products. Methyl yellow is much more cost-effective, as only 1% of the amount needed for edible food coloring is required to achieve the same color.

== Inspection ==
On January 29, 2015, the Taipei City Government's Health Bureau announced the results of a random inspection conducted from December 22 to 25, 2014. They tested 49 samples of tofu products from supermarkets, markets, and food stores, of which 10 tested positive for methyl yellow. The sources of the contaminated products were traced to several companies: Yuxiang Foods Co., Ltd. (5 samples), Tiensu Foods Co., Ltd. (3 samples), Maijun Foods Co., Ltd. (1 sample), and New East Sun Co., Ltd. (1 sample).

Additionally, on December 31, 2014, the Taipei City Government's Health Bureau also conducted random testing on tofu products and pickled vegetables. Among 20 samples tested, 1 bean curd and 1 tofu product tested positive for methyl yellow, both of which originated from Taoyuan City. These products were referred to Taoyuan City Government's Health Bureau for further investigation and penalties.

== Commentary ==
In issue 940 of Business Today, several points were raised regarding the food safety warning in Taiwan:

1. Selective Inspection: Legislator Tien Chiu-chin stated, "This is similar to how people who want to speed are aware of where speed traps are on the highway. Those who want to break the rules will always choose areas that are less frequently checked."
2. Ignoring the Long-standing Problem of Toxins: Ye Yanbo, Director of the Changhua County Health Bureau, commented, "Methyl yellow, also known as 'butter yellow', has been used since the Japanese colonial era to dye other foods..." The Hong Kong Centre for Food Safety also pointed out that since it has been used to dye other foods, inspections should take a broader approach and consider all potential risks.
3. Active Registration System Only for Single-Ingredient Additives: Taiwan's current food additive registration system only requires inspection before registration for single-ingredient additives. For compound additives, businesses are only required to self-register without any inspection, allowing them to be sold without verification.

== Court ruling ==
On July 30, 2015, the Changhua District Court in Taiwan sentenced the owners of Qianxin Industrial Co., Ltd., Lu Tianrong and his son Lu Jiaxian, to prison terms of 7 and 9 years respectively. Each was also fined NT$15 million, and their illicit earnings of NT$25.2 million were confiscated.

Lu Tianrong and Lu Jiaxian both appealed their initial sentences, which then Taiwan High Court Taichung Branch Court reduced Lu Tianrong's sentence to 3 years and a NT$3 million fine, and Lu Jiaxian's sentence to 4 years and a NT$6 million fine. They both appealed their sentences again, but were rejected by the Supreme Court.
