= Fanling Environmental Resource Centre =

Coordinates: 22.4994°N 114.1445°E

Fanling Environmental Resource Centre (Chinese: 粉嶺環境資源中心 or 環保天地) was a resource center under the management of the Environmental Protection Department of the Government of Hong Kong. It was located in Wo Mun Street, Luen Wo Hui, Fanling, New Territories, Hong Kong.

This was the third Environmental Resource Centre managed by the Environmental Protection Department. It was also the biggest of the three Centres.

There was an exhibition hall, a library, a conference room and a lecture room in the Resource Centre.

Fanling Environmental Resource Centre was closed in 2020.

== Exhibition Hall ==
There were eight display zones in the exhibition.

- Clean Air for You and Me
- World of Silence
- Reduce Waste, Start from Me
- Protect Our Water Resources
- Environmental Planning & Assessment
- Community Education Interactive Station
- Enforcement
- Global Environmental Issues

The above display zones were to exhibit the problems and the solution of various kinds of pollutions.

== See also ==
- Wan Chai Environmental Resource Centre
- Tsuen Wan Environmental Resource Centre
