= Environment Bureau =

- 環境局
- Emblem of the Hong Kong SAR

Agency overview
- Formed: 2007
- Preceding agency: Environment, Transport and Works Bureau
- Dissolved: 2022
- Superseding agency: Environment and Ecology Bureau
- Headquarters: 15/F & 16/F, East Wing, Central Government Offices, 2 Tim Mei Avenue, Tamar, Hong Kong
- Minister responsible: Wong Kam-sing, Secretary for the Environment
- Deputy Minister responsible: Tse Chin-wan, Under Secretary for the Environment
- Agency executive: Maisie Cheng, Permanent Secretary for the Environment/Director of Environmental Protection
- Child agency: Environmental Protection Department
- Website: www.enb.gov.hk

Environment Bureau
- Traditional Chinese: 環境局
Transcriptions
Yue: Cantonese
- Yale Romanization: Wàahn gíng guhk
- Jyutping: Waan4 ging2 guk6

The Environment Bureau (ENB; Chinese: 環境局) is a defunct policy bureau of the Government of Hong Kong in operation from 2007 to 2022. It was responsible for developing policies in environmental protection, energy, climate change, sustainable development, nature conservation; enforcing environmental legislation. This also includes monitoring environmental quality, energy efficiency, waste management, renewable energy development, regulatory oversight of the electricity sector in Hong Kong The bureau was managed by the Secretary for the Environment.

As part of the government bureaux restructuring on 1 July 2022, the bureau was replaced by the enlarged Environment and Ecology Bureau, which took over all policy portfolios under the former Environment Bureau.

== Subordinate departments ==
The following public entities are managed by the bureau:

- Environmental Protection Department
- Energy and Sustainable Development Branch

== See also ==
- Hong Kong Disciplined Services
