= Regional Services Department =

Former Hong Kong government department

- 區域市政總署
- Logo of the Regional Council, the parent agency of the Regional Services Department

Municipal agency overview
- Formed: 1 April 1986
- Dissolved: 31 December 1999
- Superseding agencies: Food and Environmental Hygiene Department; Leisure and Cultural Services Department
- Jurisdiction: New Territories, Hong Kong
- Website: www.info.gov.hk/rsd/english/rsdhome.htm

Regional Services Department
- Traditional Chinese: 區域市政總署
Transcriptions
Yue: Cantonese
- Yale Romanization: Kēui wihk síh jing júng chyúh
- Jyutping: Keoi^{1} wik^{6} si^{5} zing^{3} zung^{2} cyu^{5}

Regional Services Department (Chinese: 區域市政總署) was a government department in Hong Kong, under the Broadcasting, Culture and Sport Branch. It carried out the policies and managed the facilities of the former Regional Council. After being abolished with the Regional Council in 1999, its functions were inherited by the Food and Environmental Hygiene Department and the Leisure and Cultural Services Department.

== See also ==
- Food and Environmental Hygiene Department
- Leisure and Cultural Services Department
- Urban Council
- Urban Services Department
