= Wong Kam-sing =

Hong Kong former Secretary for the Environment

Wong Kam-sing GBS JP
- 黃錦星
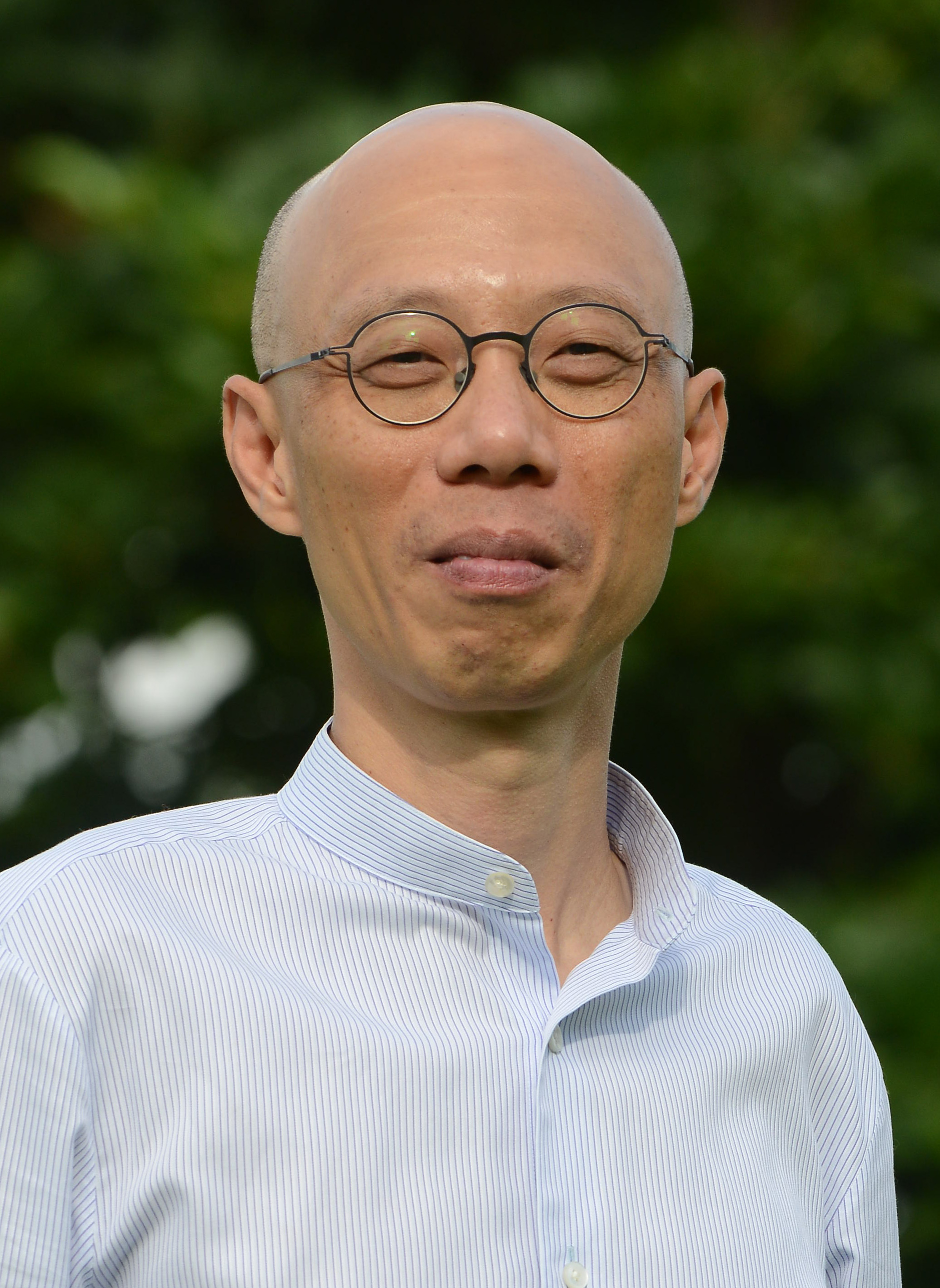

2nd Secretary for the Environment
- In office 1 July 2012 – 30 June 2022
- Chief Executive: Leung Chun-ying; Carrie Lam Cheng Yuet-ngor
- Preceded by: Edward Yau Tang-wah
- Succeeded by: Tse Chin-wan (as Secretary for the Environment and Ecology)

Personal details
- Born: 1963 (age 62–63)
- Spouse: Susan Leung So-wan
- Education: Po Leung Kuk No.1 W.H. Cheung College

Wong Kam-sing, GBS, JP (Chinese: 黃錦星, born in 1963), is a Hong Kong architect and the former Secretary for the Environment, Wong had held a number of public service positions before joining the Government, including the first Chairman of the Environment and Sustainable Development Committee of the Hong Kong Institute of Architects, the Chairman of the Professional Green Building Council and the Vice Chairman of the Hong Kong Green Building Council. He has contributed to the promotion and research of the standards and guidelines for sustainable built environment applicable to the high-density urban environment of Hong Kong.

== Background ==
Wong lived in a subdivided flat in a tenement building in Sham Shui Po, Kowloon in his early years. He later moved to Shatin Pass Estate during kindergarten. Wong has five siblings. In his spare time, he worked as a tutor, made artificial flowers, and worked in factories during summer vacations to help support his family.

== Career ==
During his tenure as the Secretary for the Environment, Wong has introduced a number of policy blueprints to establish the direction, targets and roadmaps for policies on air quality, waste reduction and recycling, nature conservation, climate change and energy. He announced the Hong Kong Environmental Report 2012-2022 in June 2022 and used six “I” to illustrate the environmental policies and measures during the past ten years from 2012 to 2022: interaction, innovation, integration, improvement, investment, infrastructure.

The blueprints include:

- March 2013, "A Clean Air Plan for Hong Kong";
- May 2013, "Hong Kong Blueprint for Sustainable Use of Resources 2013–2022";
- February 2014, "A Food Waste & Yard Waste Plan for Hong Kong 2014–2022";
- May 2015, "Energy Saving Plan for Hong Kong’s Built Environment 2015–2025+";
- November 2015, “Hong Kong Climate Change Report 2015”;
- December 2016, "Hong Kong Biodiversity Strategy and Action Plan 2016–2021";
- January 2017, "Hong Kong’s Climate Action Plan 2030+".
- June 2017, “Clean Air Plan for Hong Kong 2013–2017 Progress Report”;
- February 2021, “Waste Blueprint for Hong Kong 2035”;
- March 2021, “Hong Kong Roadmap on Popularisation of Electric Vehicles”;
- June 2021, “Clean Air Plan for Hong Kong 2035”;
- October 2021 “Hong Kong’s Climate Action Plan 2050”.

=== Air Quality ===
To improve the air quality, Wong implemented a new set of air quality objectives soon after his assumption of office, and launched the Air Quality Health Index to tie in with the new objectives. From 2010 to 2020, the ambient concentrations of major air pollutants (including respirable suspended particulates, fine suspended particulates, nitrogen dioxide and sulphur dioxide) have dropped by 37% to 58%, and the roadside concentrations of such air pollutants have also dropped by 40% to 50%.

=== Blog ===
In 2017, Wong launched a blog (SEN’s Blog) to brief the public on the latest progress of his policy initiatives with the help of video clips and images. In addition, Wong Kam Sing on Facebook and Wong Kam Sing on Instagram pages have been set up in recent years to strengthen communication with the public.

== Personal life ==
After graduated from CCC Kei Tsz Primary School, Wong studied in St Bonaventure College and High School and Po Leung Kuk CFA No. 1 College (now called Po Leung Kuk No.1 W.H. Cheung College). Wong got his degree from the Faculty of Architecture of the University of Hong Kong in 1988. He then received further education on sustainable built environment from the graduate school of the University of British Columbia in Canada in the 1990s.

== Family ==
Wong’s wife, Susan Leung So-wan, is also an architect. Leung was the Chair of the Board of Local Affairs of the Hong Kong Institute of Architects. They have a daughter.

Political offices
Preceded by Edward Yau	Secretary for the Environment; 2012–2022	Succeeded by Tse Chin-wan (Secretary for Environment and Ecology)
