= Three-nil buildings =

Multiple-occupancy building

Three-nil building is a term used to describe multiple-occupancy buildings in Hong Kong which lack an owners' corporation, residents' organisation and are not managed by a property management company. As of 2019 there were around 5,300 three-nil buildings in Hong Kong. Residents and the government encounter significant issues when dealing with these buildings since these buildings lack points of contact or leadership, leading to maintenance and social issues.
