= Urban Services Department =

Former Hong Kong government department

Urban Services Department (Chinese: 市政總署) was a government department in Hong Kong. It carried out the policies and managed the facilities of the former Urban Council. After being abolished with the Urban Council in 1999, its functions were inherited by the Food and Environmental Hygiene Department and the Leisure and Cultural Services Department.

== See also ==
- Food and Environmental Hygiene Department
- Leisure and Cultural Services Department
- Regional Council, Hong Kong
- Regional Services Department
- Urban Council
