= Old Wan Chai Post Office =

Building in Wan Chai, Hong Kong

Coordinates: 22.27434°N 114.17324°E

- 舊灣仔郵政局
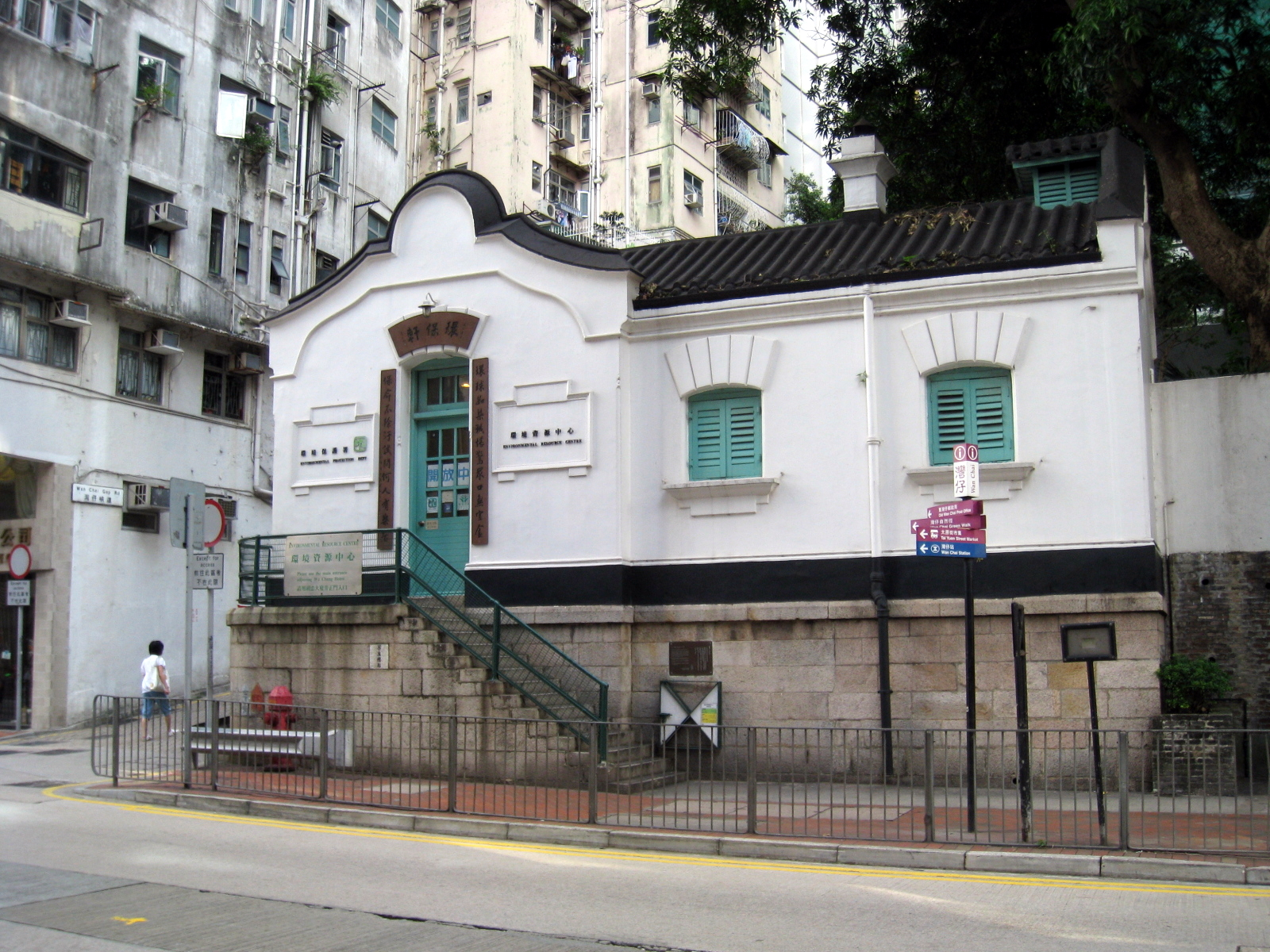
- The building's exterior.
- Former names: Wan Chai Post Office

General information
- Status: Declared monument
- Location: 221 Queen's Road East, Wan Chai, Hong Kong
- Current tenants: Environmental Protection Department
- Estimated completion: 1912/1913
- Opened: 1 March 1915

Old Wan Chai Post Office
- Traditional Chinese: 舊灣仔郵政局
- Simplified Chinese: 旧湾仔邮政局
Transcriptions
Standard Mandarin
- Hanyu Pinyin: Jiù Wān Zǎi Yóuzhèngjú
Yue: Cantonese
- Yale Romanization: Gauh wāan jái yàuh jing guhk
- Jyutping: Gau^{6} waan^{1} zai^{2} jau^{4} zing^{3} guk^{6}

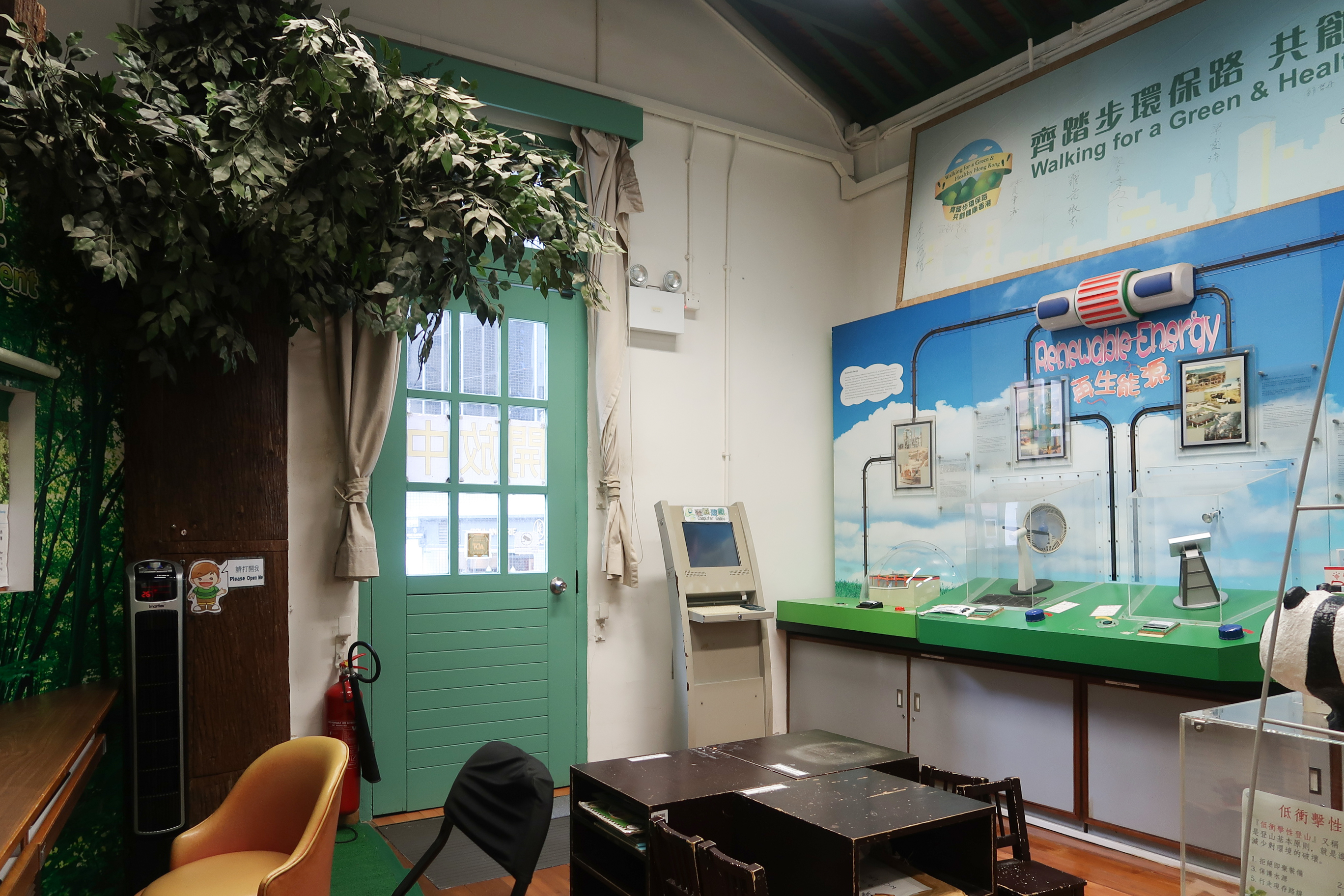
The building's interior

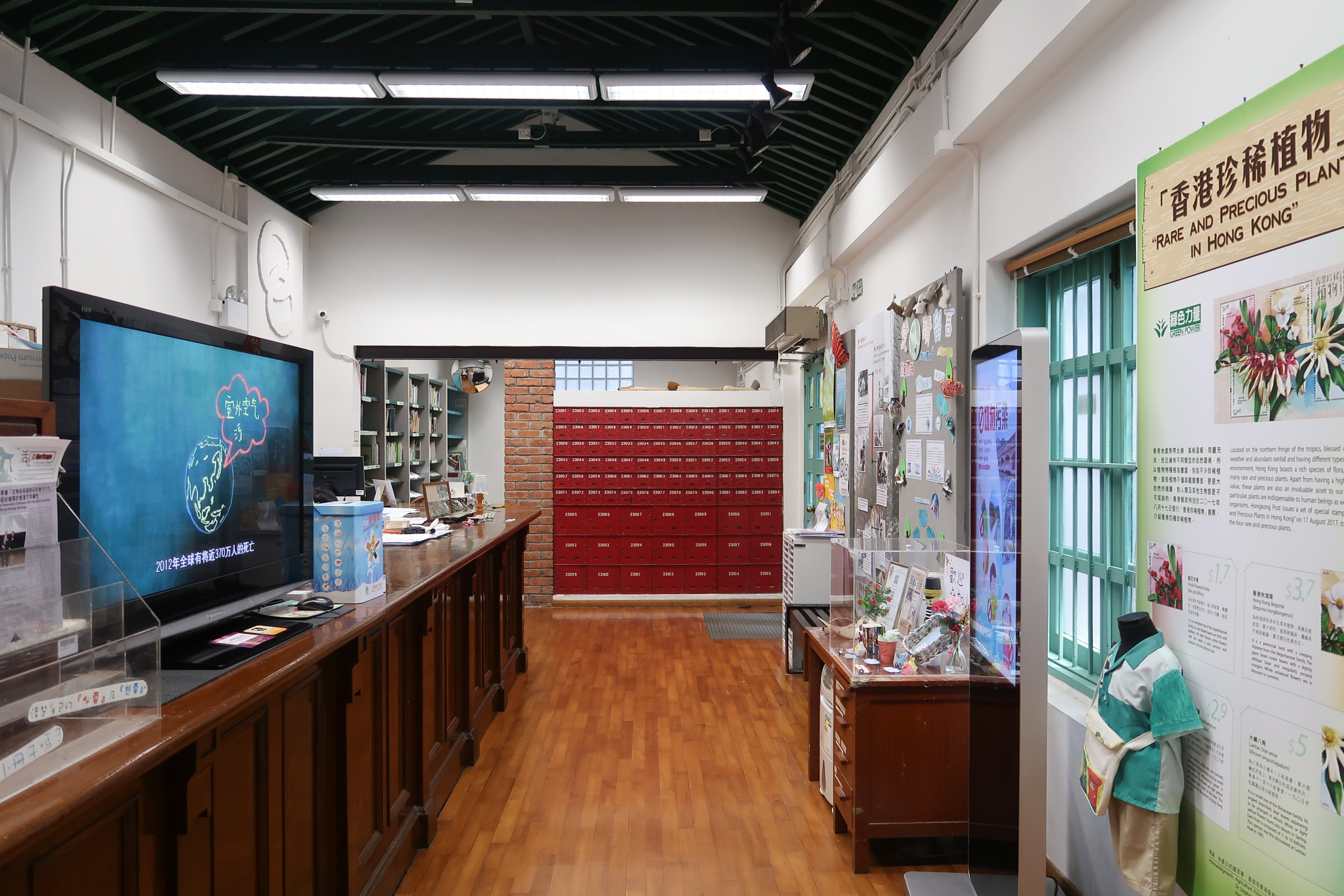
Mailboxes

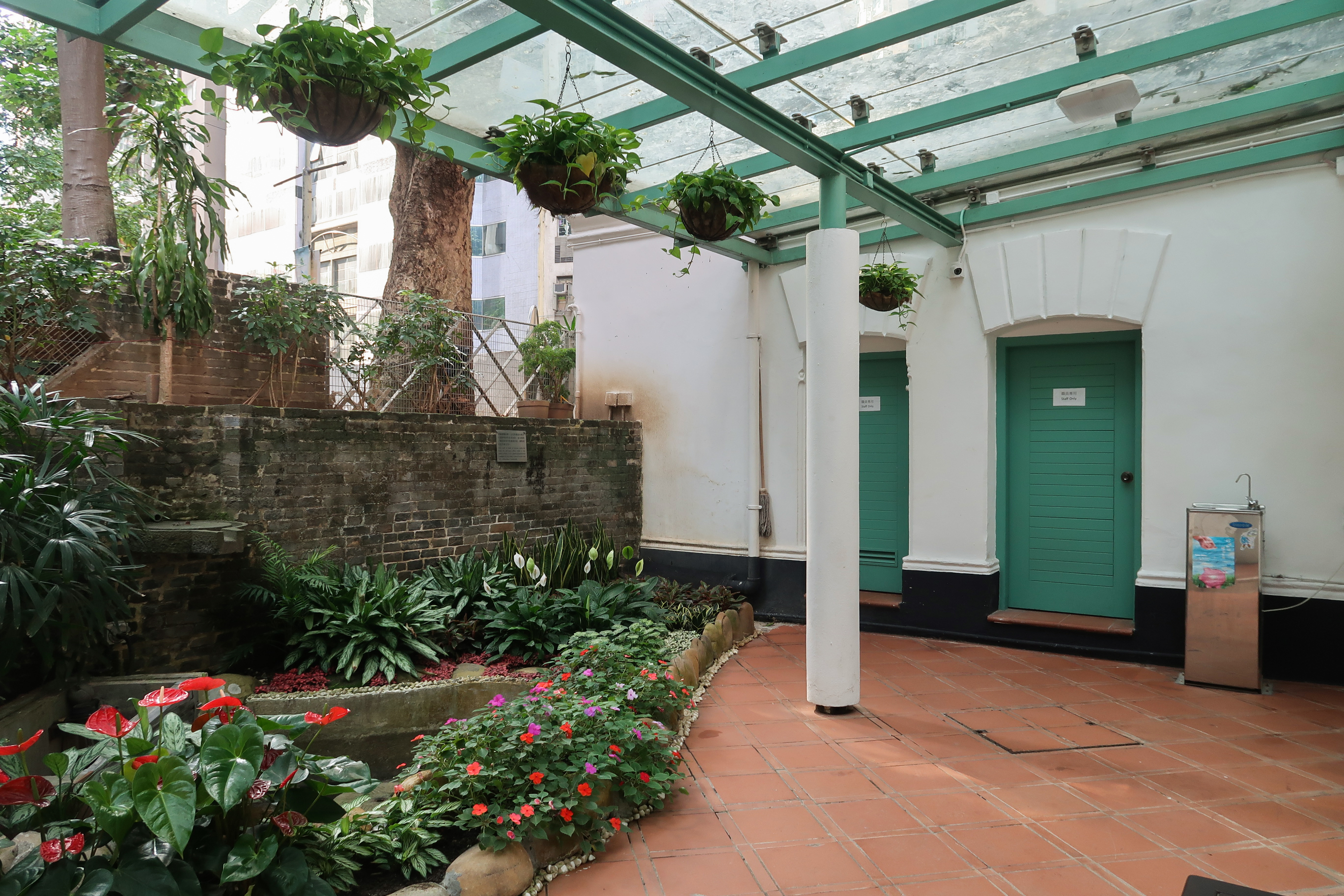
Courtyard

The Old Wan Chai Post Office is the oldest surviving post office building in Hong Kong. It is situated at No. 221 Queen's Road East, at the junction with Wan Chai Gap Road.

== History ==
The building was erected between 1912 and 1913, and opened on 1 March 1915 as the Wan Chai Post Office. It is not known whether the building was originally built and designed for such purpose. The post office ceased to operate in 1992, after having served the Wan Chai community continuously for 77 years.

== Features ==
The Old Wan Chai Post Office is an L-shaped building. It is a simple pitched-roof structure with attractive gable ends and mouldings.

== Environmental Resource Centre ==
The building was operated by the Environmental Protection Department as an Environmental Resource Centre (環保軒) in 1993. From 2024, it has been repurposed as the ‘kNOw Carbon House’ (識「碳」館) to promote carbon neutrality in Hong Kong.

== Conservation ==
The Old Wan Chai Post Office became a declared monument on 18 May 1990. It is the only building declared as a monument in the Wan Chai area.

== See also ==
- Declared monuments of Hong Kong
- List of buildings and structures in Hong Kong
- Wan Chai District
- Wan Chai Heritage Trail
