= Tsuen Wan Environmental Resource Centre =

Museum in Hong Kong

Coordinates: 22.370473°N 114.118149°E

Old House, Hoi Pa Village
- Traditional Chinese: 海壩村古屋
Transcriptions
Yue: Cantonese
- Yale Romanization: Hói baa chyūn gú ūk
- Jyutping: Hoi2 baa3 cyun1 gu2 uk1

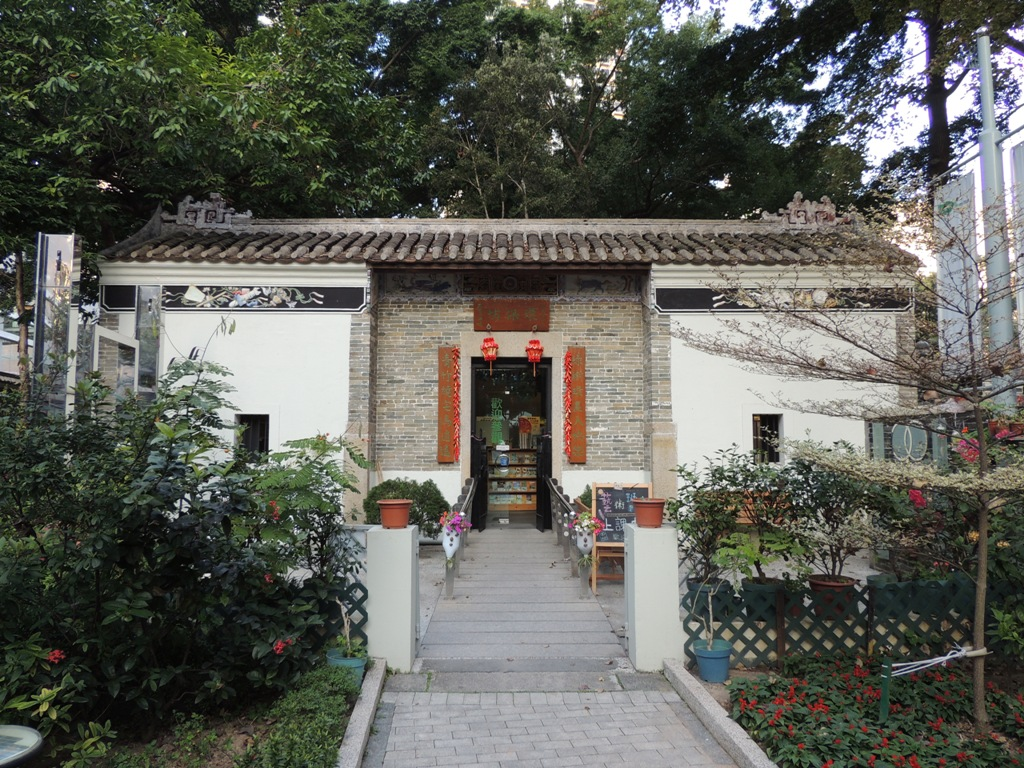
Old House, in Hoi Pa Village. Now housing the Tsuen Wan Environmental Resource Centre.

Tsuen Wan Environmental Resource Centre is housed in Old House, Hoi Pa Village, in Tak Wah Park, Tak Wah Street, Tsuen Wan, Hong Kong.

== History ==
The Old House, is originally one of the houses of former Hoi Pa Village (海壩村), a Hakka mixed-lineage village. It was built by Mr. Yau Yuen-cheung (1865–1937), a village scholar of Hoi Pa Village. The old house was built with rammed earth, green bricks, green tiles and timber. It is a fine example of traditional southern Chinese village architecture.

The village house, together with the adjacent areas, has now been developed into the Tak Wah Park.

After the Antiquities and Monuments Office had given the approval to convert the historical village house into an environment resource centre, the renovation work was done. The Centre was opened in December 1997. It is a joint venture of the Environmental Protection Department and the Conservancy Association. It has been a declared monument since 1986.

== Facilities ==
There is a library, a computer room, an AV room, an exhibition area and a Green Home Exhibition Area.

A Chinese plaque says Eco Place and a Chinese couplet says Happy are people in this house environed by green trees; birds fly freely around this place surrounded by bamboo which is found hanging at the entrance of the Centre.
