= Tse Chin-wan =

Hong Kong government official (born 1957)

The Honourable Tse Chin-wan BBS JP
- 謝展寰
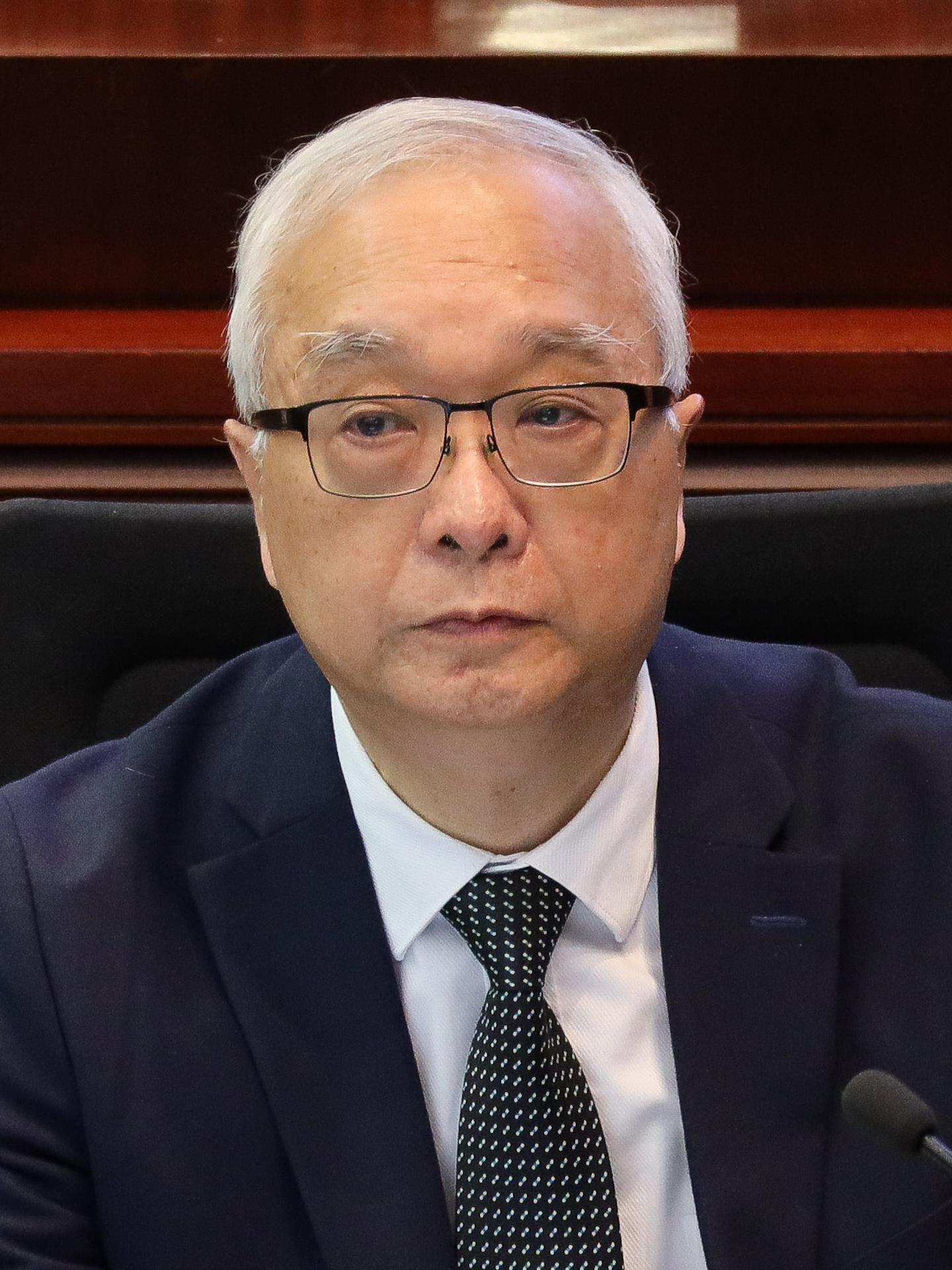
- Tse in 2023

Secretary for Environment and Ecology
- Incumbent
- Assumed office 1 July 2022
- Chief Executive: John Lee Ka-chiu
- Preceded by: Wong Kam-sing (as Secretary for the Environment)

Under Secretary for Environment
- In office 2 August 2017 – 30 June 2022
- Preceded by: Christine Loh
- Succeeded by: Diane Wong Shuk-han (as Under Secretary for Environment and Ecology)

Personal details
- Born: 15 October 1957 (age 68) British Hong Kong
- Education: CCC Chuen Yuen Second Primary School; Tsuen Wan Government Secondary School the University of Hong Kong

Tse Chin-wan BBS JP (Chinese: 謝展寰, born 15 October 1957) is a Hong Kong government official, the current Secretary for Environment and Ecology.

Tse graduated from CCC Chuen Yuen Second Primary School in 1970 (enrolled in 1964), studied at the Tsuen Wan Government Secondary School during the 1970s, and joined the government in June 1985 as an officer in the Environmental Protection Agency (now the Environmental Protection Department). He was promoted to assistant director of the department in 1996 and deputy director in 2013. In 2017, he was appointed Under Secretary for Environment, and the newly created Secretary for Environment and Ecology in 2022.

== Fukushima ban ==
Tse has caused a diplomatic row after he announced in July 2023 the ban on seafood imports from 10 Japanese prefectures over the release of radioactive waste water from the Fukushima nuclear plant into the sea. Hirokazu Matsuno, Japanese Chief Cabinet Secretary, said Hong Kong's import ban, which followed Chinese decisions, was "extremely regrettable".

According to a Nikkei report, Naoto Nakahara, deputy consul general of Japan in Hong Kong, said the Hong Kong authorities are "trying to win brownie points from Beijing", and the consulate had "shifted gears" to rebut the Hong Kong government's narrative in a bid to "protect the interests of those selling Japanese food products in Hong Kong". Tse, in response, said the measures were devised according to the city's own assessment.

Political offices
Previous: Wong Kam-sing (as Secretary for the Environment)	Secretary for Environment and Ecology; 1 July 2022 –	Incumbent
Previous: Christine Loh	Under Secretary for Environment; 2 August 2017 – 30 June 2022	Next: Diane Wong (as Under Secretary for Environment and Ecology)
