= Environmental Protection Department =

Department of the Hong Kong Government

- 環境保護署

Agency overview
- Formed: 1986; 40 years ago
- Headquarters: 15 to 16/F Central Government Offices, 4-6 Tim Mei Avenue, Admiralty, Hong Kong
- Employees: 1,620 (March 2008)
- Annual budget: 3,349.4m HKD (2008-09)
- Agency executive: Miss Janice Tse Siu-wa, JP, Permanent Secretary for the Environment / Director of Environmental Protection
- Parent agency: Environment and Ecology Bureau
- Website: www.epd.gov.hk

Environmental Protection Department
- Traditional Chinese: 環境保護署
- Simplified Chinese: 环境保护署
Transcriptions
Standard Mandarin
- Hanyu Pinyin: Huánjìngbǎohù Shǔ
Yue: Cantonese
- Yale Romanization: Wàahn gíng bóu wuh chyúh
- Jyutping: Waan^{4} ging^{2} bou^{2} wu^{6} cyu^{5}

Environmental Protection Department (EPD) is a department of Hong Kong Government concerning the issues of environmental protection in Hong Kong. The EPD is responsible for developing policies covering environmental protection, nature conservation; enforcing environmental legislation; monitoring environmental quality; providing collection, transfer, treatment and disposal facilities for many types of waste; advising on the environmental implications of town planning and new policies; handling pollution complaints and incidents; and raising awareness and support in the community for environmental initiatives.

== History ==
The Environmental Protection Department (EPD) was created in 1986 to co-ordinate and carry out pollution prevention and control activities.

Staff and resources from six government departments were deployed to the EPD. The EPD replaced the Environmental Protection Agency (which had been created in 1981 to replace the Environmental Protection Unit, created in 1977) as the main government body charged with tackling pollution. Between 1986 and 31 March 2005 it functioned mainly as an executive department enforcing environmental laws and implementing environmental policies, the latter having been determined by the relevant policy bureau, most recently the then Environment, Transport and Works Bureau.

On 1 April 2005, the environmental policy-making function carried out by the then Bureau was subsumed within the EPD, with the head of the Environment Branch of the policy bureau taking up the dual role of Permanent Secretary for the Environment and Director of Environmental Protection, placing the EPD in the position of both determining and implementing environmental policy. Subsequent to the re-organisation of government bureaux on 1 July 2007, a new Environment Bureau was formed to oversee the formulation and implementation of environmental policies.

== Reorganisation in 2007 ==
In a re-organisation from 1 July 2007, EPD adopted a structure based on three operational divisions, four policy divisions, a cross-boundary division, and a corporate affairs division.

=== Divisions ===
- The Environmental Infrastructure Division, responsible for planning, developing and managing waste disposal facilities, such as strategic landfills, refuse transfer stations, and a chemical waste treatment centre. The division is also responsible for implementing programmes to reduce waste generation and for regional and local planning for sewerage. The regional and local sewerage planned by this division is implemented by the Drainage Services Department as works agent.
- The Environmental Assessment Division, responsible for reviewing the environmental implications of policies and strategic and local plans, and administering the application of the environmental impact assessment process under the Environmental Impact Assessment Ordinance. This division is also responsible for policy formulation, strategic planning and programme development in the area of environmental impact assessment and environmental noise management.
- The Environmental Compliance Division, responsible for enforcing pollution laws and facilitating business not only to comply with environmental requirements but also going beyond compliance.
- The Air Policy Division, responsible for policy formulation, strategic planning and program development in the field of air quality management.
- The Water Policy Division, responsible for policy formulation, strategic planning and programme development in the area of water quality management. This includes policy in relation to sewage treatment, and strategic planning for sewerage and sewage treatment facilities which are implemented by the Drainage Services Department.
- The Waste Management Policy Division, responsible for policy formulation, strategic planning and program development in the field of waste management. This includes policy for waste reduction and recycling.
- The Nature Conservation and Infrastructure Planning Division, responsible for the formulation of nature conservation policy, the development of the Integrated Waste Management Facilities, and also the development of the Pilot Biodegradable Waste Treatment Plant and the Organic Waste Treatment Facilities. Implementation of nature conservation policy however rests with the Agriculture, Fisheries and Conservation Department.
- The Cross-Boundary & International Division, responsible for liaison with the Mainland authorities on environmental issues of mutual concern, and also for the development of plans to implement the Stockholm Convention on persistent organic pollutants.
- The Corporate Affairs Division, responsible for the departmental administration support, accounting, resources management, human resources management, information technology and knowledge management, and also provides support to HRM reforms and corporate development.

The department employs about 1,600 staff, about one-quarter of whom are professional staff, half are technical-grade staff and the remainder are administrative and support staff.

As at October 2021, the post of Director of the department and Permanent Secretary for the Environment in the Environment Bureau is vacant. Until 17 January 2022, the government announced the appointment of Janice Tse, the former Director of Home Affairs, as the new Director of the department and Permanent Secretary for the Environment.

== Reorganisation in 2022 ==
In July 2022, as the Environment Bureau reorganized into Environment and Ecology Bureau, the title "Permanent Secretary for the Environment" has changed to "Permanent Secretary for the Environment and Ecology".

== Air quality monitoring ==
Air quality monitoring by the department is reported by 13 general stations and three roadside stations. On 8 March 2012, the department started reporting data on fine suspended particulates in the air on an hourly basis, that are a leading component of smog. It began regular monitoring of PM2.5 levels, which measure 2.5 micrometres in diameter or less, at three stations since 2005, but the data were never publicised.

== Other work ==
The department also works with local organisations for advocacy work, including with the Geography Society of PLK Vicwood KT Chong Sixth Form College between 2008 and 2009.

== Environmental Resource Centre ==
- Fanling Environmental Resource Centre
- Tsuen Wan Environmental Resource Centre
- Wan Chai Environmental Resource Centre

== See also ==
- Air pollution in Hong Kong
