= Food and Environmental Hygiene Department =

Hong Kong government department

- 食物環境衞生署

Agency overview
- Formed: 1 January 2000; 26 years ago
- Preceding agencies: Urban Council; Regional Council
- Headquarters: 44/F Queensway Government Offices, 66 Queensway, Hong Kong
- Employees: 11,153 (March 2014)
- Annual budget: HK$5,667,200,000 (2014-15 estimate)
- Agency executive: Albert Yuen Yuk-kin, Director of Food and Environmental Hygiene
- Parent agency: Environment and Ecology Bureau
- Child agency: Centre for Food Safety
- Website: www.fehd.gov.hk

Food and Environmental Hygiene Department
- Traditional Chinese: 食物環境衞生署
- Simplified Chinese: 食物环境衞生署
- Jyutping: Sik6 mat6 waan4 ging2 wai6 sang1 cyu5
Transcriptions
Standard Mandarin
- Hanyu Pinyin: Shíwù Huánjìng Wèishēng Shǔ
Yue: Cantonese
- Yale Romanization: Sihk maht wàahn gíng waih sāng chyúh
- Jyutping: Sik6 mat6 waan4 ging2 wai6 sang1 cyu5

Alternative Chinese name
- Traditional Chinese: 食環署
- Simplified Chinese: 食环署
- Jyutping: Sik6 waan4 cyu5
Transcriptions
Standard Mandarin
- Hanyu Pinyin: Shíhuánshǔ
Yue: Cantonese
- Yale Romanization: Sihk wàahn chyúh
- Jyutping: Sik6 waan4 cyu5

The Food and Environmental Hygiene Department (FEHD) is a department of the Hong Kong Government, reporting to the Environment and Ecology Bureau. It is responsible for food hygiene and environmental hygiene. It replaced part of the role of the Urban Council and the Urban Services Department, and the Regional Council and the Regional Services Department.

== History ==
Establishment

Pursuant to the passing of the Provision of Municipal Services (Reorganisation) Bill in 1999, the Provisional Regional and Urban Councils were dissolved along with the establishment of the Food and Environmental Hygiene Department. According to the bill, changes to the structure for the delivery of municipal services should be adopted, with a new department dedicated for the environment and food assuming responsibility for all functions relating to food safety and environmental hygiene.

The motivations behind FEHD's establishment were mostly because of an institutional "system failure and negligence" to address repeated incidents in food handling and food-borne infectious diseases. As Dr. Leong Che-hung, former Legislative Council member noted, Hong Kong was on the verge of a cholera outbreak caused by filthy and unhygienic states of food manufacturers earlier in 1997, which was exacerbated by the Provisional Regional and Urban Councils' failure to oversee the actual operations after issuing licences, and the Department of Health's failure to step in in time. The incident exposed the institutional gap, which was clearly an operational gap of "lack of leadership in the overall improvement of food safety and environmental hygiene" and a policy gap of a "central body responsible for policy formulation of food safety and environmental hygiene". To address these deficiencies, the Legislative Council passed the bill on 2 December 1999.

Development

Major structural reforms

Proposed reorganization of the FEHD In 2005, the then Chief Executive Donald Tsang addressed in his Policy Address to reorganise government departments and establish a new Food Safety, Inspection and Quarantine Department. The proposed reorganization was motivated by the food safety incidents of Mainland food supplies to Hong Kong including poultry, livestock, marine products and other non-staple food on a daily basis. The new department proposed to consolidate functions that were performed by the Agriculture, Fisheries and Conservation Department and the FEHD, including the monitoring and controlling of imported and local live food and non-food animals, poultry and birds, and the safety of vegetables, meat, seafood and food products.

However, the reorganisation was never implemented due to doubts and concerns by legislators as to the effectiveness of the new department in improving quality control of Mainland and foreign food supplies.

Establishment of the Centre for Food Safety

In 2006, the Centre for Food Safety was established under FEHD. The purpose of the agency is to ensure food is safe and fit for consumption through tripartite collaboration among the government, food trade, and consumers. Its establishment was first proposed in 2005, after a chain of food safety incidents of an outbreak of Streptococcus suis and freshwater fish contaminated with malachite green.

Response to public health crisis

Severe Acute Respiratory Syndrome (SARS) in 2003

During the outbreak of SARS in Hong Kong, FEHD created about 3,000 temporary jobs for six months in response to the Government's package of relief measures to help the community. FEHD also introduced relief measures (e.g. rental waiver) to help market tenants during the outbreak. Further, FEHD was responsible for the provision of environmental hygiene services by providing cleansing and pest control services and disinfecting over 750 infected units during the outbreak.

H5N1 Avian Influenza Virus

In June 2008, faecal samples from poultry stalls in Sham Shui Po were tested positive of H5N1, more than 2,000 poultry were culled. Environmental samples from Luen Wo Hui Market, Yan Oi Market, Ap Lei Chau Market and Po On Road Market were tested positive of H5N1. The live poultry retail outlets underwent thorough cleaning and disinfection, all unsold poultry in the outlets were slaughtered. FEHD, together with the Agriculture, Fisheries and Conservation Department, inspected all live poultry stalls and fresh provision shops selling live poultry before the resumption of sale.

Swine Influenza

FEHD conducted cleansing and disinfection operations in Metro Park Hotel in Wan Chai with almost 300 people under quarantine after the first confirmed imported case of human swine influenza. A funding of $99 million was approved by the Financial Committee of the Legislative Council to enhance the environmental hygiene of the community.

COVID-19 Pandemic in Hong Kong (2020 - present) FEHD has been conducting joint operations with the Police to take enforcement measures against parties like catering businesses and their customers, general public, etc. according to the anti-epidemic regulations, including the Prevention and Control of Disease (Requirements and Directions) (Business and Premises) Regulation (Cap. 599F), the Prevention and Control of Disease (Vaccine Pass) Regulation (Cap. 599L), etc.

Together with the Hong Kong Police Force, the Labour Department, relevant District Offices and the Leisure and Cultural Services Department, FEHD has conducted operations at public places during weekends and public holidays. FEHD has also carried out educational and publicity work, and reminded domestic helpers to comply with the COVID-19-related regulations, such as mask wearing and prohibition of gatherings in public places. In light of the COVID-19 pandemic, FEHD has implemented measures at its public toilets, such as enhancing disinfection and cleansing services, and installing in phases sensor-type hand sanitisers and sensor-type toilet seat sanitisers. Anti-microbial coating was also applied to these toilets. FEHD also arranged cleaning service contractors to strengthen services provided in certain areas.

In April 2021, FEHD launched a webpage (https://www.fehd.gov.hk/english/events/covid19/vaccine_bubble_FP.html) that provides relevant information and working tools to help catering premises and scheduled premises operators to understand the operation details during the pandemic.

In July 2022, due to the re-organization of the Government Secretariat, FEHD has changed to report to the Environment and Ecology Bureau.

== Organization and operations ==
Organization

The FEHD consists of four branches including the Centre for Food Safety, the Environmental Hygiene Branch, the Administration & Development Branch and the Private Columbaria Affairs Office.

Duties

The FEHD is responsible for providing civil services, performing policy and enforcing law/regulations in the following areas.

Food Safety

The food safety authority under FEHD is the Centre for Food Safety. Its mission is to ensure that food is safe and fit for consumer's consumption through tripartite collaborations among the government, food trade, and consumers.

Licensing

Licensing is an environmental hygiene service provided by the Environmental Hygiene Branch. Licences that process through the FEHD include Restaurant (Full Licence), Restaurant (Provisional Licence), Liquor Licence, Non-restaurant Food Business Licence, Trade Licences, Outside Seating Accommodation (OSA) and Transfer of Food Licence.

Cleansing Services

Cleansing services provided by FEHD includes street cleansing, waste collection, gully cleansing conservancy services, poster removal, public refuse collection points, public toilets and public bathhouse vehicles.

Regarding street cleaning, FEHD and its cleansing contractors have a total workforce of about 13,500 to keep the city clean and provide cleansing services, including street sweeping and waste collection. Currently, FEHD is responsible for cleaning about 11,500 litter containers and about 1,900 dog excreta collection bins at least once a day.

Since public toilets are provided mainly at tourist spots and busy areas, FEHD pledges to ensure public toilets are kept clean at all times. FEHD employs attendants to station at those with high usage or located in tourist spots to provide immediate cleansing services, in addition to regular deep cleansing operations. To enhance the efficiency of cleaning, the FEHD actively explores the use of new technologies to improve the hygiene of public toilets.

Hawker control

The Hawker Control Team (HCT) is responsible for controlling hawking activities at all levels. Currently, FEHD deploys about 190 squads of Hawker Control Teams (124 squads in Hong Kong and Kowloon and 66 squads in the New Territories).

The teams are responsible for management of licensed hawkers. The teams work to ensure licensed hawkers operate their stalls in accordance with the conditions of their licences and laws and control street obstruction and nuisances caused by licensed hawkers. The teams are also vested with law-enforcement powers to inspect licensed fixed-pitch hawker stalls regularly and regulate the operation of itinerant hawkers whenever they are found hawking in the streets.

In the year of 2020, there were 3,334 convictions of unlicensed hawker or hawker-related offences in 2020. At the end of December 2020, the number of unlicensed hawkers was around 1,192.

Pest Control Pest control work includes work to control the rodents, mosquitoes and other arthropod pests which would risk public health. The work is carried out by the Pest Control Teams of FEHD.

Since FEHD's establishment, it has been conducting the Rodent Infestation Survey (RIS) regularly by setting baits in designated survey locations to monitor rodent infestation. The RIS is a useful indicator for the general situation of rodent infestation in individual survey locations and forms the basis for devising anti-rodent measures. The results also serve as reference for assessing the overall efficacy of rodent prevention and disinfestation work. The overall Rodent Infestation Rate for the first half of 2021 was 2.8%, falling under Level 1, indicating that rodent infestation in public areas in Hong Kong was not extensive during the survey period, and lower than the 3.6 per cent recorded for the second half of 2020.

According to the latest available documents, the annual budget for rodent control was HK$569 million in 2021, which recorded a rise of 28%. The number of rodents caught was 67,182, meaning the cost of catching each rodent was $10,880.

Operation of Public Facilities

The FEHD is responsible for operating facilities like markets, cooked food centres, public toilets, slaughterhouses, refuse collection points, cemeteries, crematoriums, and columbariums. FEHD also holds Lunar New Year Fairs in different districts annually.

Directorates

The FEHD is led by the Director of Food and Environmental Hygiene. Each branch is led by their respective Directorate. The Directorates are as follows:

Branch	Directorate	Title
Food and Environmental Hygiene Department	Ms YOUNG Bick-kwan, Irene, JP	Director of Food and Environmental Hygiene
Centre for Food Safety	Dr WONG Wang, Christine	Controller, Centre for Food Safety
Environmental Hygiene Branch	Mr YIU Kai-cheuk	Deputy Director (Environmental Hygiene)
Administration & Development Branch	Mr LAW Kin-wai	Deputy Director (Administration and Development)
Private Columbaria Affairs Office	Ms WONG Hoi-wan, Charmaine, JP	Head, Private Columbaria Affairs Office

== Policies and Operations ==
Enforcement of the Fixed Penalty System

The FEHD carries out daily enforcement action to prosecute littering offenders. To step up law enforcement to keep Hong Kong clean, the Fixed Penalty System against the following common public cleanliness offences is introduced to tackle littering; spitting; unauthorised display of bills or posters; and fouling of street by dog faeces.

On 27 May 2003, the Fixed Penalty System was introduced to provide a fixed penalty of $600 for any person who commits the offence of littering, spitting, the unauthorised display of bills or posters, and allowing the gouling of streets by dogs in public places. The Fixed Penalty (Public Cleanliness Offences) Ordinance (Cap. 570) also came into force. The initial fixed penalty was set at HK$600, and increased from $600 to $1,500 soon after its introduction in June 2003. In September 2016, a fixed penalty system was introduced as an additional enforcement tool to deal with the problem of shop front extensions. The FEHD and the Police were empowered to enforce the fixed penalty system.

During the year of 2021, enforcement officers of the FEHD issued over 50,900 fixed penalty notices against cleanliness offences. The cases involved a total fines of about $76.35 million.

Enforcement against Shopfront Extension Problem

Since the 2010s, the issue of illegal extension of business from shops has been an emerging crisis. Street management issue falls within the ambit of several government departments requiring joint-departmental efforts, of which the FEHD has been taking enforcement actions against illegal activities.

In June 2015, the FEHD set up three shop front extension control task force teams to strengthen enforcement actions in shop front extension blackspots in Hong Kong. On 31 December 2015, the Government gazetted the Fixed Penalty (Public Cleanliness Offences) (Amendment) Bill 2015 to introduce a fixed penalty system as an additional legal tool to tackle the problem of shop front extensions.

As one of the departments to enforce the proposed fixed penalty system, in 2020, over 3,200 prosecutions and 10,734 fixed penalty notices were instituted against shop front extensions.

Administration of the Anti-Epidemic Fund

Following the Government's earlier announcement of the Sixth Round of the Anti-epidemic Fund, subsidies will be provided to commercial bathhouse licence holders, places of public entertainment licence (PPEL) holders and tenants of cooked food/light refreshment stalls at Food and Environmental Hygiene Department Markets subsidy scheme. The Commercial Bathhouse Licence Holder Subsidy Scheme will offer a one-off subsidy of $100,000 to each eligible licence holder. The PPEL Holder Subsidy Scheme will provide a one-off subsidy of $100,000 for each eligible holder of a PPEL and $20,000 for each eligible holder of a temporary PPEL. A one-off subsidy of $20,000 will be provided to the Tenants of Cooked Food/Light Refreshment Stalls at FEHD Markets Subsidy Scheme. Qualified applicants may submit their applications to the FEHD.

== Cemeteries and crematoria ==
The department manages ten public cemeteries: Hong Kong Cemetery, Mount Caroline Cemetery, New Kowloon Cemetery No. 8 (Diamond Hill Urn Cemetery), Prison Cemetery (Stanley), Wo Hop Shek Cemetery, Cheung Chau Cemetery, Tai O Cemetery, Mui Wo Lai Chi Yuen Cemetery and two cemeteries in Sandy Ridge. It operates six government crematoria (at Cape Collinson in Hong Kong Island, Diamond Hill in Kowloon, Fu Shan, Kwai Chung, Wo Hop Shek and Cheung Chau in the New Territories) and eleven public columbaria (at Cape Collinson and Wong Nai Chung Road in Hong Kong Island, Diamond Hill in Kowloon, Fu Shan, Kwai Chung, Tsang Tsui, Wo Hop Shek, Cheung Chau, Lamma Island, Peng Chau and Lai Chi Yuen in the New Territories).

== Controversies ==
Enforcement of Unlicensed Hawking Activities

The FEHD often attracted criticism over unlicensed hawking charges. It has also often attracted criticism for charging poor or homeless people collecting and selling refuse.

The 2015 Bicycle Repair Man Incident

In June 2015, a 65-year-old man surnamed Suen was arrested by officers of FEHD. Suen offered free bicycle repairs every morning on Sha Kok Street and would only charge bicycle owners for parts, if required. FEHD officers arrested him after they had observed him receiving money from bicycle owners.

The charges brought against Suen were unlicensed hawking and obstructing public spaces. Under the Public Hygiene and Municipal Services Ordinance (Cap. 132), unlicensed hawking activities carry a maximum fine of HK$5,000 and one month in prison for first convictions. Subsequent convictions carry a maximum penalty of HK$10,000 and a six-month sentence. Under the Summary Offences Ordinance, obstruction of public places carries a maximum fine of HK$5000 and three months imprisonment.

After the incident went public, the Hong Kong Cycling Alliance voiced criticism against the FEHD that the charges were intended to control unlicensed commercial activity, not a volunteer kindly offering generous services for free and for the public good. A Shatin community group also issued a petition in support of Suen, which reportedly collected more than 50 signatures from residents in the district.

Eventually, prosecutors withdrew the charges brought against 65-year-old Mr. Suen and returned his tools.

The 2017 Cardboard Woman Incident

In June 2017, a 75-year-old Hong Kong woman surnamed Chu was arrested by six FEHD officers at the Central piers when she was selling cardboard scraps to a domestic helper for HK$1. The charge filed against her was unlicensed hawking. Under the Public Hygiene and Municipal Services Ordinance, first convictions of unlicensed hawking carry a maximum monetary penalty of HK$5,000 and one month in prison. Subsequent convictions carry a maximum penalty of HK$10,000 and a six-month sentence.

The elderly woman worked as a contract cleaning worker. However, due to poor economic conditions, she collected and sold cardboard on the streets to supplement her income. 75-year-old Mrs. Chu also suffered from various ailments She reportedly suffered from rheumatoid arthritis, which caused her fingers to bend, and gastritis. In addition, she also suffers from high blood pressure, high blood sugar, and high cholesterol. Despite her pleas for leniency, Chu was subsequently taken to the FEHD department office and the police station. She was released on bail for HK$30, which left only HK$34 in her purse. In addition, her cardboard and trolley had also been confiscated.

Chu reached out to Civic Party Eastern District councillor Lai Chi-keong for help. After the story went public, around 30 Hongkongers staged a protest against the FEHD at the Central and Western District Environmental Hygiene Office. The Civic Party also launched a petition demanding that the FEHD drop their charges against Chu, return her property, and apologise to her. The petition received 14,000 signatures in just five days. Civic Party lawmakers also led a protest outside government offices in Admiralty.

After consulting the Department of Justice and considering Chu's background, the FEHD dropped the unlicensed hawking activity charge against the 75-year-old.

Monitoring of Street Cleansing Services and Management of Public Toilets

There have been complaints over the quality of the outsourced street cleansing services, as well as the management of public toilets by FEHD.

Since the street cleansing services are outsourced to contractors by FEHD via a tendering mechanism, there has been frequent criticisms over the poor quality of service as a result of the so-called “lowest bid wins” principles. Besides, FEHD's monitoring over the performance of outsourced contractors was commonly considered as inadequate, with complaints about rubbish piling up on the streets, and the poor cleansing of environmental hygiene black spots remain prominent.

Similarly, the management of about 800 public toilets in the territory lies within the responsibility of the FEHD, and the daily cleansing and minor repairs are outsourced to the department's contractors. While the FEHD should make recommendations to the Architectural Services Department every year, regarding the criterion over renovating certain public toilets, maintenance conditions, usage rates and locations of each public toilet, the poor hygiene conditions, there are media reports about the poor hygiene conditions, dilapidated facilities, as well as the long reaction time and the long duration for repairing damaged facilities. Such a situation is not only considered as bringing inconvenience to the public, but also creating a negative impact to Hong Kong's image.

In view of the situation, the Ombudsman of Hong Kong Special Administrative Region (SAR) of China, Ms Winnie Chiu, announced on May 15, 2019, two direct investigations to examine the monitoring of outsourced street cleansing services by the FEHD, and the management of public toilets.

Food Safety and Related Law Enforcement

In early 2019, The FEHD faced criticism by the Ombudsman regarding their handling of complaints related to food safety and related law enforcement actions. It was reported that in a prosecution case of black worm being found inside a dish of boiled prawns, the FEHD have failed to pursue prosecution against the reported restaurant

The FEHD had defended itself by claiming that the species of the worm could not be determined despite repeated examinations at its Pest Control division, government laboratories and the Biodiversity Conservation Division of the Agriculture, Fisheries and Conservation Department.Therefore, the Centre for Food Safety under FEHD has therefore decided not to prosecute the restaurant due to lack of sufficient evidence, and the possibility that the worm was in the shrimp itself, claiming that a warning letter to the restaurant was enough to impose a deterrent effect.

A senior investigation officer of the Office of the Ombudsman, Chu Man-yan alleged that the FEHD failed to fulfil its role as the gatekeeper for food safety, as the three mentioned departments the FEHD contacted were not specialists in worms study, and the FEHD should have tried to locate authoritative specialists in the field, while the claim that the worm could have come from the shrimp was unreasonable and unacceptable. The Ombudsman also suggested that there are difficulties for consumers to determine whether the food products they purchase are safe to eat, while the FEHD should be held responsible for gatekeeping.

An FEHD spokesperson said the department will accept the recommendations from the Ombudsman and that they have taken measures to improve the existing mechanism on handling complaints and investigations.

=== Lunar New Year Fair stalls ===
In November 2023, the FEHD blocked winning bids from members of the Democratic Party, who were looking to have bid on stalls for the upcoming Lunar New Year Fair. The FEHD had also blocked pro-democracy figures from winning bids on stalls in 2017 and 2021. An SCMP editorial criticized the government and stated that "Officials should be giving a reason as to why the Democratic Party's successful bid for a dry goods stall at the Victoria Park Lunar New Year Fair was rejected."

== See also ==
- 2016 Mong Kok civil unrest
