= Centre for Food Safety =

Hong Kong food safety authority

- 食物安全中心
- The Centre for Food Safety Logo

Agency overview
- Formed: 2 May 2006
- Headquarters: 43/F Queensway Government Offices, 66 Queensway, Hong Kong
- Agency executive: Dr WONG Wang, Christine, Controller, Centre for Food Safety
- Parent agency: Food and Environmental Hygiene Department
- Website: www.cfs.gov.hk

Centre for Food Safety (CFS; Chinese: 食物安全中心) is the food safety authority of the Hong Kong government. Its mission is to ensure food is safe and fit for consumption through tripartite collaboration among the government, food trade, and consumers. The CFS was created in May 2006 under the Food and Environmental Hygiene Department of the Environment and Ecology Bureau.

== History ==
Plans to form a separate agency to specifically tackle food safety were proposed in 2005, following multiple food safety incidents including an outbreak of Streptococcus suis and freshwater fish contaminated with malachite green. At its initial conception, the centre was expected to take a similar structure as the Centre for Health Protection, and bring together experts from various fields to tackle food safety issues.

A proposal for the centre was rejected by the Legislative Council on 18 January 2006, citing concerns of marginalising veterinarians and lacking clarity.

Within the first months after the centre is set up, legislators complained that the centre had been doing too little to effective control food safety in Hong Kong.

== Logo ==
The department's orange colour is adopted in the Centre logo plus the green colour representing "safety and hope". The letters 'C', 'F' and 'S' are abbreviation for Centre for Food Safety.
