= Museums of modern art =

Museums of modern art listed alphabetically by country.

== Argentina ==
- Latin American Art Museum of Buenos Aires (MALBA)
- Buenos Aires Museum of Modern Art (MAMBA)

== Australia ==
- Museum of Contemporary Art, Sydney 140 George Street, The Rocks, Sydney
- Heide Museum of Modern Art, Bulleen, Melbourne

== Austria ==
- Museum Moderner Kunst (MUMOK) Ludwig Foundation, Museumsquartier, Vienna
- Kunsthalle Wien, Museumsquartier, Vienna
- Museum Moderner Kunst Kärnten (MMKK), Klagenfurt, Kärnten
- Museum der Moderne Salzburg, Salzburg

== Belgium ==
- Kanal Centre Pompidou, Brussels
- Centre Belge de la Bande Dessinée, Brussels
- Musée communal des Beaux-Arts d'Ixelles, rue Jean Van Volsem 71, 1050 Ixelles
- Musée d'art spontané, rue de la Constitution, 27 à 1030 Brussels
- Musée royal d'art moderne à Bruxelles, Place Royale 1–2, à 1000 Brussels
- Museum of Modern Art, Antwerp

== Brazil ==
- Museu de Arte Moderna de São Paulo, (MAM-SP)
- Museu de Arte Moderne do Rio de Janeiro, (MAM-RJ)

== Canada ==
- Musée d'art contemporain de Montréal, Montréal
- Museum of Contemporary Canadian Art (MOCCA), Toronto

== Croatia ==
- Museum of Modern Art, Dubrovnik
- Modern Gallery, Zagreb
- Museum of Contemporary Art, Zagreb
- Ivan Meštrović Gallery, Split

== Colombia ==
- Museo de Arte Moderno de Bogotá, Bogotá
- Museo de Arte Moderno de Medellin, Medellín

== Denmark ==
- Louisiana Museum of Modern Art, Humlebæk
- ARoS Aarhus Kunstmuseum, Aarhus

== Ecuador ==
Museo Antropologico y de Arte Contemporaneo (MAAC), Guayaquil

== England ==
- Annely Juda, 23 Derring Street, London.

Russian Constructivism and contemporary

- Estorick Collection of Modern Italian Art, 39a Canonbury Square, London.

Modern Italian Art

- Middlesbrough Institute of Modern Art, Centre Square, Middlesbrough
- Modern Art Oxford, 30 Pembroke Street, Oxford
- Serpentine Gallery, Kensington Gardens, London
- Tate Modern, Bankside, London.
- Tate Britain, Millbank, London
- Tate St Ives, Porthmeor Beach, St Ives, Cornwall.
- Tate Liverpool, Royal Albert Dock, Liverpool
- Turner Contemporary (one of the Tate network Margate, Kent
- Victoria & Albert Museum, London.

== Ethiopia ==
- Modern Art Museum: Gebre Kristos Desta Center of Addis Ababa University

== Finland ==
- Kiasma Museum of Contemporary Art, Helsinki, Finland

== France ==
- Château de Montsoreau-Museum of Contemporary Art, Montsoreau
- Espace Dalí, Paris
- Faure Museum, Aix-les-Bains
- Museum of Grenoble, Grenoble
- Musée d'Art Moderne de Céret, Céret
- Musée d'art moderne, Abattoirs de Toulouse, Toulouse
- Musée d'Orsay, Paris
- Musée Marmottan Monet, Paris
- Musée national d'art moderne, Centre Georges-Pompidou, Paris
- Musée Picasso, Paris
- Musée Rodin, Paris
- Musée d'Art Moderne de la Ville de Paris, Paris
- Musée de l'Orangerie, Paris
- Musée d'Art Moderne de Lille Métropole, Villeneuve d'Ascq
- Musée Cantini, Marseille
- Musée des Beaux-Arts de Lyon, Lyon
- Musée des Beaux-Arts de Rouen, Rouen
- Museum of Modern and Contemporary Art, Strasbourg

== Germany ==
- Buchheim-Museum, see Museum der Phantasie below
- Deutsche Guggenheim, Unter den Linden 13–15, 10117 Berlin
- Galerie für Zeitgenössische Kunst Leipzig
- Galerie Neue Meister, Albertinum, Brühlsche Terrasse, 01067 Dresden
- Hamburger Kunsthalle, Hamburg
- Kaiser-Wilhelm-Museum, Krefeld
- König-Albert-Museum, Chemnitz
- Kunsthalle Bielefeld, Bielefeld
- Kunsthalle Erfurt, Erfurt
- Kunsthalle Kiel, Kiel
- Kunsthalle Mannheim, Mannheim
- Kunsthalle Nürnberg, Nuremberg
- Kunsthalle Rostock, Rostock
- Kunsthalle Würth, Schwäbisch Hall
- Kunstmuseum Bonn, Bonn
- Kunstmuseum Magdeburg, Regierungsstraße 4–6, 39104 Magdeburg
- Kunstmuseum Stuttgart, Stuttgart
- Kunstmuseum Wolfsburg, Wolfsburg
- Kunstsammlung Nordrhein-Westfalen, Düsseldorf
- Lehmbruck-Museum, Duisburg
- Lenbachhaus, Munich
- Ludwig Forum für Internationale Kunst, Jülicher Straße 97–109, 52070 Aachen
- Museum Berggruen, Berlin
- Museum Bochum - Kunstsammlung, Bochum
- Museum der bildenden Künste, Leipzig
- Museum der Phantasie, Bernried
- Museum Folkwang, Essen
- Museum Frieder Burda, Baden-Baden
- Museum für Gegenwart, Hamburger Bahnhof, Berlin
- Museum für Moderne Kunst, Domstrasse 10, 60311 Frankfurt am Main
- Museum für Neue Kunst, Karlsruhe
- Museum Küppersmühle, Duisburg
- Museum Ludwig, Cologne
- Museum Ostwall, Dortmund
- Museum Wiesbaden, Wiesbaden
- Museum Würth, Künzelsau-Gaisbach
- Neue Nationalgalerie, Berlin
- Neue Staatsgalerie, Stuttgart
- Neues Museum Nürnberg, Nuremberg
- Pinakothek der Moderne, Munich
- Schirn Kunsthalle Frankfurt, Frankfurt
- Sprengel Museum, Hanover
- Staatliche Kunsthalle Karlsruhe, Karlsruhe
- Städel - Städelsches Kunstinstitut, Frankfurt am Main
- Städtische Galerie Erlangen, Erlangen
- Städtisches Museum Gelsenkirchen, Horster Straße 5–7, 45897 Gelsenkirchen
- Von-der-Heydt-Museum, Wuppertal
- Wilhelm-Hack-Museum, Ludwigshafen

== Greece ==
- State Museum of Contemporary Art, Building.01, Moni Lazariston, Lagada Street, Thessaloniki
- Macedonian Museum of Contemporary Art, 154, Egnatia Street, Thessaloniki
- Greek National Museum of Contemporary Art, Vas. Georgiou Β' 17-19 and Rigillis street, Athens

== India ==
- National Gallery of Modern Art
- Kolkata Museum of Modern Art

== Indonesia ==
- The Museum of Modern and Contemporary Art in Nusantara (Museum MACAN), Jakarta

== Iran ==
- Museum of Contemporary Art, Laleh Park, Tehran.

== Ireland ==
- Irish Museum of Modern Art, Dublin
- Kerlin Gallery, Dublin
- Luan Gallery, Athlone

== Israel ==
- Tel Aviv Museum of Art, Tel Aviv

== Italy ==
- Bologna Gallery of Modern Art, Bologna
- Ca' Pesaro, Venice
- Centro per l'arte contemporaneo, Luigi Pecci, Prato
- Centro d'Arte Moderna e Contemporaneo, La Spezia
- Museo Morandi, Bologna
- Galleria Nazionale d'Arte Moderna, Rome
- Galleria d'Arte Moderna, Milan
- Palazzo Pitti, Florence
- Peggy Guggenheim Collection, Venice
- Museum of Modern and Contemporary Art of Trento and Rovereto, Trento
- Museo del Novecento, Milan
- Pinacoteca di Brera, Milan
- Galleria Comunale d'Arte Moderna, Rome, Rome
- Museo Morandi, Bologna
- Galleria d'Arte Moderna Palermo
- Museo d'Arte Moderna e Contemporanea Filippo de Pisis, Ferrara
- Museion (Bolzano), Bolzano
- Galleria d'Arte Moderna e Contemporanea, Turin
- Pinacoteca Agnelli, Turin
- Revoltella Museum, Trieste
- Galleria d'Arte Moderna Ricci Oddi, Piacenza
- Fondazione Magnani-Rocca, Parma
- Galleria d'Arte Moderna, Genoa
- Galleria Comunale d'Arte Moderna e Contemporanea, Viareggio
- Galleria Civica d'Arte Moderna e Contemporanea di Latina, Latina
- Galleria d'Arte Moderna e Contemporanea, Bergamo
- Galleria Civica d'Arte Moderna Palazzo S.Margherita, Modena
- Galleria d'Arte Moderna Palazzo Forti, Verona
- Galleria d'Arte Moderna Gama, Albenga
- Galleria Civica d'Arte Moderna, Spoleto
- Galleria d'Arte Moderna Carlo Rizzarda, Feltre
- Galleria Comunale d'Arte, Cagliari
- Museo d'Arte Gallarate Maga, Gallarate
- Museo d'Arte Moderna Vittoria Colonna, Pescara
- Museo d'Arte Moderna e Contemporanea Cavazzini, Udine
- Pinacoteca d'Arte Moderna e Contemporanea Repaci, Palmi
- Museo d'Arte della Città di Ravenna, Ravenna
- Galleria d'Arte Moderna Giannoni, Novara
- Galleria d'Arte Moderna, Nervi
- Museo Pertini, Savona
- Museo d'Arte, Avellino

== Japan ==
- National Museum of Modern Art, Tokyo

== Lebanon ==
- Sursock Museum

== Lithuania ==
- MO Museum, Vilnius
- Contemporary Art Centre (Vilnius)
- National Gallery of Art, Vilnius

== Mexico ==
- Museo de Arte Moderno, Bosque de Chapultapec, Mexico City, 11560 Mexico
- Museo de Arte Contemporáneo, Monterey, Mexico
- Museo Rufino Tamayo, Mexico City, Oaxaca, Mexico

== Monaco ==
- New National Museum of Monaco

== Netherlands ==
- Stedelijk Museum, Amsterdam
- Van Gogh Museum, Amsterdam
- Kunsthal KadE, Amersfoort
- Mondriaanhome, Amersfoort
- Museum voor Moderne Kunst Arnhem, Arnhem
- Van Abbemuseum, Eindhoven
- Groninger Museum, Groningen
- Museum Belvédère, Heerenveen
- Stedelijk Museum 's-Hertogenbosch, 's-Hertogenbosch
- Singer Laren, Laren
- Bonnefantenmuseum, Maastricht
- Kröller-Müller Museum, Otterlo
- Kunsthal, Rotterdam
- Museum Boijmans Van Beuningen, Rotterdam
- Stedelijk Museum Schiedam, Schiedam
- Kunstmuseum Den Haag, The Hague
- Museum De Pont, Tilburg
- Centraal Museum, Utrecht

== Poland ==
- Museum of Art, Łódź
- National Museum, Kraków

== Portugal ==
- Serralves, Porto

== Qatar ==
- Mathaf: Arab Museum of Modern Art, Doha

== Russia ==
- Hermitage Museum, 2, Dvortsovaya Ploshchad, Dvortsovaya Square, 190000 Saint Petersburg
- Pushkin Museum of Fine Arts, Moscow
- Tretyakov Gallery, 10 Krymskiy Val, Moscow
- Garage Museum of Contemporary Art, 9/32 Krymsky Val st., Moscow

== Scotland ==
- Scottish National Gallery of Modern Art, 75 Belford Road, Edinburgh.
- Pier Art Gallery, Stromness, Orkney

== Spain ==
- Guggenheim Museum Bilbao Abandoibarra Et. 2, 48001 Bilbao
- Museo Nacional Centro de Arte Reina Sofía, Madrid
- Thyssen-Bornemisza Museum, Paseo del Prado, 8, Madrid.
- Museu d'Art Contemporani de Barcelona, Barcelona

== Sweden ==
- Moderna Museet, Stockholm
- Moderna Museet Malmö

== Taiwan ==
- Asia Museum of Modern Art, Taichung

== Turkey ==
- Istanbul Modern, Karaköy, Istanbul
- SantralIstanbul, Silahtaraga, Istanbul

== United States ==
- Museum of Modern Art (MoMA), 11 West 53 Street, New York, New York
- Metropolitan Museum of Art, 1000 5th Avenue, New York, New York
- Walker Art Center, Minneapolis, Minnesota
- Museum of Contemporary Art, Chicago, 220 East Chicago Avenue, Chicago, Illinois
- MOCA - Museum of Contemporary Art, Los Angeles, California
- San Francisco Museum of Modern Art, San Francisco
- New Museum, New York City, New York
- Art Institute of Chicago, 111 South Michigan Avenue, Chicago, Illinois
- Bechtler Museum of Modern Art, 420 South Tryon Street, Charlotte, NC
- Contemporary Arts Center, 44 East 6th Street, Cincinnati, Ohio 45202
- DeCordova Sculpture Park and Museum, Lincoln, Massachusetts 01773
- Guggenheim Museum, 1071 Fifth Avenue (at 89th Street) New York, New York 10128-0173
- Weisman Art Museum, Minneapolis, MN
- Hirshhorn Museum and Sculpture Garden, Washington D.C.
- Institute of Contemporary Art, Boston, 100 Northern Avenue, Boston, Massachusetts 02210
- Massachusetts Museum of Contemporary Art, North Adams, Massachusetts
- Museum of Contemporary Art San Diego; San Diego, California
- McNay Art Museum, 6000 N. New Braunfels Ave., San Antonio, Texas 78209
- Modern Art Museum of Fort Worth, 3200 Darnell Street, Fort Worth, Texas 76107
- San Antonio Museum of Art, 200 W. Jones Ave., San Antonio, Texas 78215
- Grey Art Gallery, New York University, 100 Washington Square East, NYC 10003

== Venezuela ==
- Jesús Soto Museum of Modern Art, Germania Avenue, Ciudad Bolívar, Venezuela
- Museo de Arte Contemporaneo de Caracas, Av. Bolívar, Municipio Libertador, Parque Central Complex, Caracas, Venezuela

== Wales ==
- MOMA Cymru/Wales, Y Tabernacl, Heol Penrallt, Machynlleth, Powys SY20 8AJ
