= Galleria d'Arte Moderna =

Galleria d'Arte Moderna or Galleria d'arte moderna may refer to:

- The Galleria d'Arte Moderna Gama in Albenga, Liguria
- The Galleria d'Arte Moderna e Contemporanea in Bergamo, Lombardy
- The Galleria d'Arte Moderna, Bologna in Bologna, Emilia-Romagna
- The Galleria d'Arte Moderna Aroldo Bonzagni in Cento, Emilia-Romagna
- The Galleria d'Arte Moderna Carlo Rizzarda in Feltre, the Veneto
- The Galleria d'Arte Moderna in Palazzo Pitti in Florence, Tuscany
- The Galleria d'Arte Moderna, Genoa in Genoa, Liguria
- The Galleria d'Arte Moderna, Milan in Milan, Lombardy
- The Galleria d'Arte Moderna Giannoni, in Novara, Piemonte
- The Galleria d'Arte Moderna, Palermo in Palermo, Sicily
- The Galleria d'Arte Moderna Ricci Oddi in Piacenza, Emilia-Romagna
- The Galleria d'Arte Moderna Palazzo Forti in Verona, the Veneto
- The Civica Galleria d'Arte Moderna, Savona in Savona, Liguria
- The Galleria Civica d'Arte Moderna in Spoleto, Umbria
- The Galleria Civica d'Arte Moderna e Contemporanea in Turin, Piemonte
- The Galleria Civica d'Arte Moderna e Contemporanea di Latina in Latina, Lazio
- The Galleria Civica d'Arte Moderna Palazzo S. Margherita in Modena, Emilia-Romagna
- The Galleria Comunale d'Arte Moderna, Rome in Rome, Lazio
- The Galleria Comunale d'Arte Moderna e Contemporanea in Viareggio, Tuscany
- The Galleria Internazionale d'Arte Moderna in Venice, the Veneto
- The Galleria Nazionale d'Arte Moderna in Rome, Lazio
