= Marzulli =

Marzulli is an Italian surname. Notable people with the surname include:

- Guido Marzulli (born 1943), Italian painter
- Michele Marzulli (1908–1991), Italian poet and writer
- Rosa Tosches Marzulli (1907–1990), Italian painter
