= Suhanya Raffel =

Australian art historian and museum director

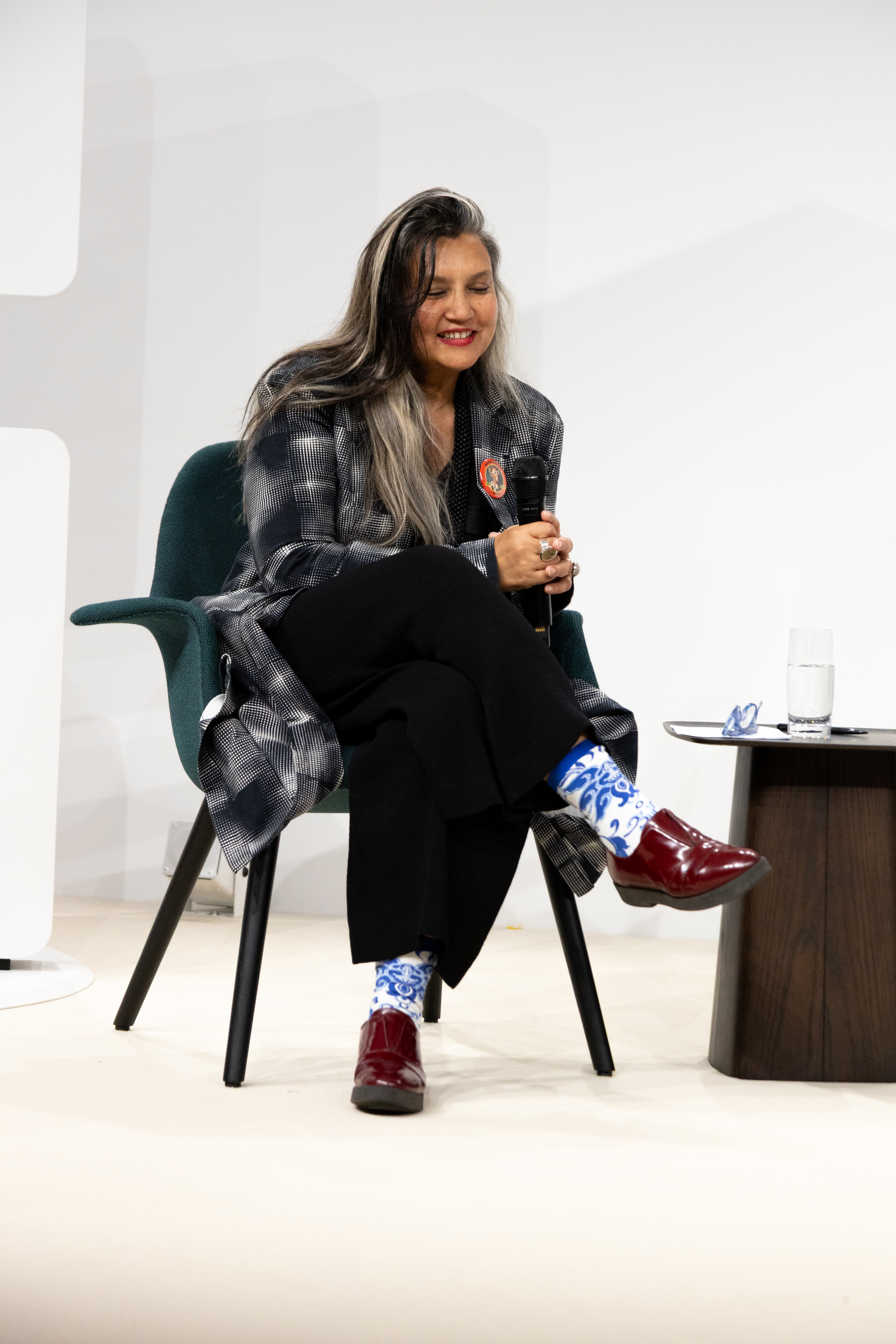
- Awards: Tatler Most Influential Hong Kong (2022); Tatler Most Influential Hong Kong (2021)

Suhanya Raffel is an Australian art historian who has been serving as the museum director of the M+ Museum for Visual Culture in Hong Kong. She joined the West Kowloon Cultural District Authority in November 2016 as executive director, M+, before being appointed Museum Director, M+, in January 2019. She succeeded Lars Nittve, who led the museum from 2011 to 2016.

== Career ==
Raffel was the Deputy Director of the Art Gallery of New South Wales, Sydney from 2013 to 2016 during which time she worked on the AGNSW expansion project with the architecture firm SANAA. From 1994-2013, she held senior curatorial positions at Queensland Art Gallery / Gallery of Modern Art, Brisbane, such as the Acting Director and Deputy Director of Curatorial. She helped drive the growth of the gallery from a regional museum to a global museum with an outstanding collection of contemporary Asia-Pacific art and led multiple Asia Pacific Triennials of Contemporary Art (2002–2012).

Raffel was helped the production of major exhibitions including Andy Warhol in 2007-08, The China Project in 2009 and 6th Asia Pacific Triennial of Contemporary Art in 2009-10. Raffel also oversaw the implementation of Art, Love and Life: Ethel Carrick and E. Phillips Fox; 21st Century: Art in the First Decade; both Queensland Art Gallery initiatives; and Land, Sea and Sky: Contemporary Art of the Torres Strait Islands; a Queensland Art Gallery and Southbank Cultural Precinct partnership; Yayoi Kusama: Look Now, See Forever, was a Queensland Art Gallery initiative with the Kusama Studio in Tokyo; Matisse: Drawing Life, co-organised with Art Exhibitions Australia and the Bibliothèque Nationale de France, Paris; Portrait of Spain: Masterpieces from the Prado was co-organised with Art Exhibitions Australia and the Museo Nacional del Prado, Madrid, and the forthcoming 7th Asia Pacific Triennial of Contemporary Art, is a Queensland Art Gallery initiative.

== Other activities ==
- Geoffrey Bawa Trust, Member of the Board of Trustees
- Lunuganga Trust, Member of the Board of Trustees
- International Committee for Museums and Collections of Modern Art (CIMAM), President (since 2022)
- Solomon R. Guggenheim Museum, Member of the Asian Art Council (2009–2014)

In 2019, Raffel served on the jury that selected Samson Young for the first Sigg Prize for contemporary Chinese art. That same year, she was part of the selection committee that chose Brook Andrew as artistic director of the 22nd Biennale of Sydney.

== Recognition ==
Raffel was awarded the title of Chevalier in the Order des Arts et des Lettres by the French government in 2020.
