= Rashaad Newsome =

American visual artist (born 1979)

- Born: 1979 (age 46–47); New Orleans, Louisiana, U.S.
- Education: Tulane University (BA) The University of Connecticut (Dr. hc)

Rashaad Newsome (born 1979) is an American artist working at the intersection of technology, collage, sculpture, video, music, and performance. He lives and works in Oakland, California and Brooklyn, New York.

== Education ==
Rashaad Newsome holds a 2023 honorary Doctorate Degree in Fine Arts from the University of Connecticut in Storrs, Connecticut, a B.F.A. in art history from Tulane University (2001) in New Orleans, and a certificate of study in digital post production from Film/Video Arts Inc, New York (2004). In 2005 he studied MAX/MSP programming at Harvestworks Digital Media Art Center in New York.

== Career ==
His work has been exhibited, screened, and performed in galleries, museums, institutions, and festivals throughout the world including the Park Avenue Armory in Manhattan, the Studio Museum in Harlem, New York; the National Museum of African American History and Culture, Washington, D.C.; The Whitney Museum of American Art, New York; Brooklyn Museum, New York; MoMA PS1, Queens, New York; SFMOMA, San Francisco; New Orleans Museum of Art, New Orleans; Centre Georges Pompidou, Paris; the Garage Center of Contemporary Culture, Moscow; and MUSA, Vienna. Newsome's work is in numerous public and private collections including the Studio Museum; The Whitney Museum of American Art, the Brooklyn Museum, the San Francisco Museum of Modern Art, Los Angeles County Museum of Art, Los Angeles; McNay Art Museum, San Antonio, Texas; Virginia Museum of Fine Arts; Richmond, Virginia; The Chazen Museum of Art, Madison, Wisconsin; National Museum of African American History and Culture, and the New Britain Museum of American Art in New Britain, Connecticut. In 2010 he participated in the Whitney Biennial in New York, and in 2011 Greater New York at MoMA PS1, New York.

In addition to being in art, Newsome runs a production company, Rashaad Newsome Studio.

In 2019, with a LACMA Art + Technology Lab's Grant, Newsome created the first generation of his Artificial Intelligence, Being 1.0, which functioned as a critical tour guide to his 2020 exhibition To Be Real at Fort Mason Center for Art and Culture, in San Francisco.

Since that time, Newsome has been in residence at The Stanford Institute for Human-Centered Artificial Intelligence.

=== Selected images ===
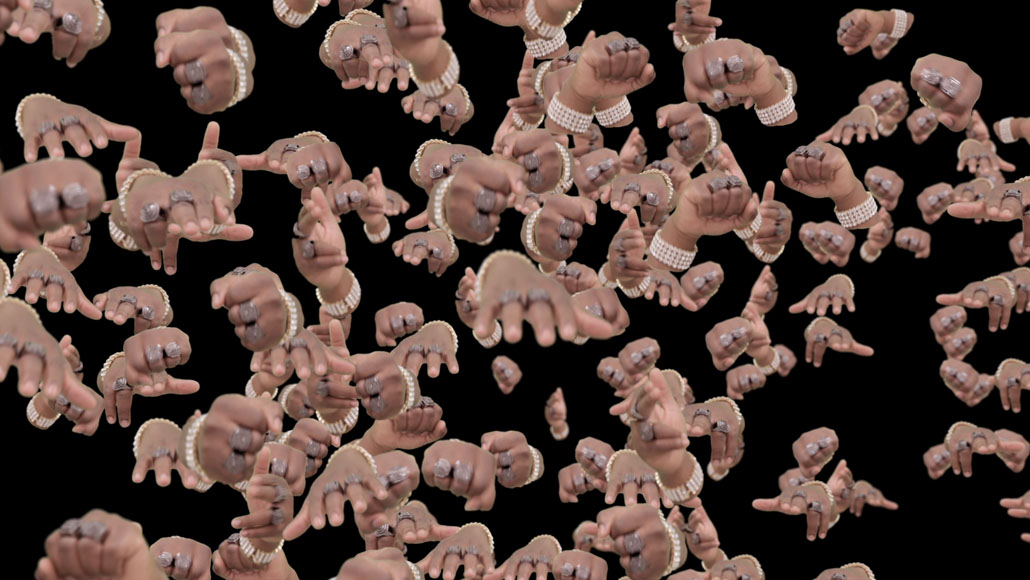

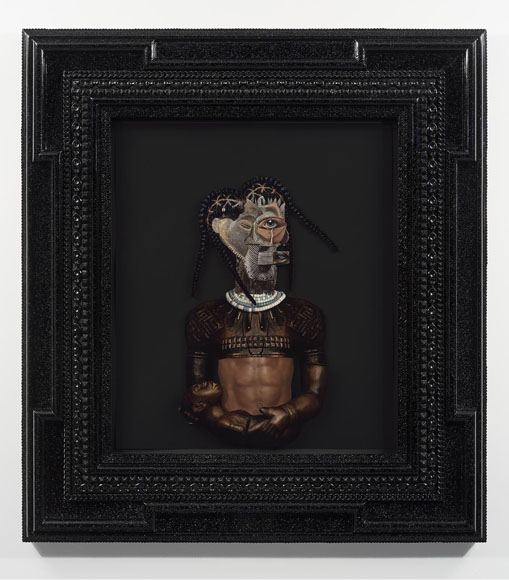

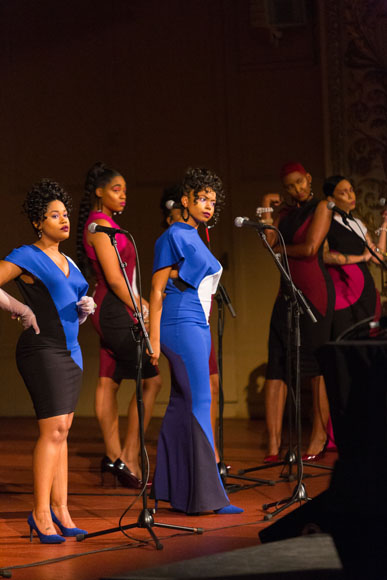

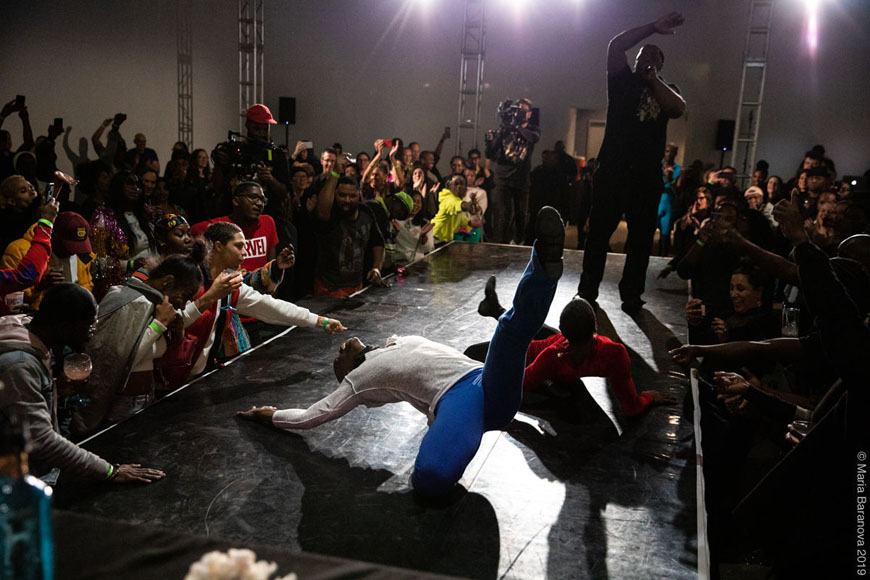

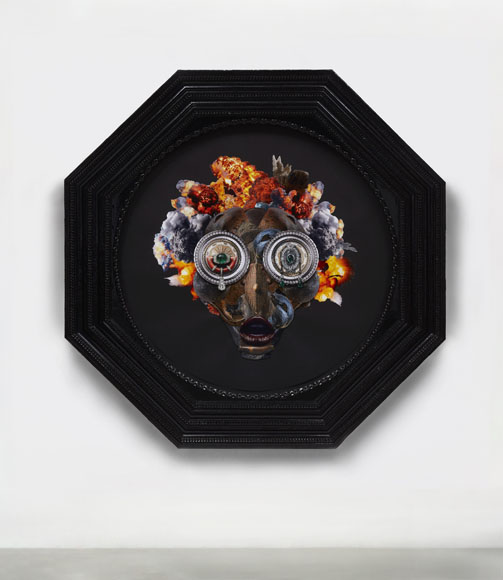

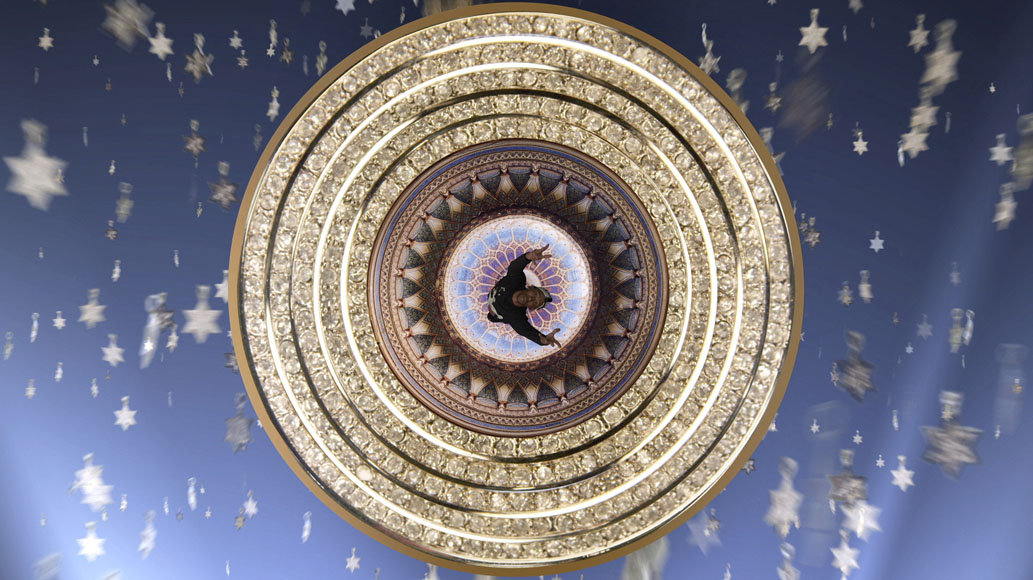

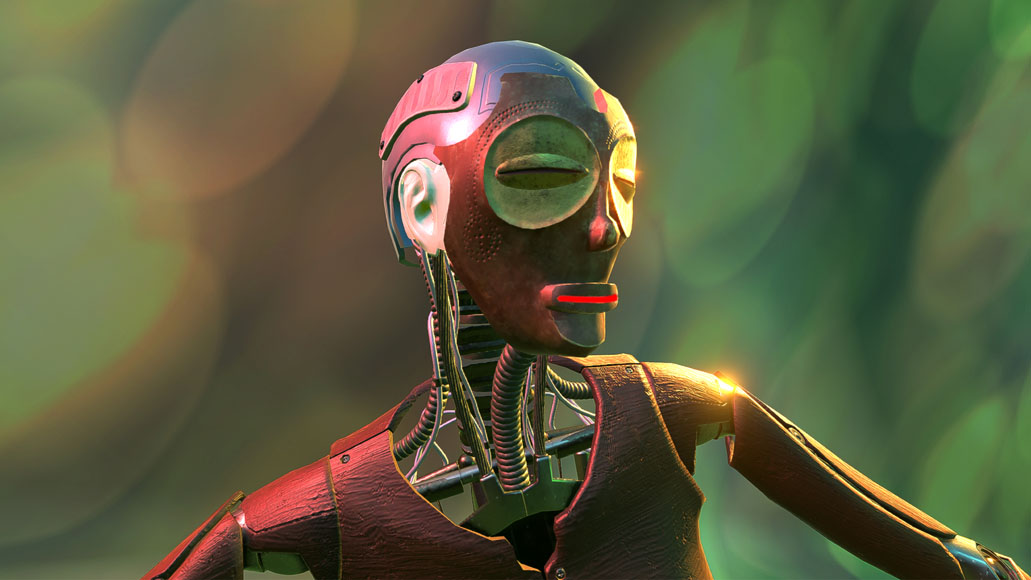

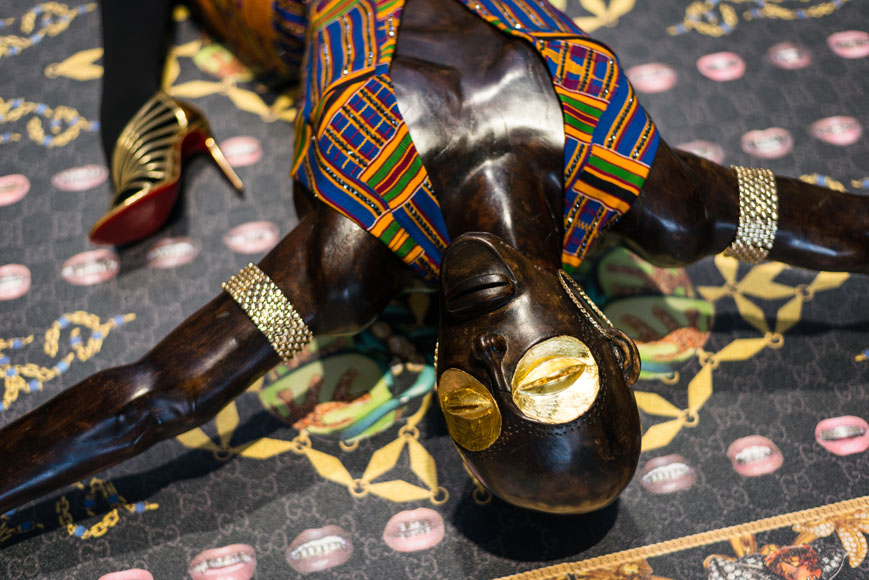

== Awards ==
2021

- Knight Arts + Tech Fellowship, Knight Foundation

2020

- Artist Residency, Stanford Institute for Human-Centered Artificial Intelligence
- Rapid Response Fellowship, Eyebeam

2019

- Art + Technology Lab Grant, LACMA
- MediaMaker Fellowship, BAVC

2018

- William Penn Foundation Grant
- Live Feed Creative Residency, New York Live Arts

2017

- Pollock-Krasner Foundation Grant
- Gold Rush Award, Rush Arts

2016

- Artist Residency at the Tamarind Institute, New Mexico

2014

- Visiting Artist Residency, Headlands Center for the Arts

2011

- Louis Comfort Tiffany Foundation Award

2010

- Urban Artist Initiative Individual Artist Grant

2009

- Rema Hort Mann Foundation Visual Arts Grant

== Selected exhibitions ==
=== Solo exhibitions ===
2022

- Assembly, Park Avenue Armory Drill Hall, New York, New York

2020

- Black Magic, Leslie-Lohman Museum, New York, New York
- To Be Real, Fort Mason Center for Art & Culture, San Francisco

2019

- ICON/STOP PLAYING IN MY FACE!, Museum of the African Diaspora, San Francisco

2017

- Reclaiming Our Time, Debuck Gallery, New York, New York
- Mélange, Contemporary Arts Center, New Orleans, Louisiana

2016

- STOP PLAYING IN MY FACE!, DeBuck Gallery, New York, New York
- THIS IS WHAT I WANT TO SEE, Studio Museum in Harlem, New York

2015

- Order of Chivalry, Savannah College of Art and Design, Savannah, Georgia
- Silence Please The Show Is About To Begin, Art Gallery of York University, Toronto

2014

- LS.S, Marlborough Gallery, New York, New York
- FIVE, The Drawing Center, New York, New York

2013

- King of Arms, New Orleans Museum of Art, New Orleans

2011

- Herald, Marlborough Chelsea, New York, New York
- Rashaad Newsome/MATRIX 161, Wadsworth Atheneum Museum of Art, Hartford, Connecticut

2010

- Honorable Ordinaries, Ramis Barquet Gallery, New York, New York
- Futuro, ar/ge Kunst Galerie Museum, Bolzano, Italy

2009

- Standards, Ramis Barquet Gallery, New York, New York

=== Group exhibitions ===
2022

- In the Black Fantastic, Hayward Gallery, London

2021

- The Dirty South: Contemporary Art, Material Culture, and the Sonic Impulse, Virginia Museum of Fine Arts, Richmond, Virginia

2020

- Mothership: Voyage into Afrofuturism, Oakland Museum of California, Oakland, California
- After La vida nueva, Artists Space, New York, New York

2019

- Elements of Vogue, El Museo Universitario del Chopo, Mexico City
- Radical Love, Ford Foundation Gallery, New York, New York

2018

- Something to Say, McNay Art Museum, San Antonio, Texas

2017

- Elements of Vogue, Centro de Arte Dos de Mayo, Madrid, Spain
- Public Movement, Moderna Museet Malmö, Malmö, Sweden

2015

- A Curious Blindness, Columbia University, New York, New York

2014

- Killer Heels, Brooklyn Museum, New York, New York
- Black Eye, New York, New York

2013

- Goddess Clap Back: Hip Hop Feminism in Art, CUE Art Foundation, New York, New York

2012

- It’s Time to Dance Now, Centre national d'Art et de Culture Georges Pompidou, Paris
- Stage Presence: Theatricality in Art and Media, SFMOMA, San Francisco
- The Bearden Project, the Studio Museum in Harlem, New York, New York

2011

- Beauty Contest, Austrian Cultural Forum, New York, New York, United States / MUSA, Vienna, Austria
- Venice Biennale: "Commercial Break", Garage Projects, Venice, Italy

2010

- Free, The New Museum of Contemporary Art, New York, New York
- Greater New York, MoMA PS1, Long Island City, New York
- Whitney Biennial, New York, New York
- Prospect 1.5, Good Children Gallery, New Orleans

== Bibliography ==
- Weiyi Chang (2020); Sofa Jamal, Colleen O’Connor, and Patricio Orellana, After La vida Nueva, exhibition catalogue, Artists Space, New York
- Jasmine Wahi (2020); To Be Real, exhibition catalogue, PPAC & Fort Mason Center for Arts & Culture in San Francisco
- Manuel Segade Lodeiro, Sabel Gavaldon (2019); Elements of Vogue: un caso de estudio de performance radical; Comunidad de Madrid; Publicaciones Oficiales
- Alok Vaid-Menon (2017); Reclaiming Our Time, exhibition catalogue, De Buck Gallery
- (2014) Killer Heels, exhibition catalogue, Brooklyn Museum
- Doris Zhao, Amanda Hunt (2016); This is What I Want to See!, exhibition catalogue, the Studio Museum in Harlem
- Darnell L. Moore, Jasmine Wahi (2016); Stop Playing in my Face!, exhibition catalogue, De Buck Gallery
- Veronica Sekules (2014); L.egends S.tatements S.tars, exhibition catalogue, Marlborough Gallery
- Kleinberg Romanow, Evan Garza (2014); FIVE, exhibition catalogue, The Drawing Center
- Amani Olu (2011); Herald, exhibition catalogue, Marlborough Gallery
- Luigi Fassi (2010); Greater New York, exhibition catalogue, MoMA PS1
- (2010) Whitney Biennial, exhibition catalogue, Whitney Museum of American Art
