= Ikko Yokoyama =

Japanese curator and writer

- Born: Japan
- Occupations: Curator, writer
- Employers: International Confederation of Architectural Museums; Konstfack; M+

Ikko Yokoyama is a Japanese museum curator and writer whose fields of interest are architecture, design, and craft.

== Biography ==
Ikko Yokoyama is the lead curator of design and architecture at the M+ museum in Hong Kong, a position she has held since 2016. Previously she was the head of exhibitions at Konstfack University College of Arts, Crafts and Design in Stockholm.

Yokoyama is a member of the Executive Committee of the International Confederation of Architectural Museums, and a member of an advisory panel of Centre for Heritage, Arts and Textile in Hong Kong. She serves on board of directors of the Charlottenborg Foundation, and has also been a member of board of the Moderna Museet in Stockholm since 2008.

In 2021, Yokoyama stated the following about the relationship between architecture and museum exhibitions:

By bringing architecture into the context of a museum, we offer different ways of looking to help widen appreciation, but also encourage visitors to learn about its tragedies and historical consequences.

Her curatorial work has included exhibitions such as The Fab Mind at 21_21 Design Sight, Tokyo. She has also curated exhibitions for the Liljevalchs konsthall, IASPIS, and the Swedish Embassy in Tokyo.

She in an expert on Nordic craft and design. She has written a book about the Swedish ceramicist Lisa Larson (in collaboration with the artist's daughter), and has contributed to books about the M+ museum and periodicals such as AXIS, Casa BRUTUS, Elle Décor, Esquire, form (Zeitschrift), Pen, and Studio Voice.

== Publications ==
Yokoyama has written or co-edited the following books:

- Yokoyama, Ikko; Larson, Johanna (2014). Lisa Larson. Japan: Jitsugyo no Nihon Sha. p. 166. ISBN 9784408420622.
- Chong, Doryun; Suhanya, Raffel; Yokoyama, Ikko; Masters, H. G.; Yao, Pauline J. (2021). The Making of M+. London: Thames & Hudson. p. 720. ISBN 978-050-0024-35-5.
- Chong, Doryun; Ma, Lesley; Yao, Pauline J.; Yokoyama, Ikko (2022). M+ Collections Highlights. London: Thames & Hudson. p. 540. ISBN 978-050-0024-36-2.
