= Lars Nittve =

Swedish museum director (born 1953)

- Born: 17 September 1953 (age 72); Stockholm, Sweden
- Education: Stockholm School of Economics; M.A., Stockholm University
- Known for: Executive Director, M+, West Kowloon Cultural District Authority, Hong Kong (2011–2016); Director of Moderna Museet, Stockholm (2001–2010); Director of Tate Modern, London (1998–2001)
- Awards: PhD, HC, Umeå University, Sweden (2009); H.M The King's Medal in Gold, 12th size in the Order of the Serafim's Ribbon (2010); Swedish Manager of the Year Honorary Award (2002); City of Malmö Grand Culture Award (2009); Bridge of Culture Denmark-Sweden Award (1997)

Lars Nittve (born 17 September 1953) is a Swedish museum director, curator, art critic and writer. He was the founding Director of Tate Modern in London; former Director of the Moderna Museet in Stockholm; the founding Director of Rooseum – Center for Contemporary Art – in Malmö, Sweden; and Director of the Louisiana Museum of Modern Art in Humlebaek, Denmark.

Nittve was the Founding Director of M+, museum for visual culture of West Kowloon Cultural District in Hong Kong, which opened to the public in 2021.

== Early life and education ==
Lars Nittve was born in Stockholm in 1953. He studied at the Stockholm School of Economics, and obtained an M.A. at Stockholm University. He also pursued postgraduate studies at New York University. In 2009, Nittve earned a PhD, HC, from the Umeå University, Umeå, Sweden.

== Career ==
In 1978 to 1985, Nittve served as lecturer in art history at the Stockholm University. During the same period he has been Senior art critic for the Swedish daily newspaper Svenska Dagbladet, Stockholm, and contributed regularly to Artforum, New York City.

From 1986 Nittve was appointed Chief Curator at the Moderna Museet in Stockholm, where he curated a large number of high-profile exhibitions – both monographic and thematic, among them "Walter De Maria", "Kandinsky and Sweden", "Hilma af Klint" and the seminal "Implosion – a Postmodern Perspective". From 1990 to 1995, he served as the founding Director of Rooseum – Center for Contemporary Art – in Malmö, Sweden, where he organized the whole exhibition program, including surveys of "Susan Rothenberg", "Allan McCollum", "Sherrie Levine" and "Andreas Gursky". In July 1995, Nittve became Director of the Louisiana Museum of Modern Art in Humlebaek, Denmark, where he also curated the groundbreaking exhibition "Sunshine & Noir – Art in L.A. 1960–1997". In the spring of 1998, he was named the first Director of Tate Modern, London, which opened in May 2000 to great acclaim.

In 2001, he took up his post as Director of Moderna Museet, the national Museum of Modern Art in Stockholm. He co-curated the thematic exhibition Fashination in 2004 about the dialogue between art and fashion in the last ten years. Other exhibitions include "Time and Place: Los Angeles 1957–1968" (2008); "Anthony McCall" (2009) and most recently "Ed Ruscha: Fifty Years of Painting" (2010). During his time at the Moderna Museet, Nittve was instrumental in the fundraising effort (70 million USD) that strengthened the collection and oversaw the expansion of the institution – including The Second Museum of Our Wishes, which focuses on bringing more works by women artists into the collection, the creation of the innovative Renzo Piano designed Pontus Hultén Study Gallery (opened in May 2008), The American Friends of the Moderna Museet Inc. and the opening of Moderna Museet Malmö in 2009.

At the end of 2010, Nittve left his post as Director of the Moderna Museet after having served the maximum length of nine years anyone is permitted to hold the post.

From 2011–2016, Nittve was Founding Director of the M+ museum in the West Kowloon Cultural District in Hong Kong.

In 2016 he established Nittve Information Ltd, based in the mountain resort of Åre, Sweden, acting as an independent writer and advisor to museums and foundations worldwide. Since 2021 has his main professional engagement been as Partner and Chair of the Investment Committee of the investment fund Arte Collectum.

== Awards and recognition ==
Lars Nittve has served on the jury of numerous international prizes and has been on the board of a large number of international art organizations. He is a member of the Royal Swedish Academy of Fine Art.

In 2009 he was awarded a PhD H.C by Umeå University, Sweden, where he also was professor in Art history 2010-2016.

In 2010, Nittve was awarded H. M. The King's Medal in gold, 12th size in the Order of the Serafim's ribbon.

Nittve is the author of several publications on art, as well as articles in journals and catalogues in Sweden and abroad.

In 2013 named by Le Nouvel Observateur one of ”The Fifty who Change the World”.
