= M+ =

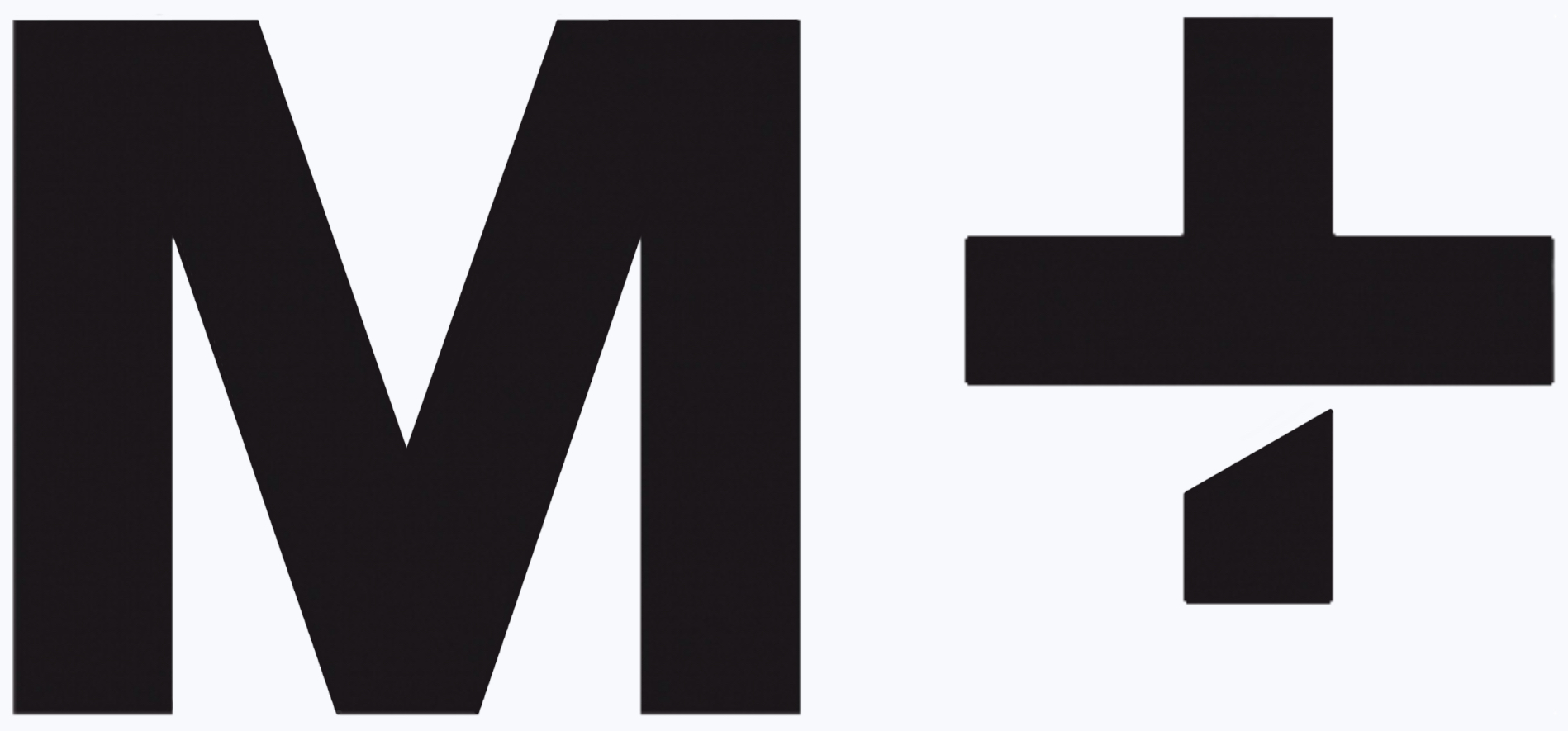

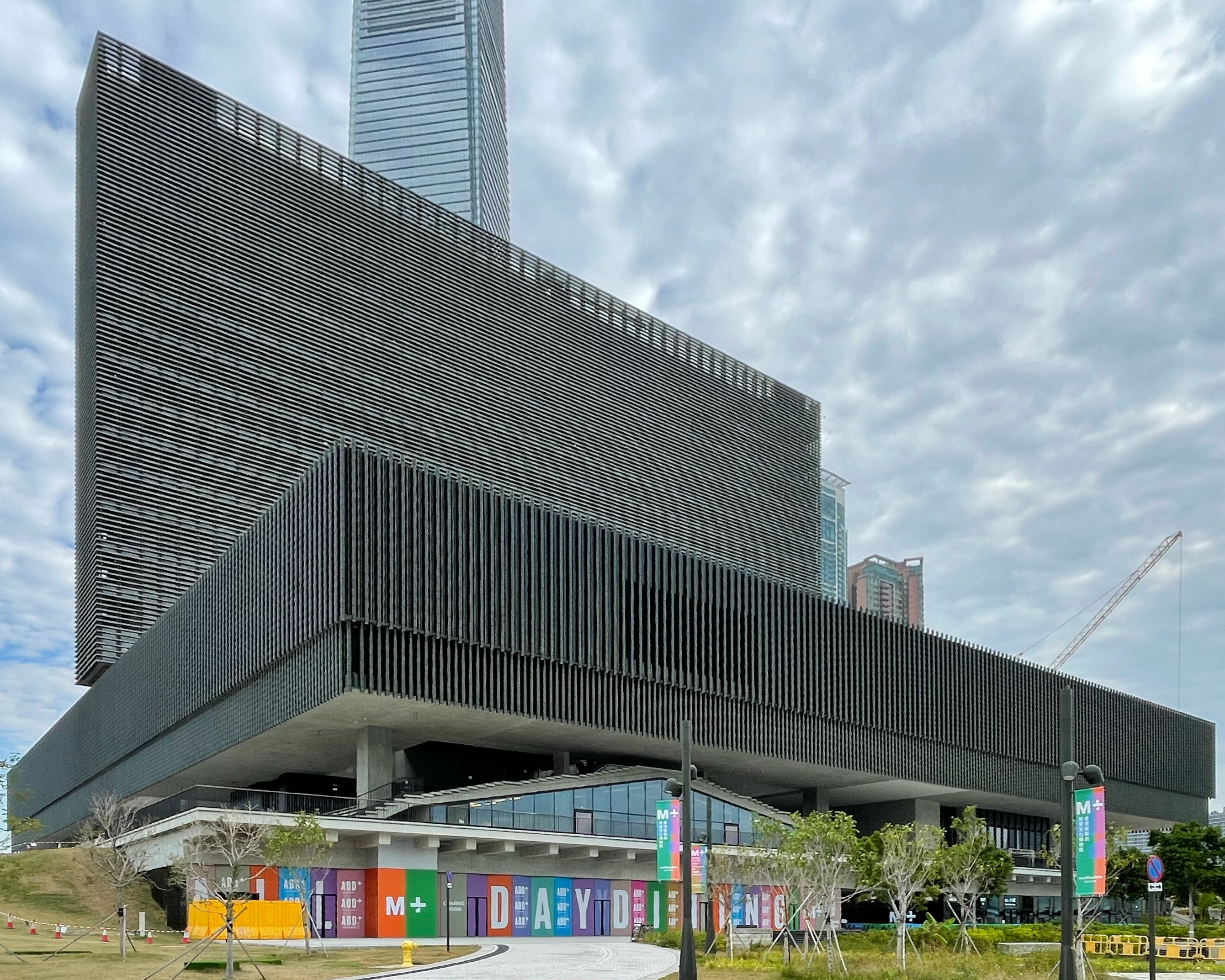
- M+, West Kowloon, Hong Kong
- Established: 11 November 2021
- Location: 38 Museum Drive, West Kowloon Cultural District, Hong Kong
- Coordinates: 22.300958°N 114.159645°E
- Type: Art museum
- Collection size: 6,421+ (2021)
- Visitors: 2,612,691 (2024)
- Director: Suhanya Raffel
- Curators: Doryun Chong (Chief Curator), Ulanda Blair, Olivia Chow, Stella Fong, Lesley Ma, Tina Pang, Pi Li, Silke Schmickl, Shirley Surya, Isabella Tam, Pauline J. Yao, Ikko Yokoyama (design and architecture)
- Owner: West Kowloon Cultural District Authority
- Website: mplus.org.hk

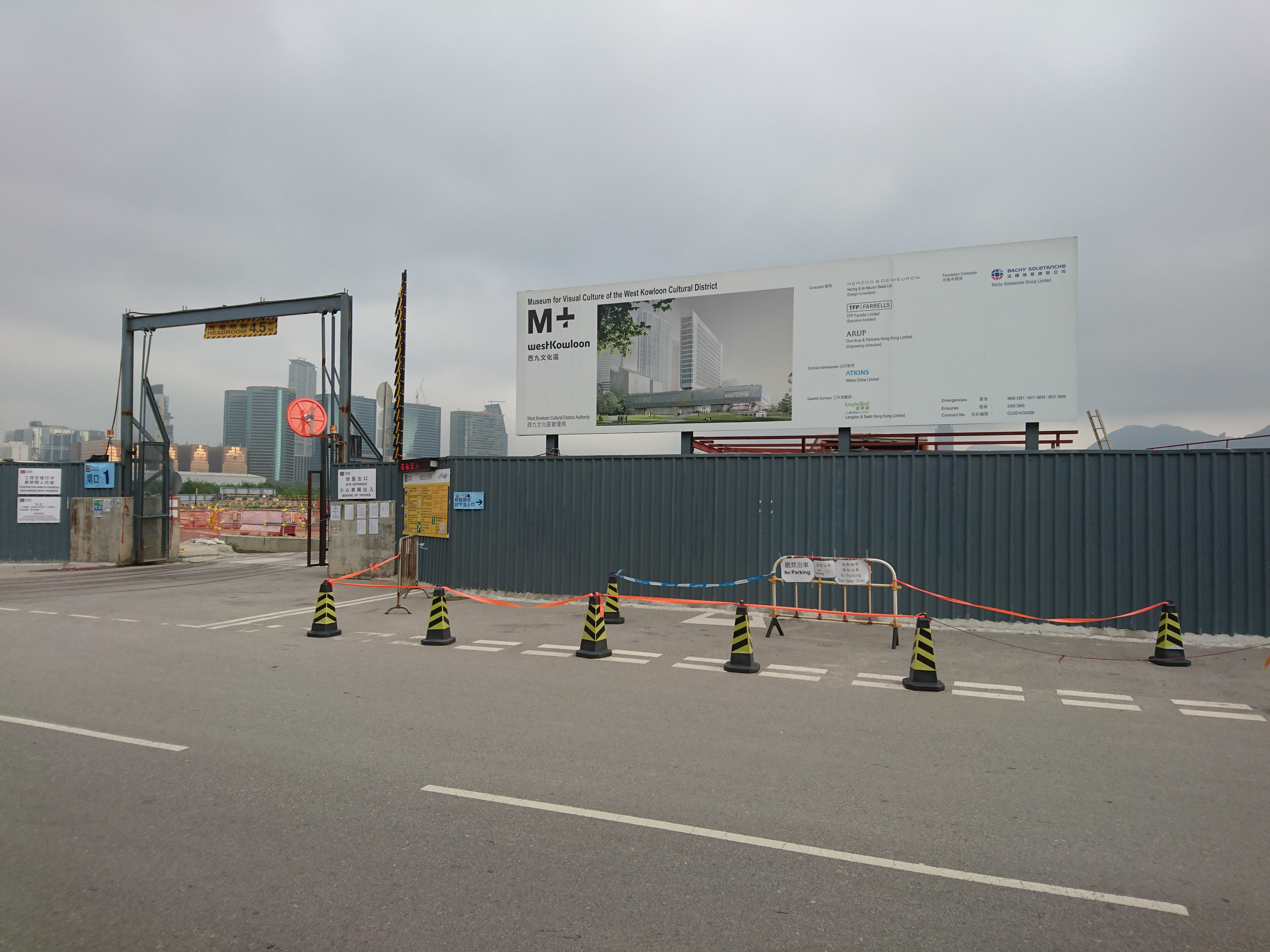
Construction site in December 2015

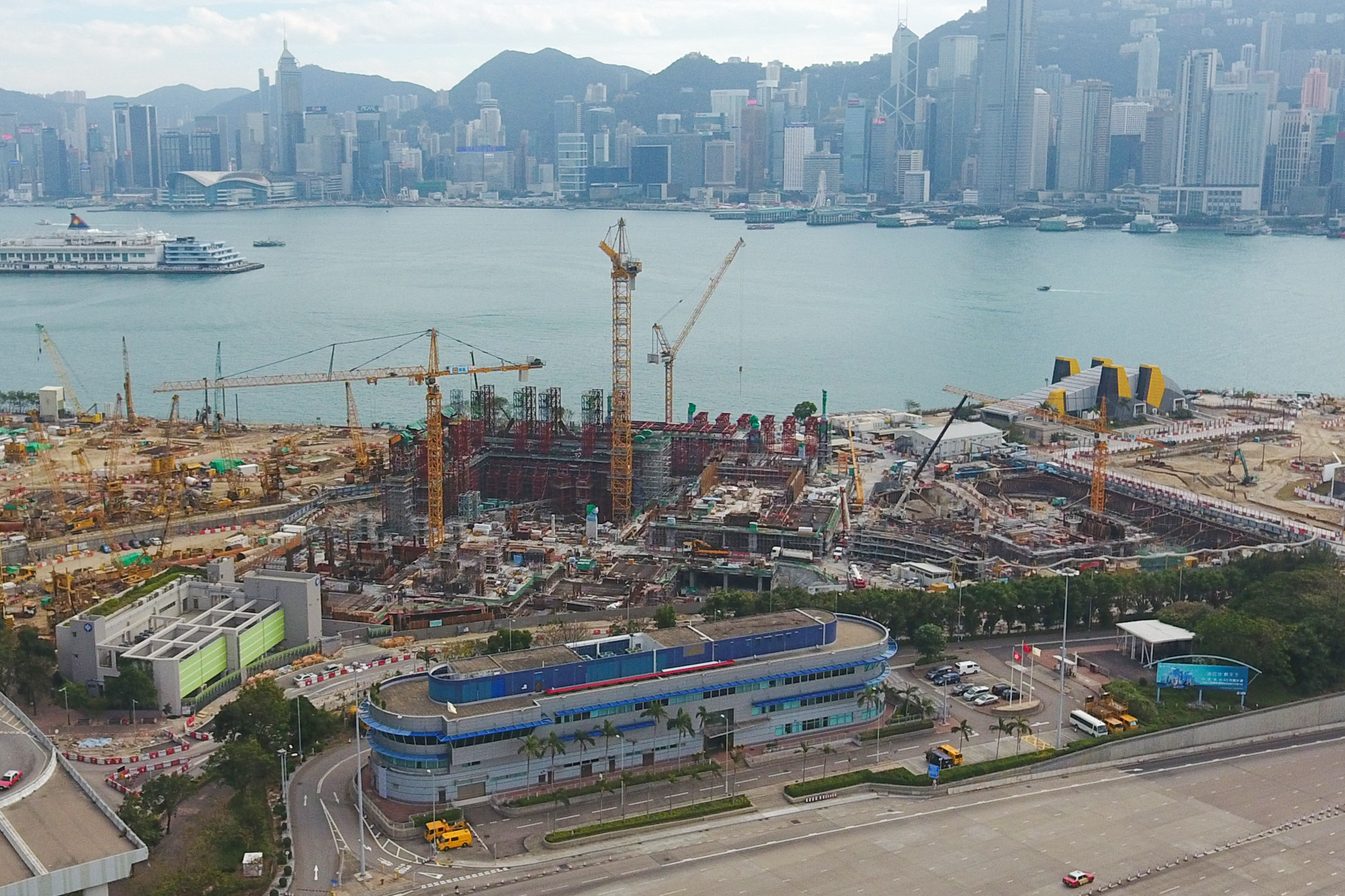
Construction site in February 2017

M+ is an art museum located in the West Kowloon Cultural District of Hong Kong. It exhibits twentieth- and twenty-first-century art encompassing visual art, design and architecture, and moving image. It opened on 12 November 2021.

== Focus ==
The M+ Collections focus on twentieth- and twenty-first-century visual culture, encompassing the disciplines of design and architecture, moving image, and visual art, and the thematic area of Hong Kong visual culture. The museum is intended to rival the Tate Modern, New York's MoMA and the Centre Pompidou in terms of the breadth and importance of its collections. The HK$5.9 billion institution has been led by Museum Director Suhanya Raffel since January 2019 and administered by the West Kowloon Cultural District Authority (WKCDA). A separate subsidiary company will be set up in the future with the aim of ensuring its "independence and efficiency".

The inaugural director, Lars Nittve, explained that the name was drawn from the concept of being a "museum and more", and that his team sought to move beyond the typical model of the art museum, for example, by serving as a showcase of diverse subjects like architecture, film, and all manner of moving images including animation and video games.

== Building design ==
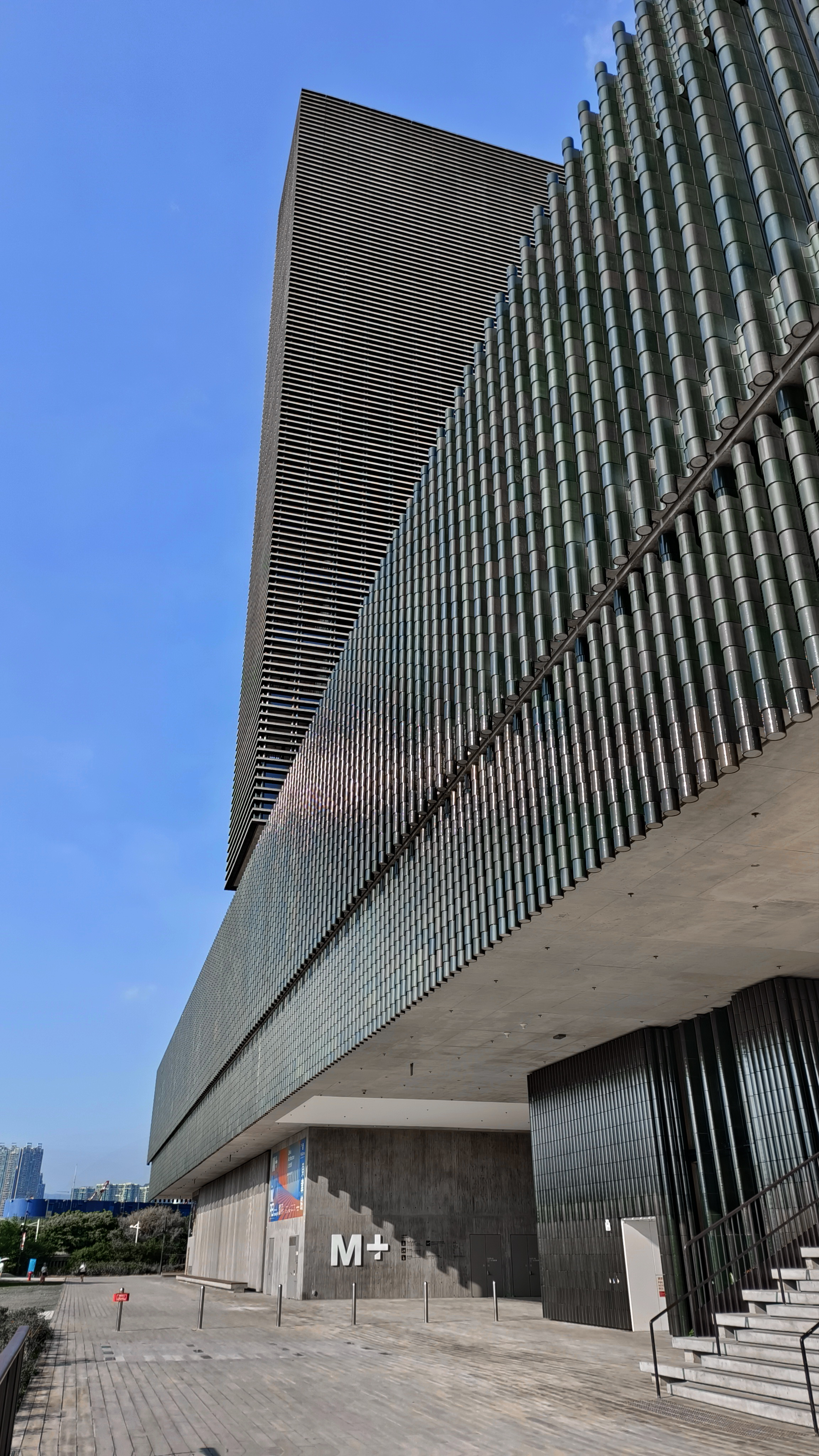
M+

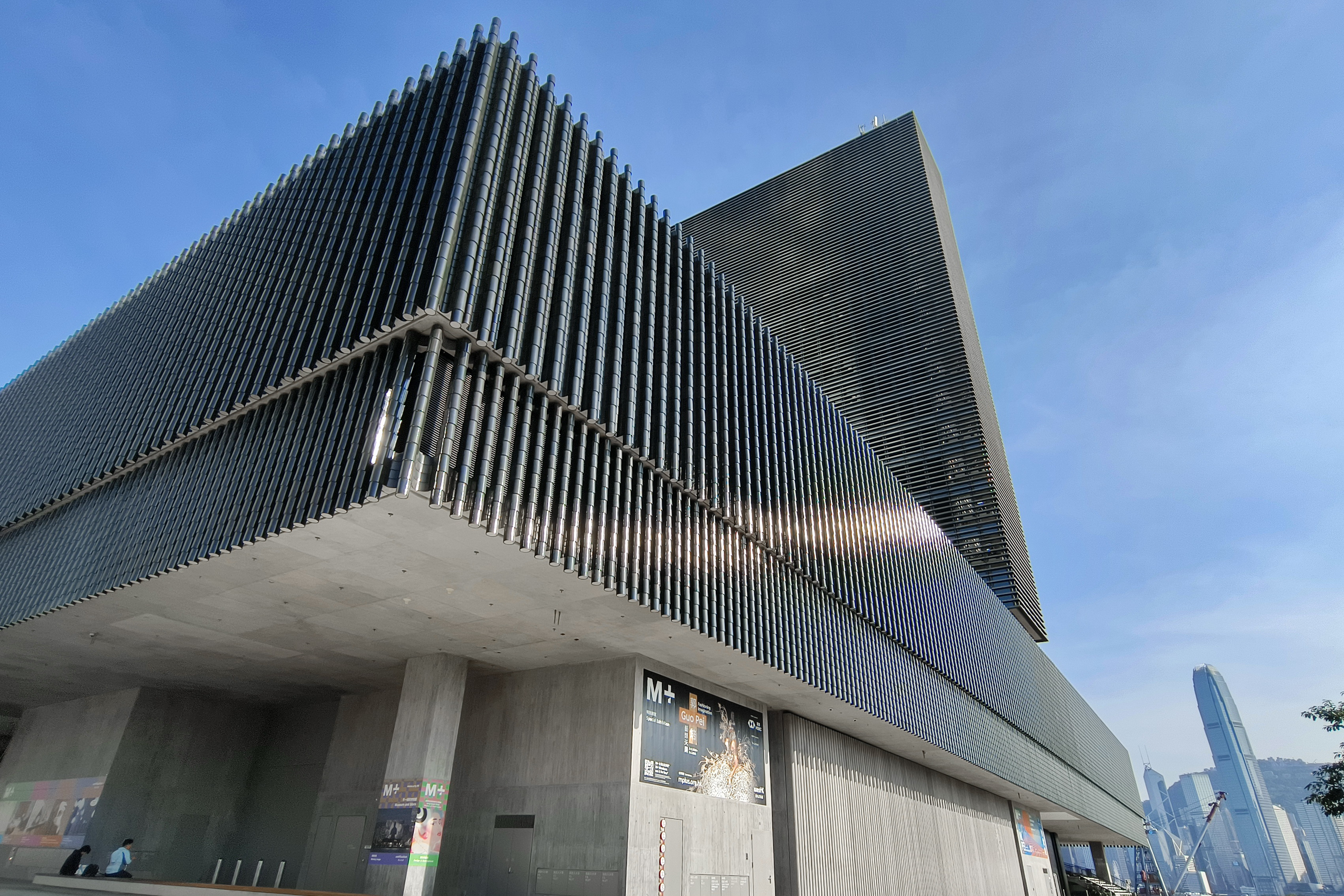
M+

After an architectural competition, six finalists for the design of the M+ museum were announced in 2012, namely Herzog & de Meuron and Farrells, Kazuyo Sejima and Ryue Nishizawa (SANAA), Renzo Piano Building Workshop, Shigeru Ban and Thomas Chow Architects, Snøhetta, and Toyo Ito and Benoy. Each team was compensated with HK$1 million. The winning design, by Herzog & de Meuron and Farrells, was announced by the WKCDA in June 2013. As part of the Masterplan for the West Kowloon Cultural District designed by Foster + Partners, the architects proposed incorporating the use of underground "found space", referring to the space surrounding the Airport Railway tunnels running directly beneath the site, as a "radical" subterranean exhibition and performance area.

The building's design has the basic appearance of an upside-down T. The main horizontal slab housing exhibition spaces is lifted off the ground, permitting pedestrian circulation underneath. Above, a tower houses "public restaurants, lounges and gardens" along with offices and research facilities. Of the structure's total 700,000 square feet (65,000 m^{2}), plans call to reserve 185,000 square feet (17,200 m^{2}) for exhibitions, only slightly more than MoMA. In addition to the interior space, an LED lighting display system is integrated into the facade, serving as a gigantic screen for works of art, visible across Victoria Harbour.

Construction of the museum began in 2014. A time capsule containing artwork of local schoolchildren, to be unsealed 100 years later, was laid on the site in 2015. The museum building was completed in December 2020, with the occupation permit obtained on 24 December 2020.

== Collection ==
In keeping with its mission, the M+ Collections comprise a broad spectrum of media by international artists, including "sketches, electronic media, installation, objects, painting, photography, architectural models, printed matter, sculpture and time-based intangibles."

On 12 June 2012, Uli Sigg, a Swiss collector of the reportedly largest and most comprehensive collection of contemporary Chinese art in the world, announced that he would donate the majority of his holdings to M+. This founding acquisition included 1,463 donated works by 325 artists, "conservatively valued" at $1.3 billion Hong Kong dollars, in addition to a purchase from Sigg of a further 47 works for $177 million. Upon opening, the M+ Sigg collection will be presented "in isolation" within the museum building, and afterward displayed in the context of the overall collection. Sigg stated that he selected the Hong Kong museum over one in Mainland China because the collection includes works by artists suppressed by the Chinese government, for example 26 pieces by Ai Weiwei. In the same vein, the museum has acquired almost 100 photos of Liu Heung Shing's "China After Mao" series, including photos of the bloody aftermath of the 1989 Tiananmen Square protests and massacre. Founding director Lars Nittve stated that, despite a warning from pro-Beijing Legislative Councillor Chan Kam-lam "not to mix art and politics", the museum would "not steer away" from politically sensitive issues.

In 2013, the museum announced that it had acquired the "most comprehensive collection [...] by a public institution" of the performance art of New York City-based Taiwanese artist Tehching Hsieh. As of 2013, the museum reported that it had acquired 800 works, with over 80% by "local artists and designers," including graffiti works by Tsang Tsou Choi (the so-called "King of Kowloon"), which were donated. By March 2014, the collection was reported to have grown to roughly 2,700 works. In 2021, the collection contains over 6,410 objects. Among the first non-Asian artists to be included in the collection is Candice Breitz.

In line with the M+ museum's aspirations to present a broad spectrum of artefacts from visual cultural realms outside of traditional visual art forms, the M+ collection also includes a number of architectural works, including works by Frank Lloyd Wright and Ludwig Mies van der Rohe, architectural models by Ma Yansong, an architectural model and visualisation works by WOHA and an entire sushi bar designed by Shiro Kuramata. In 2019, the museum acquired the entire archive of influential British architecture collective Archigram, despite purported attempts to block the sale to an overseas buyer. In 2022, the museum acquired the installation art work Sonic Rescue Ropes of Haegue Yang.

== Impact of national security law ==
In 2021, the museum came under fire from some pro-Beijing politicians and newspapers, who alleged that certain works in the museum's collection violated the Hong Kong national security law. These accusations were made against the backdrop of broader suppression of Hong Kong's arts sector by pro-government entities. After pro-Beijing politicians accused a piece by Ai Weiwei of "spreading hatred against China", the museum decided not to display the piece and also removed an image of the piece from its website. Ai criticised the decision, stating that M+ cannot achieve its ambition of becoming a world-class cultural facility if it is subject to such censorship.

In response to such concerns, West Kowloon Cultural District head Henry Tang said that the museum must comply with the law.

== Activities ==
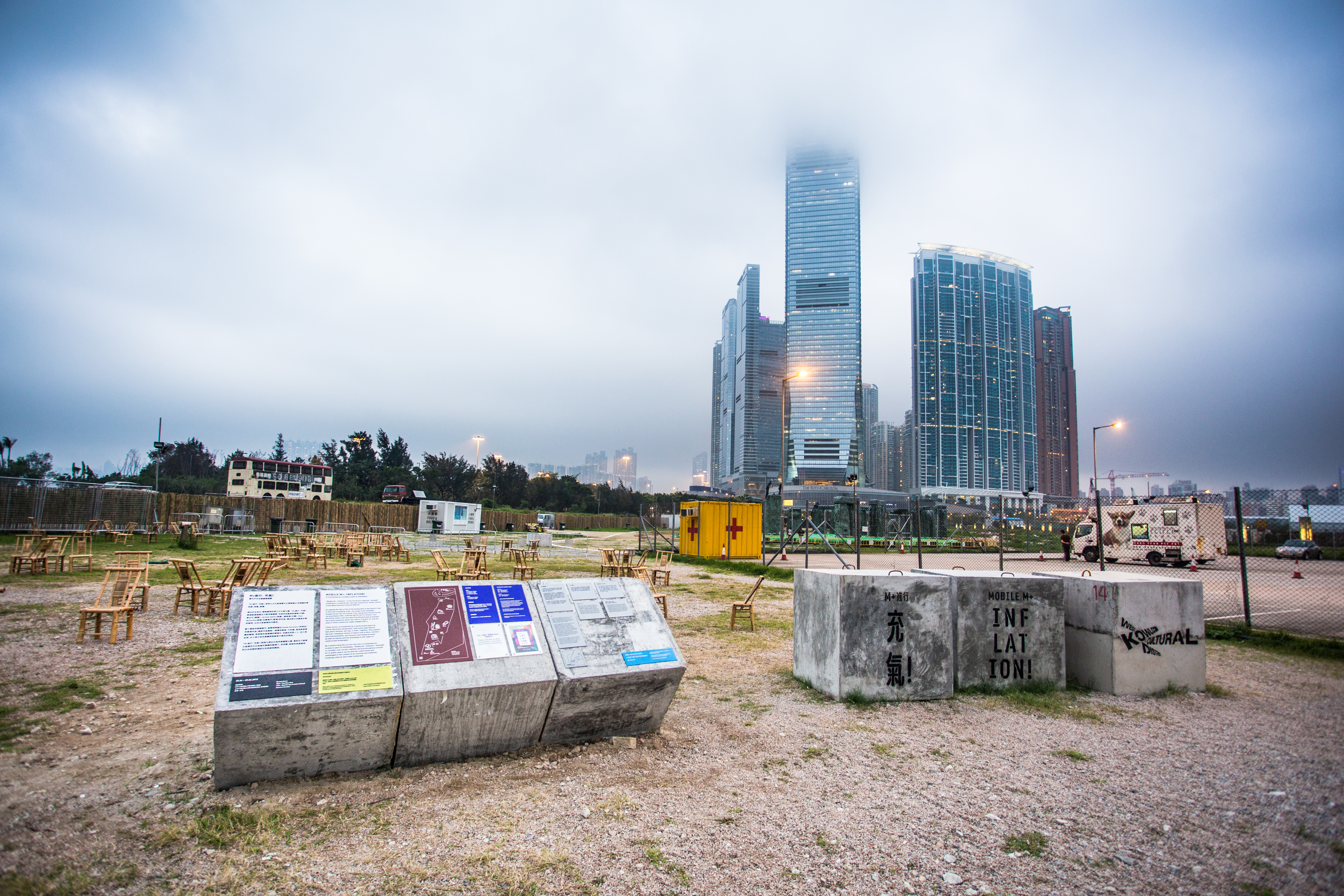
Temporary sculpture park

=== Pre-opening ===
Before the museum opened, nomadic exhibitions and projects were held throughout Hong Kong, including the "Mobile M+" programme. In 2012, the museum commissioned seven Hong Kong artists to create installation work scattered throughout Yau Ma Tei, an older district of Kowloon near the site of the future museum. In 2013, the museum commissioned a display of six large inflatable sculptures on the vacant lands of the future West Kowloon Cultural District.

In 2014, an online exhibition was held on Hong Kong's neon signage, an iconic feature of the city yet one which the museum noted is "fast disappearing". The website displays curated and commissioned written and visual submissions alongside photographs selected from more than 4,000 crowdsourced submissions. M+ also acquired, for its permanent collection, some neon signs that had been threatened with destruction.

"Building M+: The Museum and Architecture Collection" was a showcase of the museum's growing architecture collection, held from 10 January to 9 February 2014 at the ArtisTree gallery in Taikoo Place. At the time of the exhibition, the architecture collection comprised around 1,000 items, of which over 120 were displayed. The event also showcased the future design of the museum building, as well as the other five shortlisted entries from the architectural competition.

In late 2015, a live art programme and exhibition was presented, showcasing performance artists including John Cage, Patty Chang, and several local artists.

From 2016–2020, temporary exhibitions were held in the M+ Pavilion, a structure next to the M+ construction site.

=== Opening programme ===
When the museum opened on 12 November 2021, the opening displays consisted of six exhibitions curated from the M+ Collections:

- Hong Kong: Here and Beyond (G/F Main Hall Gallery) – Hong Kong's visual culture from the 1960s to the present
- M+ Sigg Collection: From Revolution to Globalisation (2/F Sigg Galleries) – a chronological survey of the development of contemporary Chinese art from the 1970s through the 2000s drawn from the M+ Sigg Collection
- Things, Spaces, Interactions (2/F East Galleries) – an exploration of international design and architecture over the last 70 years and their relevance to our lives today
- Individuals, Networks, Expressions (2/F South Galleries) – a narrative of post-war international visual art told from the perspective of Asia
- Antony Gormley: Asian Field (2/F West Gallery) – an installation of tens of thousands of clay figurines created by Antony Gormley together with over 300 villagers from a Guangdong village in five days in 2003
- The Dream of the Museum (2/F Courtyard Galleries) – a global constellation of conceptual art practices at the heart of M+’s unique Asian context

A special programme of live performances, talks, tours, workshops, screenings, and online events ran for three weekends following the opening.

== See also ==
- List of largest art museums
