= Rooseum =

Former art gallery in Malmö, Sweden

Coordinates: 55°36′16″N 13°00′34″E

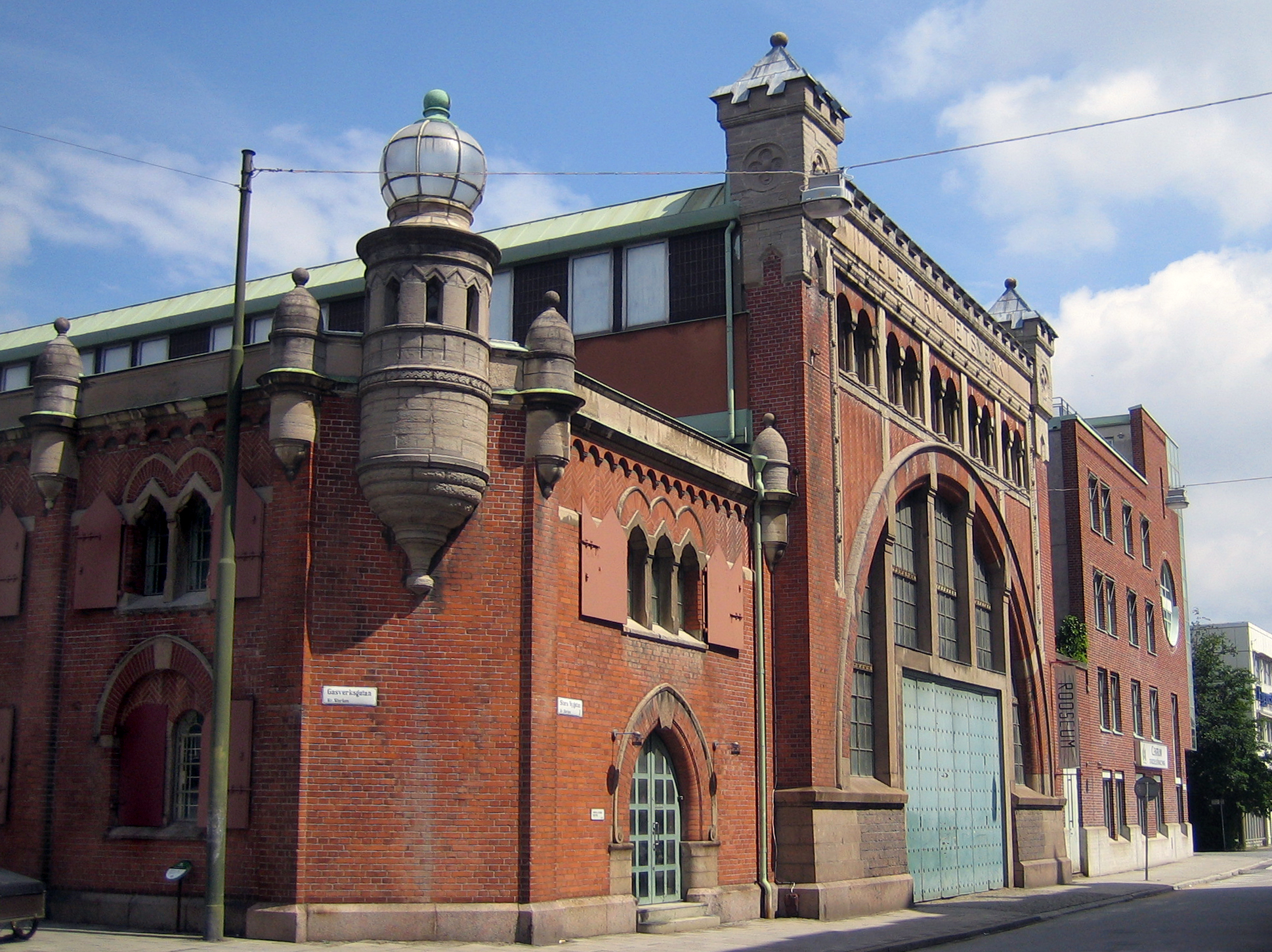
Rooseum

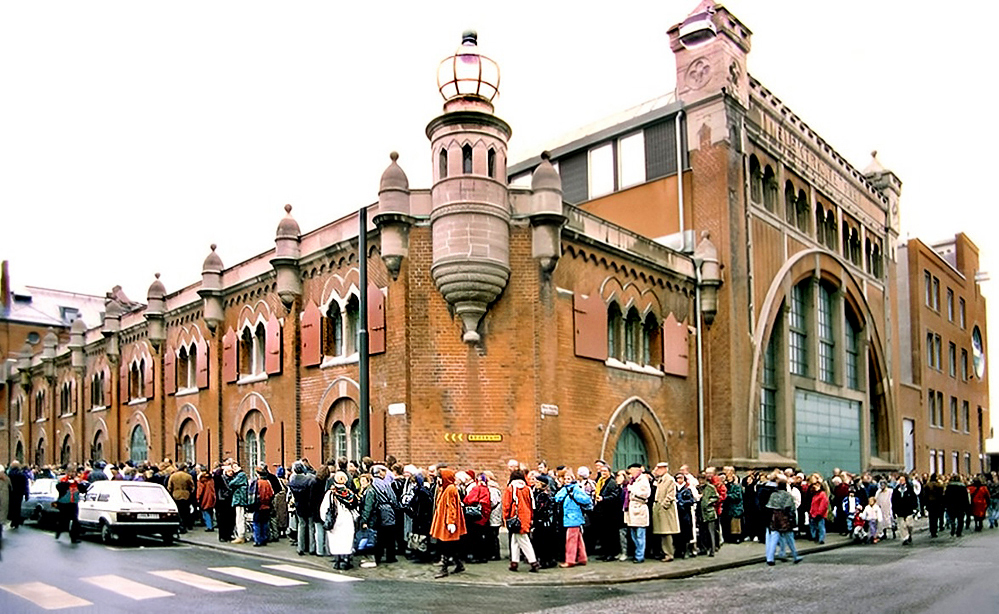
One of many long lines to the Pompeii exhibition. The exhibition was seen by ~145,000 people between November 1991 and February 1992.

The Rooseum Center for Contemporary Art was a formally private-owned (though publicly funded) centre for contemporary art located in Malmö, Sweden.

Founded in 1988 by the Swedish art collector and financier Fredrik Roos (1951–1991), Rooseum began as a traditional exhibition hall showing modern and contemporary art from the Nordic countries and internationally. Under the first director, Lars Nittve, it established an international reputation.

With the arrival of Charles Esche in 2000, Rooseum promoted more experimental relationships between art, artists and audience, by offering exhibitions and commissions linked to seminars, discussions and relevant screenings. It became one of the main sites of the artistic discussion around 'New institutionalism'. Rooseum, which was housed in a former power station built in 1900 at Gasverksgatan 22, closed in 2006.

The Museum of Modern Art in Stockholm (Moderna Museet) opened a satellite location, Moderna Museet Malmö, in the premises of the former Rooseum in 2009.

The Moderna Museet Malmö exhibits both its collection and temporary contemporary art exhibitions.
