= Guido Marzulli =

Italian painter (born 1943)

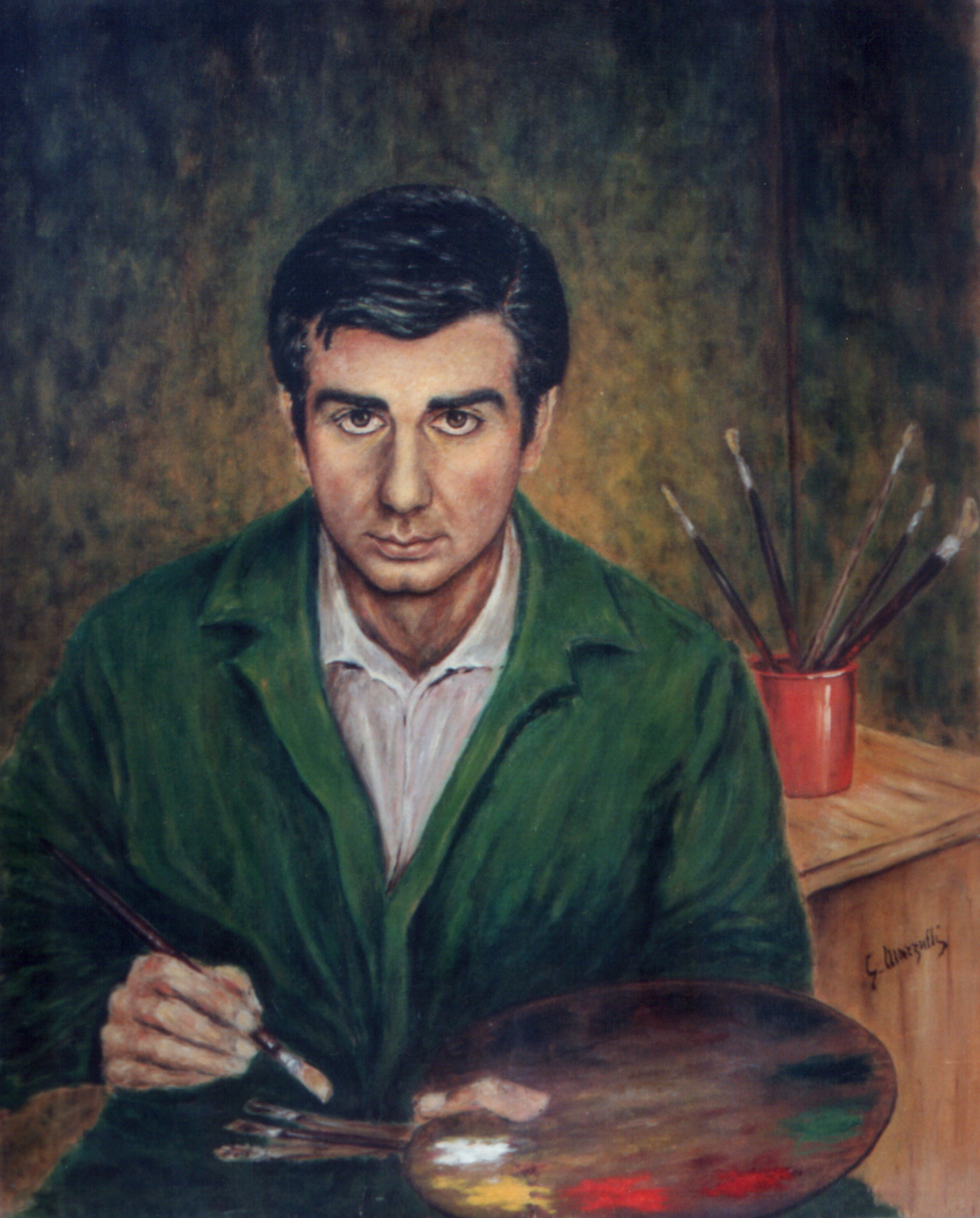
- Guido Marzulli - Self portrait - 1969
- Born: Guido Marzulli; 8 July 1943 (age 83); Bari, Italy
- Known for: Painting
- Movement: Realism, Figurative art

Guido Marzulli is a figurative Italian painter.

== Biography ==
Guido Marzulli was born in Bari, 8 July 1943.

His father – Michele Marzulli, who was also a poet and writer – and his mother, Rosa Tosches, were skilled painters.

He began his artistic activity in Bari, where he spent his adolescence and attended various meetings and debates with the most important scholars and Italian painters, who used to be part of the literary and artistic salon established in his parents' home during the 1960s.

Also in Bari, he finished his university studies and completed a degree in Economics.

In 1970, he moved to Rome, where he deepened his research on both landscape and portrait. During the same period, he travelled along Europe, broadening his knowledge to the greatest artists of antiquity and European masters from the nineteenth and beginning of the 20th century.

Since 1991, he has lived in Milan and continued painting also in his summer house in Santa Severa (Rome).

Marzulli originally set his work along the path traced by the naturalist Neapolitan tradition. He revisits it through the impressionist experience, interpreting it with strength and a 20th-century mark.

In the second half of the 1970s, he took a strong position against informal and conceptual art (as the Transavantgarde movement did in the late 1970s and 1980').

He rejected abstract art and focused on figurative painting, receiving awards and acknowledgements, including the Gold Medal at the Biennale of Rome G.Tortelli in 1990.

Marzulli knew well the concept of Modern Art, but he chose to keep his work in a more traditional form, representing daily life and the human figure as its main character.

His works have a realistic basis, but also a subjective component which reflects the inner feelings of the painter.

He is considered a contemporary representative of figurative realism.

Stylistically, Guido Marzulli can be associated with Contemporary Realism.

The painstaking quality of the refinement in his paintings means production is not high, so paintings are found only rarely on the market as a result.

Marzulli starts from the belief that the pictorial story doesn’t need intermediaries to explain the meanings, but must be easy to interpret by common people who should be able to recognize themselves in it, feel direct emotions and find out resemblances to their own private memories without any difficulties.

He, on the other hand, doesn’t scatter himself behind symbolism or hidden meanings, and keeps a fine balance between contemporary and an everyday sense of elapsed time, getting inspired by memories and by social reality, interpreting those, sometimes with an indirect nostalgic mind, with a straight and equable language, chromatic evocative personal sense and often adapting the mere visual aspect to his own feeling and, to his own ideal of composite armory.

He wrote about his thoughts and characteristic urban scenes with a mix of idealism and realism. He also painted life scenes, open markets, seascapes, intimate domestic interiors with figures, and intense portraits, some of which were of his wife, who inspired many of his works.

== Museums ==
His works are conserved at the Museums of Bari (Pinacoteca metropolitana di Bari) and Latina (Galleria Civica d'Arte Moderna e Contemporanea di Latina), Foggia (Museo Civico e Pinacoteca Comunale di Foggia = Civic Museum and Municipal Gallery of Foggia) and Matera (Museo Nazionale di Matera).

The photographic list of many of his paintings and the biographical documentation are in leaflets dedicated to this artist in the Bio-iconographic Archive of the Supervisory Office of the Galleria Nazionale d'Arte Moderna (National Gallery of Modern and Contemporary Art) in Rome (Ministry of cultural assets).

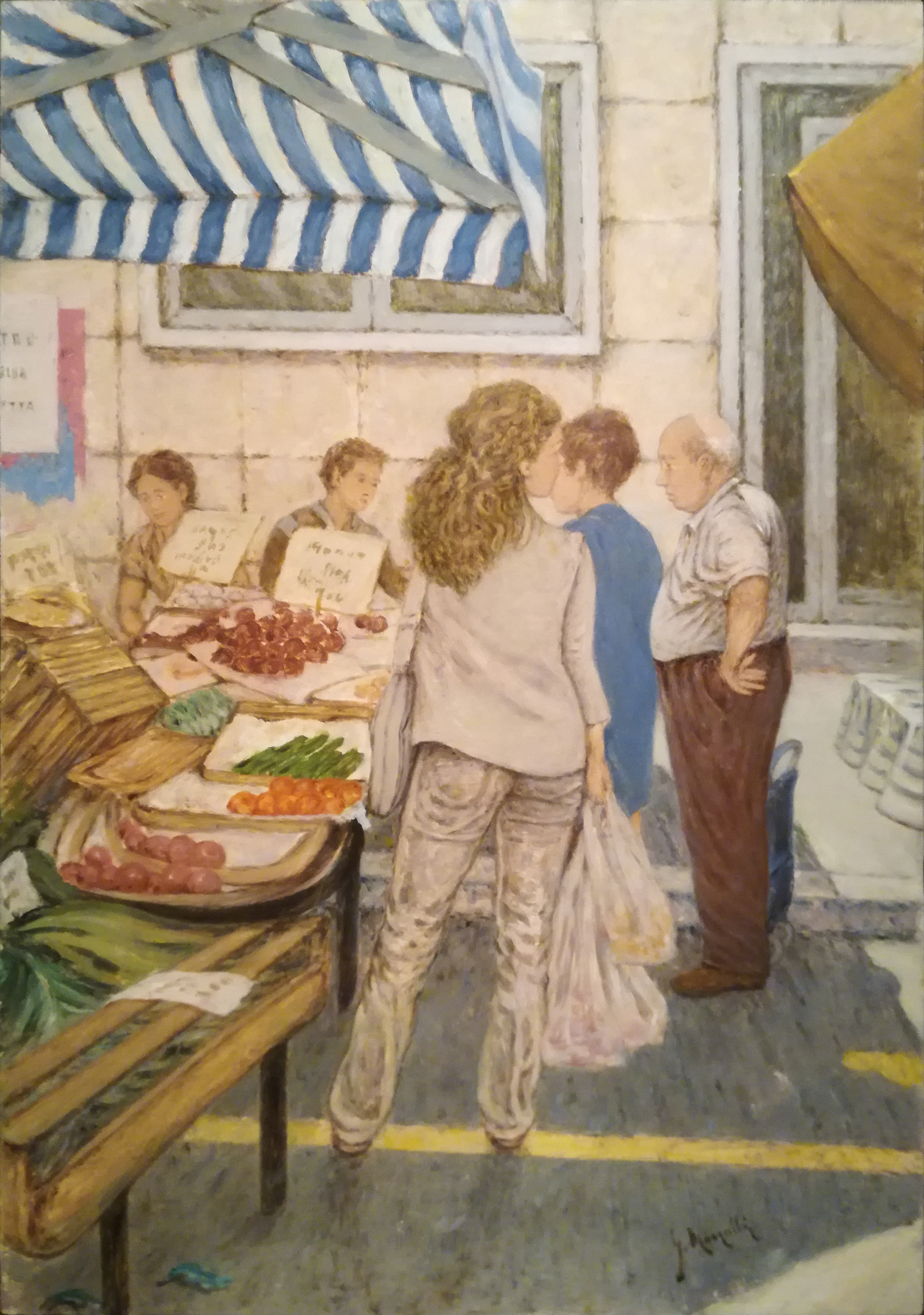
Guido Marzulli - In Line at the market - (National Museum of Matera)

== Bibliography ==
- Rif.1" DIZIONARIO ENCICLOPEDICO INTERNAZIONALE D'ARTE MODERNA E CONTEMPORANEA".ed.Ferrara, Alba, 2003"p"503.
- Rif.2" ANNUARIO D'ARTE MODERNA ARTISTI CONTEMPORANEI", ED.Napoli, ACCA"in...Arte"Editrice s.r.l., 2003"p"513,ISBN 88-88721-00-2.
- Rif.3" Annuario COMED guida internazionale delle belle arti".ed.Milano, Comed, 2004."p"196.ISBN 88-900040-8-8.
- Rif.4 Catalogo dell'Arte Moderna - Gli Artisti Italiani dal Primo Novecento ad Oggi - . Ed. Milano, Giorgio MONDADORI, 2009. N.45, sez.II "p" 280, sez.III "p" 100. ISBN 978-88-6052-245-0.
- Rif.5 PROTAGONISTI DELL’ARTE 2014 DAL XIX SECOLO AD OGGI . - Parte I "p." 127 - Parte II "p" 69. ed.EA Editore. ISBN 978-88-908587-4-1.
- Rif.6 The BEST 2015 Modern and Contemporary ARTISTS - "p." 113 - Ed. curated by S.& F.S. Russo - Roma.
- Rif.7 FRA TRADIZIONE E INNOVAZIONE - Artisti Europei da non dimenticare - Vol. III - Ed. Napoli Nostra 2015, "p" 117, 127, 130 - ill. "p" 117 - 127.
- Rif.8 PREMIO INTERNAZIONALE PAOLO LEVI. - "p." 28 e "p." 323 - Ed. Effetto Arte, 2017. ISBN 978-88-941280-6-2.
