= Museo d'Arte Moderna Vittoria Colonna =

Coordinates: 42.4723°N 14.2123°E

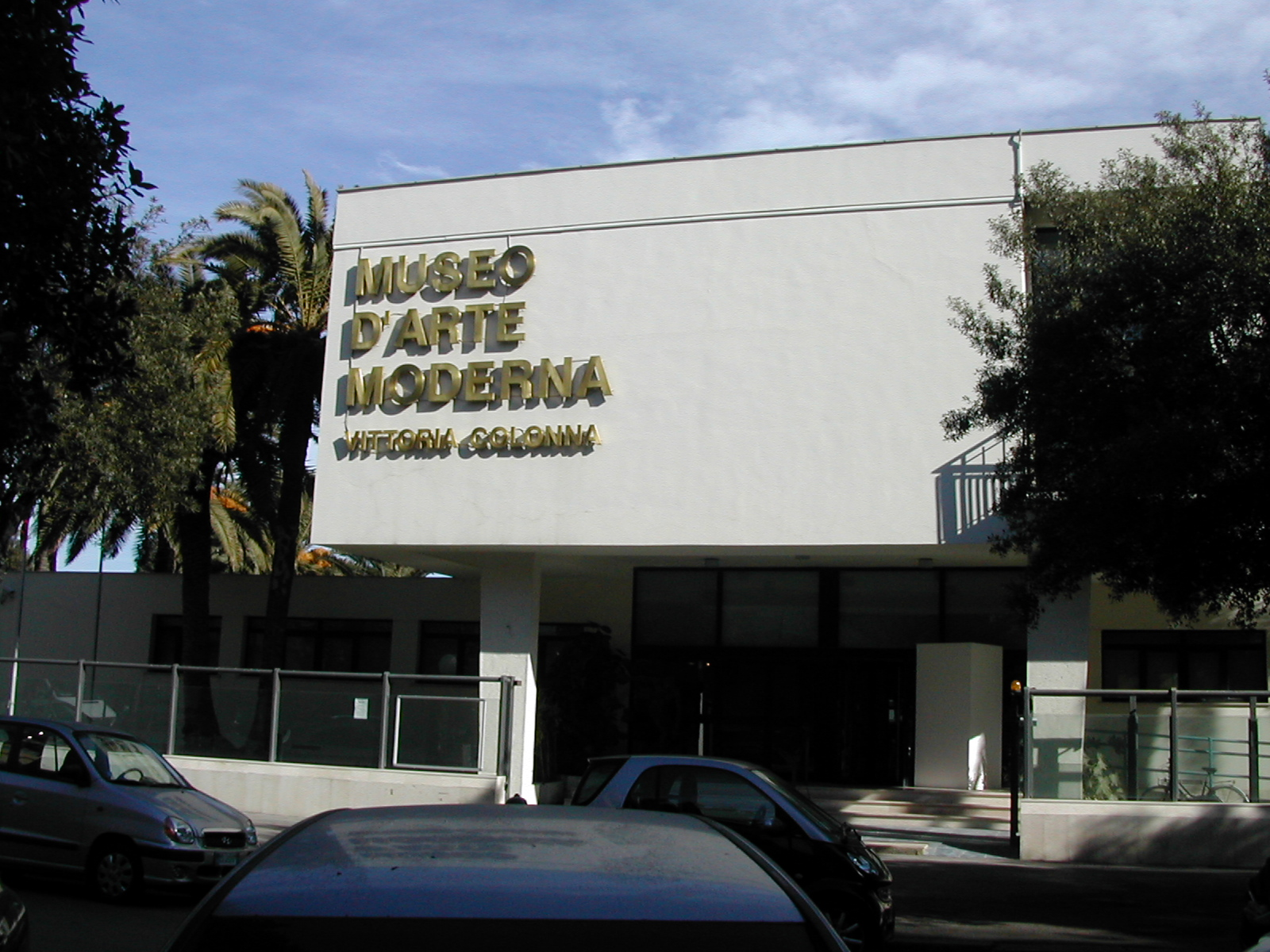
- Location: Pescara
- Type: Art museum

Museo d'Arte Moderna Vittoria Colonna (Italian for Museum of modern art Vittoria Colonna) is a modern art museum in Pescara, Abruzzo.

== History ==
Located in the central area of the city, overlooking Lungomare Matteotti and Via Gramsci (where the historic Tennis Club building used to stand, destroyed in 1943), the Museo d'Arte Moderna Vittoria Colonna has been active since 2002. It is housed in the building that once accommodated some faculties of the Università degli Studi "Gabriele D'Annunzio," which were later relocated to Viale Pindaro. The headquarters was built in the 1950s according to the design by architect Eugenio Montuori. After the interior spaces were refurbished by architect Gaetano Colleluori, the museum was inaugurated in 2002 with an exhibition dedicated to Marc Chagall. It is named after Vittoria Colonna, Marchesa of Pescara, and Don Fernando Francesco d'Avalos, Marquess of Vasto, who was a friend of Michelangelo.

== Collection ==
The museum hosts a small permanent collection featuring works by artists such as Pablo Picasso, Joan Miró, Renato Guttuso, Basilio Cascella, Mario Tozzi, Giuseppe Misticoni, Gigino Falconi, Gaston Orellana, Claudio Bonichi, and Arturo Carmassi. Additionally, it is frequently used for temporary exhibitions.
