= Galleria Civica d'Arte Moderna e Contemporanea di Latina =

The Galleria Civica d'Arte Moderna e Contemporanea di Latina or The Modern and Contemporary Civic Gallery in Latina, in the Region of Lazio, is an Italian Pinacoteca (Paintings Museum).

It was instituted in 1937 as Littoria Pinacoteca (Antic Latina’s name) and its original centre was realised thanks to works donated by various artists participating at the XX Venice Biennale and at the II Roman Quadriennale.

During the war, and after the September 8th armistice in 1943, most of the collection was lost. In December 1994, with those few paintings left together with those recovered by Carabinieri Force, the Gallery reopened to the public at the Palace of Culture in Latina.

In 1996 began the acquisition process that expanded the initial chronological boundary, connecting the existing collection to contemporary art, and enriching the collection of several hundred paintings.

In 1999 a specific contemporary art section was created, which includes paintings created after 1955.

== Collection ==
Some artists exhibited in the permanent collection:

- Ugo Attardi
- Corrado Cagli
- Domenico Cantatore
- Salvatore Fiume
- Marino Marini
- Guido Marzulli
- Plinio Nomellini
- Aligi Sassu
- Gregorio Sciltian
- Arturo Tosi
- Ernesto Treccani
- Achille Vertunni
