= Moderna Museet Malmö =

Modern and contemporary art museum in Malmö, Sweden

Coordinates: 55.6047°N 13.0094°E

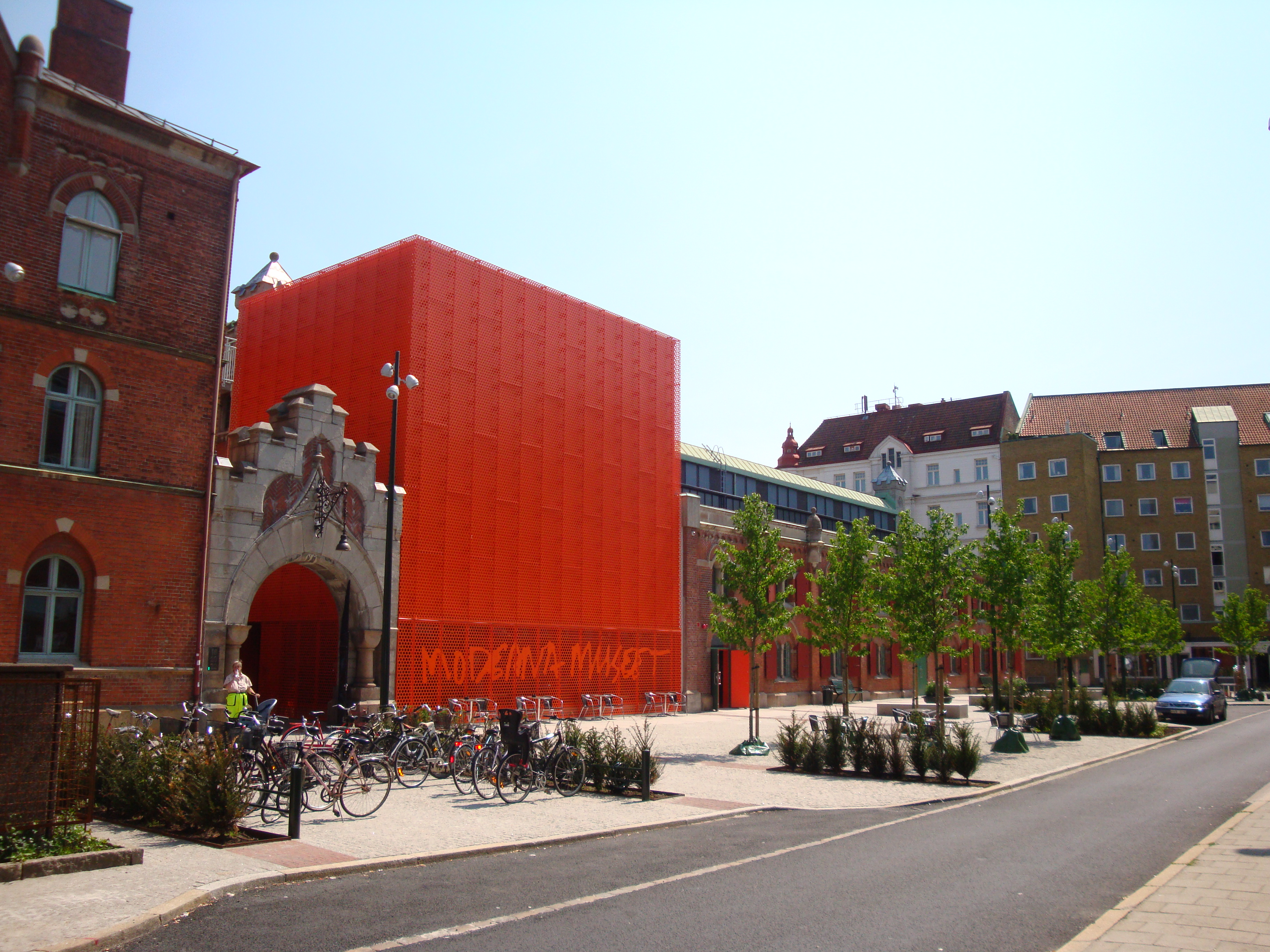
Moderna Museet Malmö with the new annex

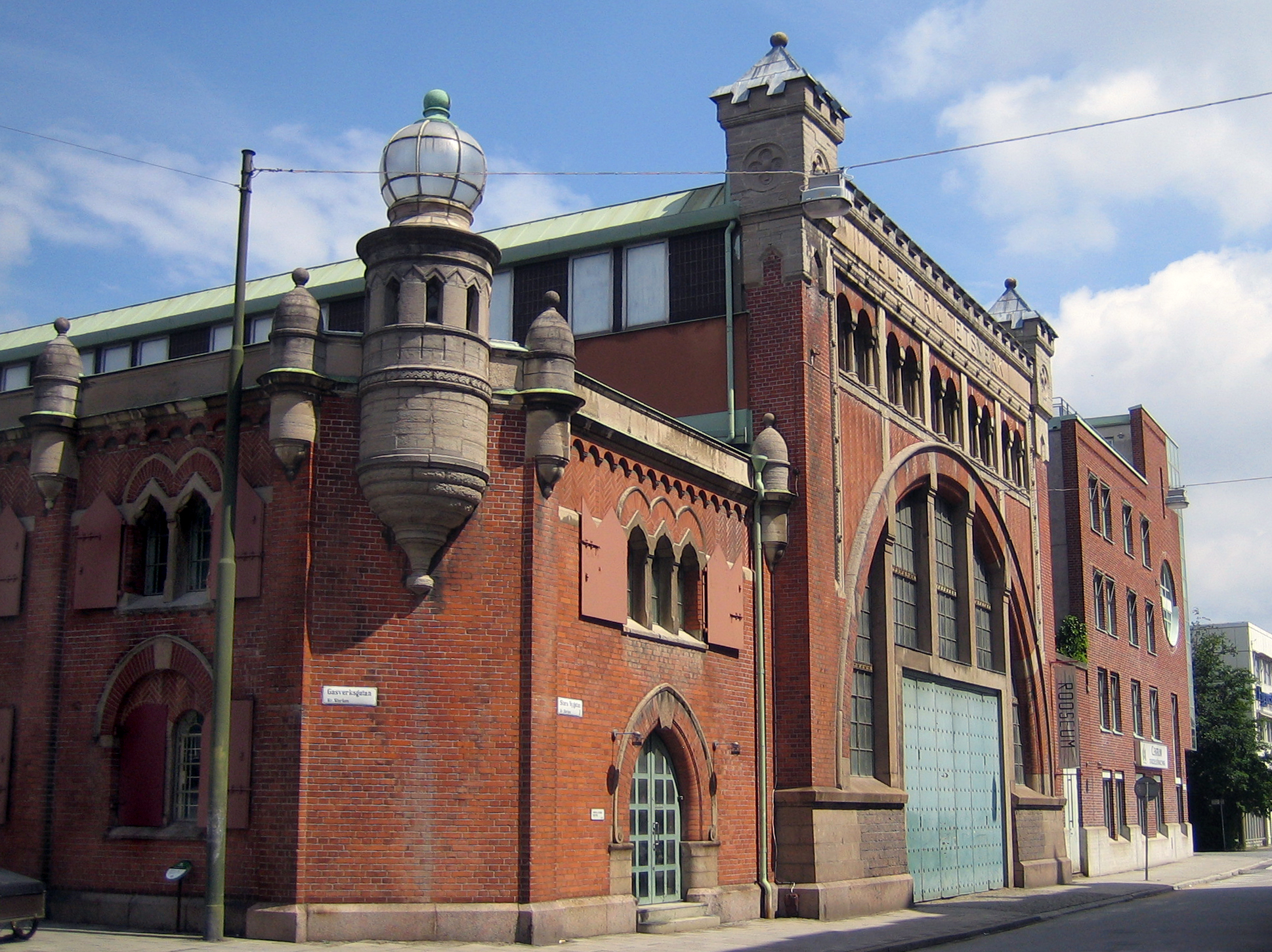
The former electricity plant building now housing the museum

Moderna Museet Malmö is a museum of modern and contemporary art located in Malmö, Sweden. It is a branch of the state-owned Moderna Museet in Stockholm, with an independent exhibition programme. The museum opened to the public on 26 December 2009 in the former Rooseum building, an early twentieth-century electricity plant on Gasverksgatan.

The building combines an industrial structure from 1901 with a contemporary orange-red annex designed by Tham & Videgård Arkitekter. The annex is faced with perforated metal and was designed to relate to the brickwork of the former power station while giving the museum a distinct contemporary identity in Malmö.

== History ==
The main building was originally constructed as an electricity plant in 1901. It was later adapted for exhibition use and housed the Rooseum Centre for Contemporary Art from 1988 until 2006. Rooseum was founded by the Swedish collector and financier Fredrik Roos and became one of Malmö's significant contemporary-art institutions before its closure.

In 2009, the former Rooseum premises were converted for Moderna Museet and given an orange-red addition facing the street. The museum opened with exhibitions by Luc Tuymans and Astrid Svangren, alongside a presentation of 1960s works from the Moderna Museet collection.

== Building and architecture ==
The conversion retained the industrial shell while inserting new museum spaces, visitor circulation and technical systems inside it. The project adapted the former power station to the climate and security requirements of an international art museum. Architectural accounts have described the strategy as a "building within a building".

The street-facing annex contains the entrance, reception, café and an upper gallery. Its perforated orange-red metal facade connects the new structure visually to the older brick building, while the glazed ground floor allows daylight to pass through the perforated surface.

Inside, two new staircases reorganise circulation between the former turbine hall and the upper exhibition rooms. The staircases divide the hall into exhibition areas, an educational workshop and a loading area that can also be used for exhibitions. The museum has 809.5 square metres of exhibition space and a 107-square-metre pedagogical workshop.

== Reception ==
The building attracted attention for its strong use of colour and the contrast between the retained industrial structure and the contemporary annex. Early commentary linked the orange interior and facade treatment to the museum's new identity in Malmö. The project was also discussed for its modest budget, with much of its public presence carried by the facade and large Moderna Museet logo.
