= Moderna Museet =

Modern and contemporary art and design museum in Stockholm, Sweden

Coordinates: 59°19′35″N 18°05′01″E

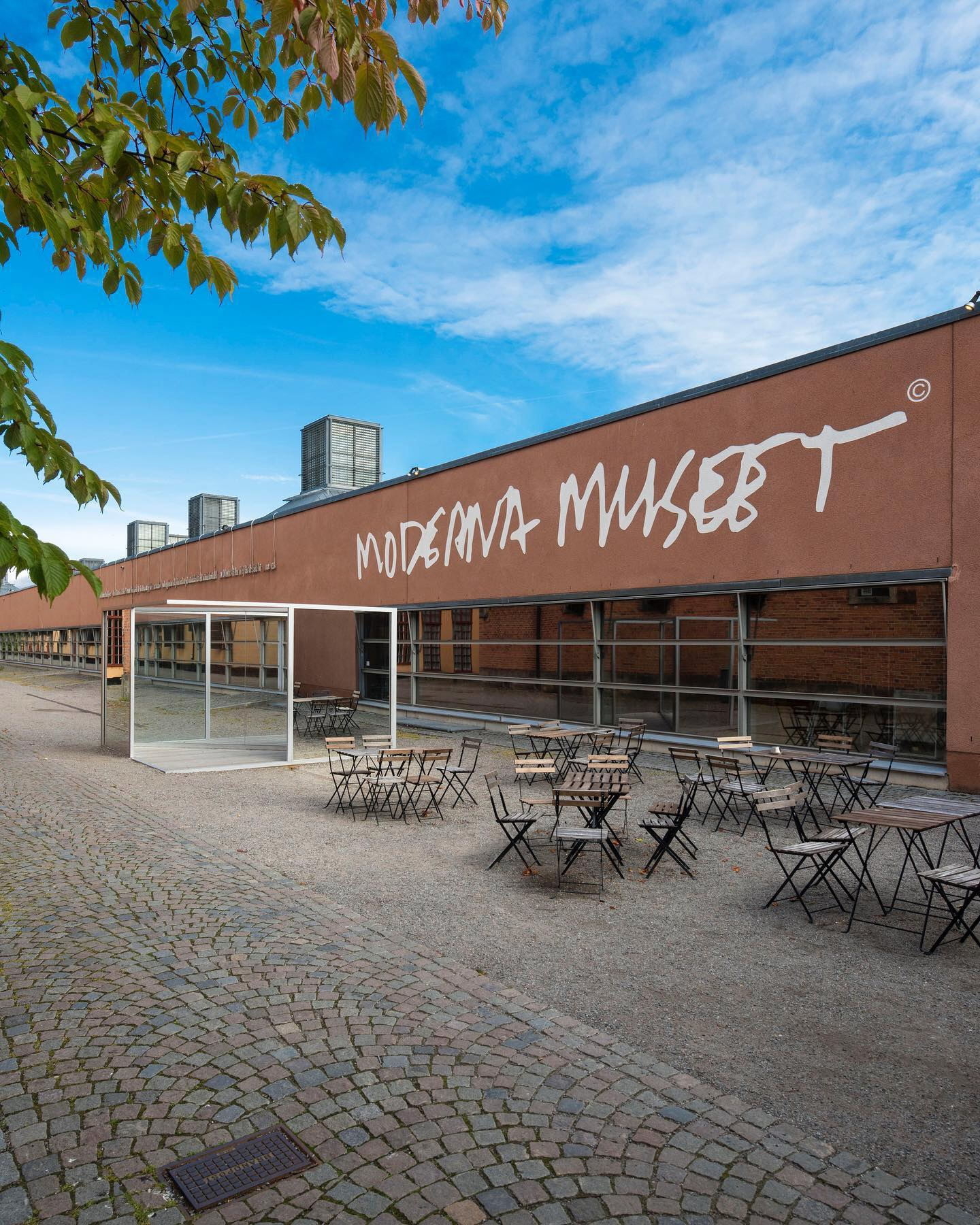
- Established: 1958
- Location: Skeppsholmen, Stockholm, Sweden
- Type: Art museum
- Collection size: c.6,000 paintings; 25,000 graphical prints; 400 art videos; 100,000 photos
- Director: Gitte Ørskou
- Public transit access: Bus to Arkitektur-/Moderna museet
- Website: www.modernamuseet.se

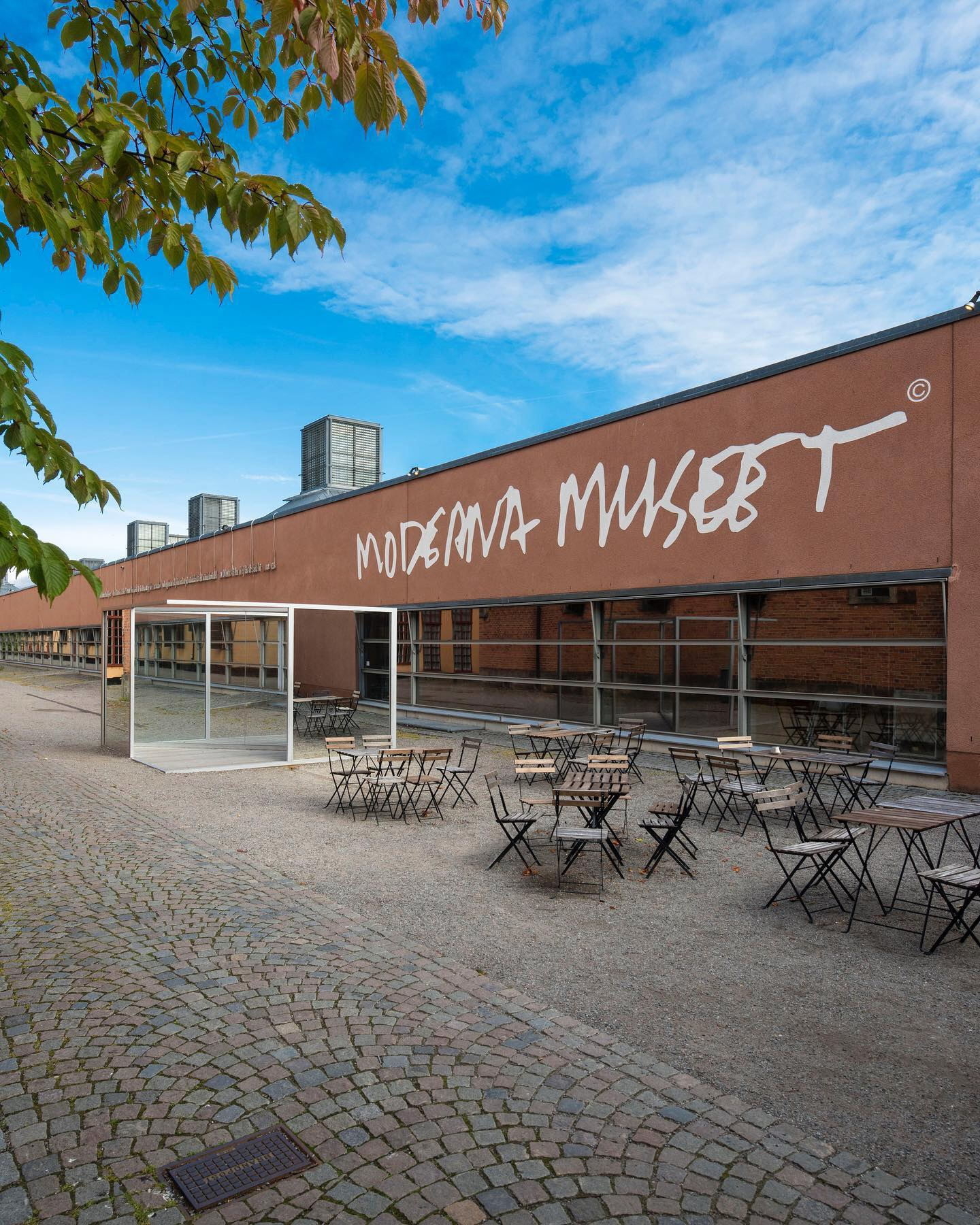
moderna museet exterior

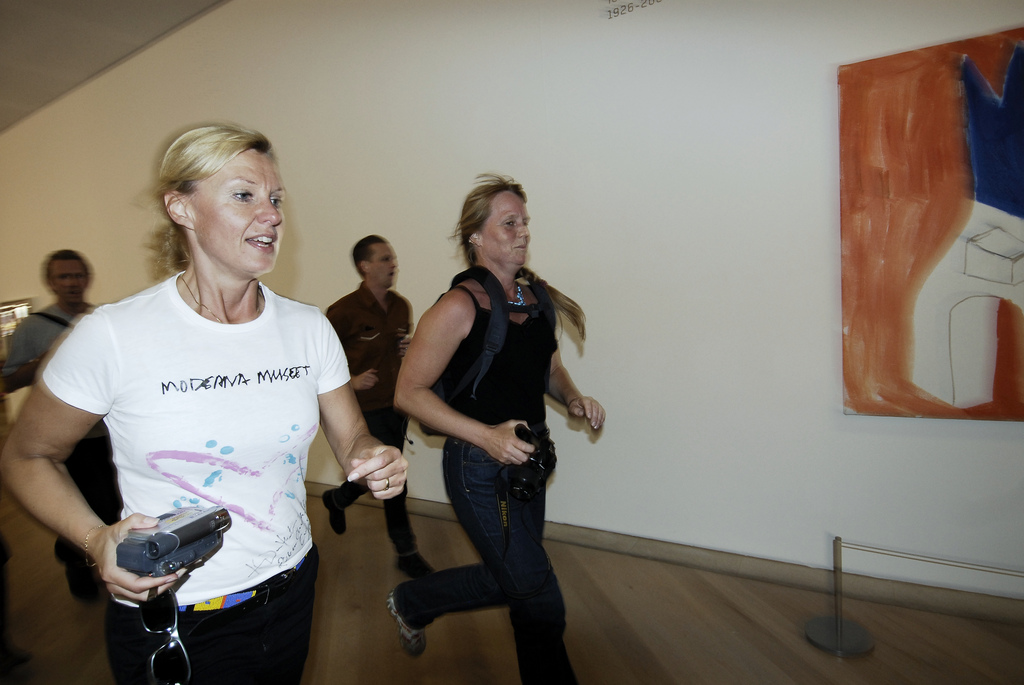
"Art Format Critical Run" commissioned by Moderna Museet debating the thematics: Are critics critical?, Is art in advance of the broken arm?

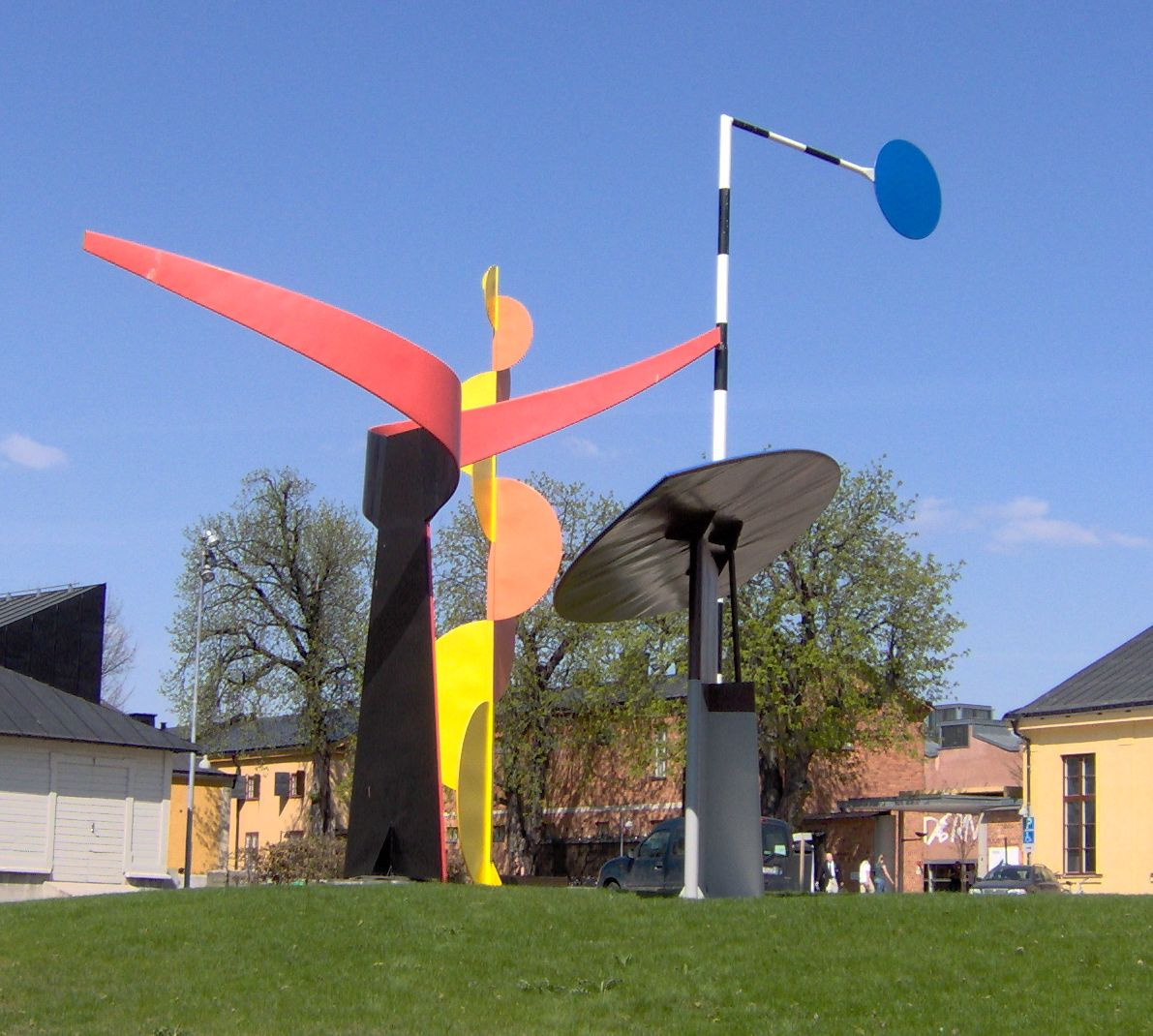
The Four Elements (1961) by Alexander Calder, installation in front of the museum entrance

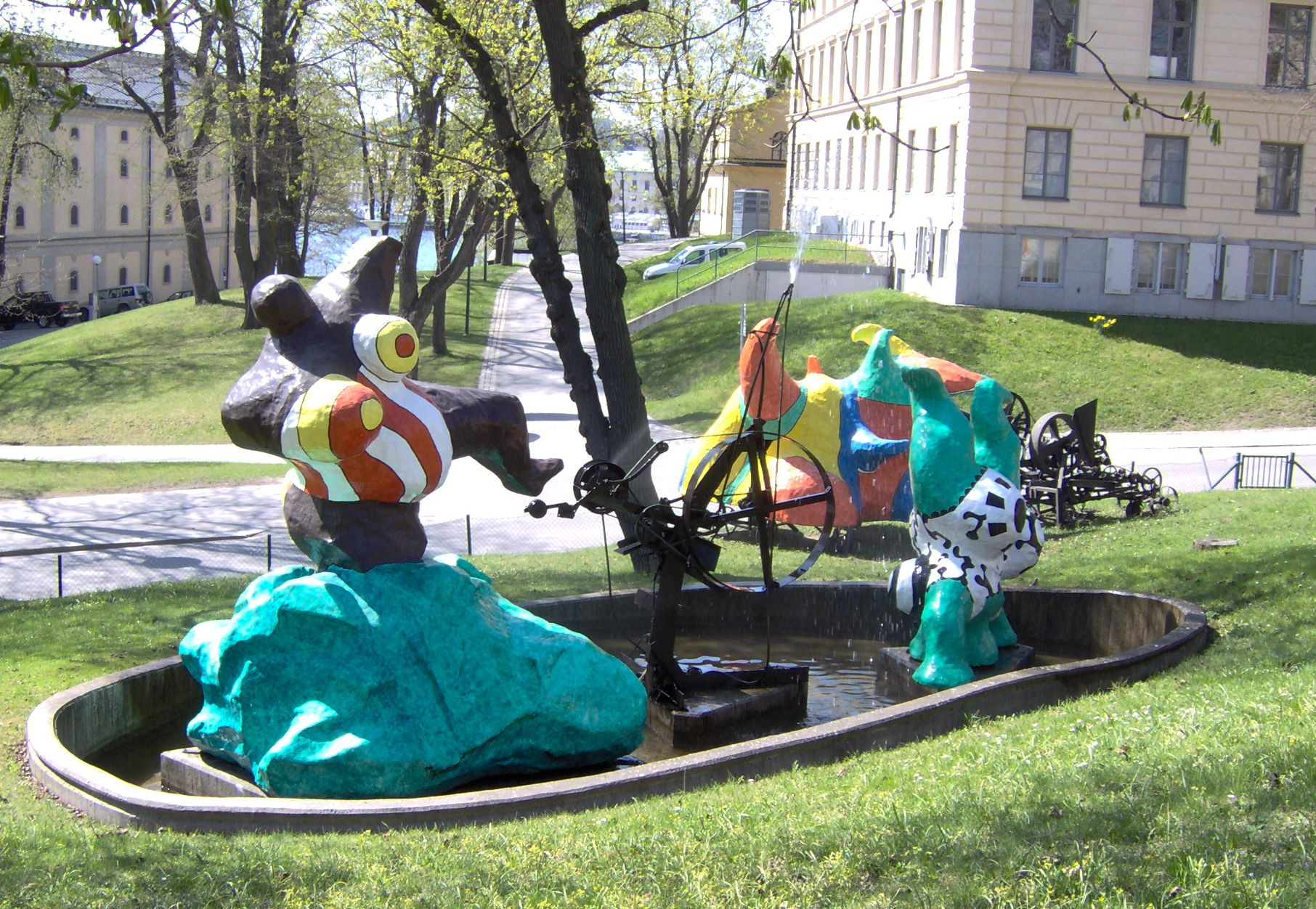
Le Paradis fantastique (1966) by Niki de Saint Phalle and Jean Tinguely, sculptures outside Moderna Museet

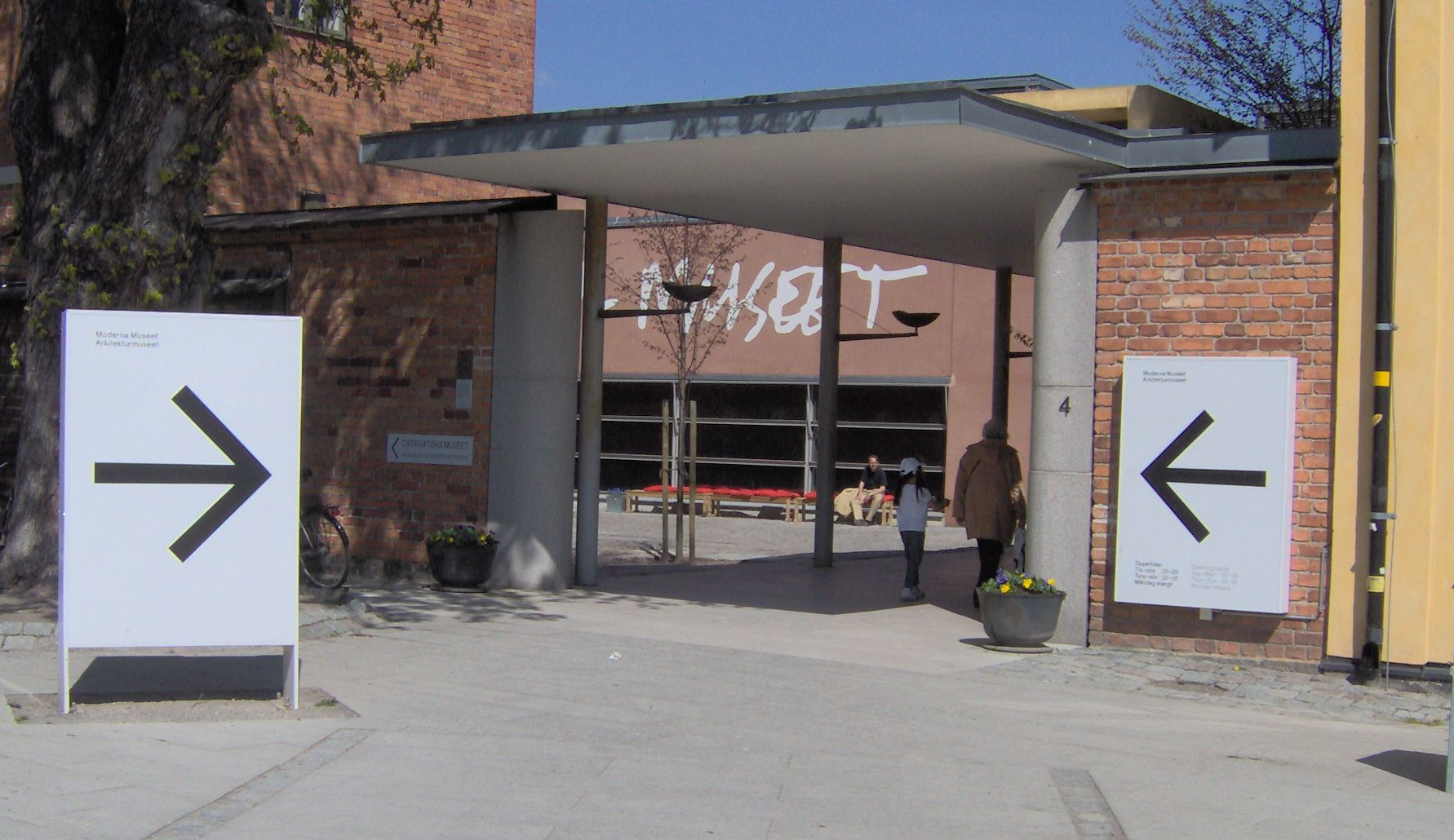
Entrance

Moderna Museet (lit. 'the modern museum') is a state museum for modern and contemporary art and design, located on the island of Skeppsholmen in central Stockholm, opened in 1958.

== History ==
After the original opening, in 2009, the museum also opened Moderna Museet Malmö in Malmö, in a building that had housed the Rooseum centre for contemporary art. The Moderna Museet in Stockholm has been the subject of scholarship on museum history, preservation, and institutional planning.

== Collection ==
The museum houses Swedish and international modern and contemporary art, including pieces by Pablo Picasso and Salvador Dalí, and a model of Tatlin's Tower. The museum's collection also includes key works by artists such as Marcel Duchamp, Louise Bourgeois, Niki de Saint Phalle, Henri Matisse and Robert Rauschenberg, as well as ongoing acquisitions by contemporary artists.

On 8 November 1993, six works by Picasso and two by Georges Braque, totaling more than £40 million, were stolen from the museum in a coup in which the burglars came in through the roof by night, copying a method from the 1955 French film Rififi. All six of the Picasso paintings and one of the Braque paintings have been recovered.

=== Pontus Hultén Collection ===
In 2005, former museum director Pontus Hultén bequeathed over 700 works of art to Moderna Museet, along with his archive and library. A few works of the collection are on display with the museum's permanent collection; many others are exhibited in the purpose-built Pontus Hultén Study Gallery.

=== Sculpture park ===
The museum has a sculpture park on the island with works by sculptors of diverse nationalities.

- The Four Elements, Alexander Calder, 1961
- Le Paradis fantastique, Jean Tinguely and Niki de Saint Phalle, 1966
- Déjeuner sur l'herbe, Pablo Picasso and Carl Nesjar, 1962
- Monumentalfigur, Christian Berg, 1927
- Monument över den sista cigaretten, Erik Dietman, 1975
- Lenin Monument April 13th 1917, Björn Lövin, 1977
- Mannen på templet, Bjørn Nørgaard, 1980
- Svart svensk granit, Ulrich Rückriem, 1981
- Pavilion Sculpture II, Dan Graham, 1984
- Louisa, Thomas M. Woodruff, 1987
- Freedom and Belief (their own affair), Joseph Kosuth, 1998
- No title, Per Kirkeby, 1999–2000
- Instabil, Lars Englund, 2005
- Närkontakt, Gustav Kraitz, 2008

== Architecture ==
The museum was initially housed in Exercishuset on Skeppsholmen.

From 1994 to 1998, it was temporarily moved to another location, the Spårvägshallarna, in Stockholm while the new building on Skeppsholmen, designed by the Spanish architect Rafael Moneo, was built. The Pontus Hultén Study Gallery was designed by Renzo Piano.

The museum shares its premises with the Swedish Centre for Architecture and Design.

== Activity ==
The museum organizes and is a venue for temporary contemporary art exhibitions throughout the year. In 2005, the museum hosted the onedotzero festival with the intention of attracting a new, younger audience to the museum with screenings, installations, talks and live VJ audio-visual events.

Until 4 October 2026, Moderna Museet is presenting Brassaï. The Secret Signs of Paris, an exhibition on the Hungarian-French photographer’s depictions of Parisian street life, signs, graffiti, and nocturnal urban culture.

=== Directors ===
- 1958–1973: Pontus Hultén
- 1973–1977: Philip von Schantz
- 1977–1979: Karin Lindegren
- 1980–1989: Olle Granath
- 1989–1995: Björn Springfeldt
- 1996–2001: David Elliott
- 2001–2010: Lars Nittve
- 2010–2018: Daniel Birnbaum
- 2018–2019: Ann-Sofi Noring (acting)
- Since 2019: Gitte Ørskou

== See also ==
- List of museums in Stockholm
