= Galleria d'Arte Moderna e Contemporanea =

Galleria d'Arte Moderna, Bergamo
- Galleria d’Arte Moderna e Contemporanea di Bergamo
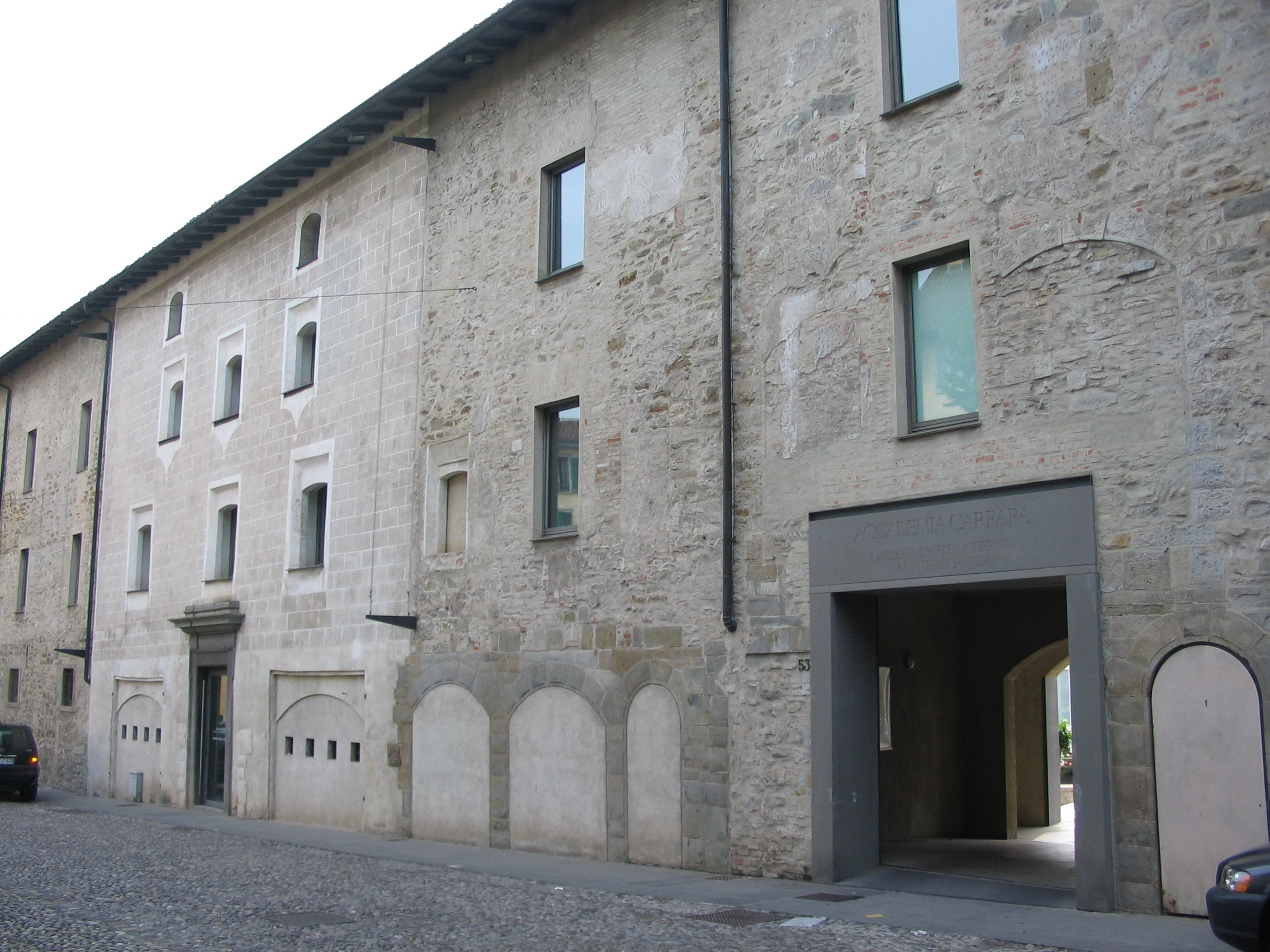
- Established: 1991
- Location: Via San Tommaso, 53, Bergamo , Italy
- Coordinates: 45.7037°N 9.6764°E
- Type: Art gallery
- Website: www.gamec.it

The Galleria d'Arte Moderna e Contemporanea (GAMeC) is in Bergamo, Italy. It opened in 1991. It is located in the former monastery of the Dimesse and Servite, a fifteenth-century complex standing opposite the Accademia Carrara, which was restored for museum use in the late 20th century. GAMeC has about 1500 square meters of exhibition space.

The conversion was carried out by Studio Gregotti Associati International. Since 2000 its activities have been run by a dedicated association under a public–private arrangement whose founding members are the municipality of Bergamo and TenarisDalmine. GAMeC is a founding member of AMACI, the association of Italian contemporary art museums.

In the 2020s the municipality began work on a new home for the gallery in the former Palazzetto dello Sport, a disused sports hall between via Battisti and via Pitentino. Designed by Carlo Cappai and Maria Alessandra Segantini of C+S Architects, the €18 million conversion inserts a suspended exhibition volume, termed the "lantern", within the existing elliptical shell, increasing the floor area from about 2,200 to just over 6,000 square metres. Construction was delayed by the financial collapse of the original contractor, whose contract the municipality terminated in December 2025. Building works are scheduled to finish in July 2027, with the museum due to open in spring 2028.

The collection comprises around 3,000 works from the early twentieth century onwards, assembled largely through private donations. It is built around three nuclei: the Spajani collection of modern masters, the collection given to the city by the sculptor Giacomo Manzù, and the Stucchi collection of European painting of the 1950s and 1960s.
