= Vital statistics =

Vital statistics may refer to:

- Vital statistics (government records), a government database recording the births and deaths of individuals within that government's jurisdiction.
- Bust/waist/hip measurements, informally called vital statistics, measurements for the purpose of fitting clothes
- Vital signs, measures of various physiological statistics, often taken by health professionals, in order to assess the most basic body functions
- Vital Statistics (opera), a 1987 one-act opera about physiognomy, re-titled Facing Goya
