= Duncan Pescod =

Hong Kong civil servant

Duncan Pescod GBS, JP
- 栢志高
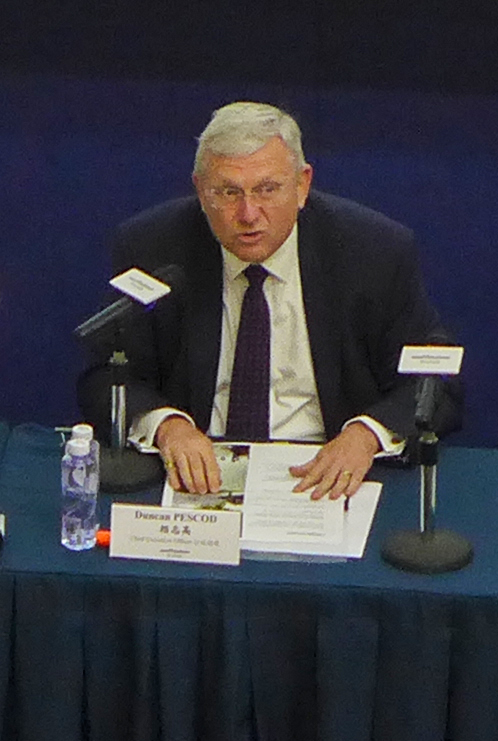
- Speaking in 2017

Chief Executive Officer of the West Kowloon Cultural District Authority
- Incumbent
- Assumed office 3 August 2015
- Preceded by: Michael Lynch

Personal details
- Born: 2 April 1959 (age 67) Sierra Leone
- Education: Sedbergh School; University of Leeds
- Awards: Gold Bauhinia Star; Chief Executive's Commendation for Government/Public Service

Duncan Warren Pescod is the former director of the West Kowloon Cultural District Authority, a statutory body of the Hong Kong Government.

== Career ==
Pescod joined the civil service in British Hong Kong in August 1981. He became an official Justice of the Peace in 1998. Between June 2001 and November 2004, he was Deputy Commissioner for Tourism. Pescod was posted to Brussels as Special Representative for Hong Kong Economic Trade Affairs to the European Communities between 2006 and 2008. He received the Chief Executive's Commendation for Government/Public Service in 2006. From 2008 to 2010, he was Permanent Secretary for Commerce and Economic Development (Communications and Technology). From then till 2014, he was Permanent Secretary for Transport and Housing (Housing) and Director of Housing.

Upon his return from his post in Brussels, Pescod and his wife bought a house in Clearwater Bay, Sai Kung, as a retirement home and investment. In 2012, during his tenure as chief of housing, Ming Pao Daily reported that several unauthorised structures had been found at this property. This negative attention came at a time when other prominent officials, including Chief Executive CY Leung, were found to have similarly illegal structures.

He retired from the Planning Department in 2014 after thirty-three years in the civil service to join the West Kowloon Cultural District Authority. Later that year he was awarded a Gold Bauhinia Star for "contributions in the areas of economic and trade, communications and technology, as well as housing." He joined the semi-independent WKCDA as chief operating officer in October, and rose to the CEO position when Michael Lynch stepped down a year later. His prominent position at the WKCDA was not well received by lawmakers or the arts community. EJ Insight noted it appeared to be a pro-government move at a time when 16 board members were due to retire at the end of their 6-year terms. At one point, the project was controlled by Henry Tang, failed Chief Executive candidate, whose appointment was seen as a conciliatory play by the elected victor Leung.

Pescod was forced to resign from the WKCDA in 2020, not long before his term was due to end.

== Personal life ==
Pescod was born in Sierra Leone, West Africa, and grew up in Thailand. He went to Sedbergh School in England between 1972 and 1977. He spent 1977 to 1981 at Leeds University, at which he was awarded a Bachelor of Arts in Sociology with Honours. EJ Insight reported in 2014 that he was living in a 5000sf house on Victoria Peak leased for $230,000 a month, of which he was paying just $16,000 due to civil service benefits. Pescod's forays into public life beyond the civil service include chairing the Peak School Council, the Children's Heart Foundation and the Valley Rugby Football Club, and a position on the Board of the Ocean Park Corporation in the early noughties.

Government offices
Preceded by Michael Lynch	Chief Executive Officer of the West Kowloon Cultural District Authority; 2014–2020	Succeeded by Betty Fung Ching Suk-yee
Preceded by Thomas Chan Chun-yuen	Permanent Secretary for Transport and Housing; Housing; Director of Housing; 2010–2014	Succeeded by Stanley Ying Yiu-hong
Preceded by Rita Lau Ng Wai-lan	Permanent Secretary for Commerce and Economic Development; Communications & Technology; 2008–2010	Succeeded by Elizabeth Tse Man-yee
Diplomatic posts
Preceded by Andrew Wong	Special Representative for Hong Kong Economic Trade Affairs to the European Communities; 2006–2008	Succeeded by Shirley Lam; Acting
Order of precedence
Preceded by Jonathan Choi Koon-shum	Hong Kong order of precedence Recipients of the Gold Bauhinia Star	Succeeded by Raymond Young Lap-moon
