= Facing Goya =

Facing Goya (2000) is an opera in four acts by Michael Nyman on a libretto by Victoria Hardie. It is an expansion of their one-act opera called Vital Statistics from 1987, dealing with such subjects as physiognomy, eugenics, and its practitioners, and also incorporates a musical motif from Nyman's art song, "The Kiss", inspired by a Paul Richards painting. Nyman also considers the work thematically tied to his other works, The Man Who Mistook His Wife for a Hat, The Ogre, and Gattaca, though he does not quote any of these musically, save a very brief passage of the latter. It was premièred at the Auditorio de Galicia, Santiago de Compostela, Spain on 3 August 2000. The revision with the cast heard on the album premiered at the Badisches Staatstheater Karlsruhe, Germany, on October 19, 2002. Vital Statistics has been withdrawn. The Santiago version included more material from Vital Statistics. The opera was most recently performed at the 2014 Spoleto Festival USA, located in Charleston, South Carolina.

The expanded opera deals with the elitism and prejudice of various movements in pseudosciences and art criticism, wrapped around a thread of a desire to make a clone of Francisco Goya through use of his long-lost skull, which he hid from the likes of Paul Broca, and which the Art Banker finds under a floorboard in a "degenerate art" gallery in Act II. This skull is the object of numerous fights in the second and third acts, often with one character snatching it from another. The opera is non-realistic in its presentation, with only one through-character, the Art Banker. Indeed, when Goya does appear, it is not the result of cloning, but a purely fantastical device. Four other performers play different roles in each section who are thematically connected. In addition, two actors are called for in non-speaking roles. The Art Banker also speaks narration into a dictaphone, but this was omitted from the studio recording, though the lines are reprinted in the booklet.

== Roles ==
- Art Banker, a widow (contralto), loves Goya, but is corrupted by money. She foolishly wants to patent Goya's talent gene. Despite this, she is the most charismatic and sympathetic figure of the satire. She is a time tripper. An art banker is a person who deals in exchange of famous artworks among museums. This character is currently a specialist in the work of Goya.
- Soprano 1 (coloratura), obsessed with science, she lives in her head, and is the one who ultimately cracks the human genome. (Craniometrist 1, Eugenicist/Art Critic 1, Microbiologist). At one point she nearly chokes herself with a tape measure, but continues to sing.
- Soprano 2 (lyric), unhappy individualist who sees the dangers of racism in gene control. She is opposed to cloning and State ownership of genetic readouts. She does not believe that recreating a person recreates that person's talent. (Craniometery Assistant 2, Art Critic 2, Genetic Research Doctor)
- Tenor, a shallow opportunist who believes eugenic theories are reflected in art. His greed leads him to want to make the first laboratory cloned human. A product of genetic engineering himself, he expresses his arrogance in the arietta, "I am an oil painting". (Craniometry Assistant 1, Eugenicist/Art Critic 3, Chief Executive of a Bio-Tech Company)
- Baritone, he doesn't agree with anyone, and they don't like him. He is humorous and self-deprecating, fatalistic, and thinks little of the uniqueness in humankind. (Craniometrist 2, Art Critic 4, Genetic Academic, Francisco Goya)

Soldiers, apparition of Goya, craniometry interns, porters, lab technicians.

== Setting ==
The play moves through three times and places (act 3 and 4 are the same location weeks apart, and all but the baritone remain the same character). The libretto calls for "a Goyaesque landscape of bare branches with bloody clothes hanging off them, and stones jutting out of the earth like gravestones, in the manner of a charcoal drawing." Projections of art and diagrams are used throughout the production.

== Costumes ==
The Genetic Research Doctor (Soprano 2) "wears jeans and a sparkly T-shirt".

The Genetic Academic (Baritone) "wears bicycle clips and a helmet".

The Microbiologist (Soprano 1) "wears a thigh length zip top, leather miniskirt, and stud earrings."

== Orchestration ==
This is the first opera Nyman has scored with his band in mind. The studio recording includes five violins, two violas, one cello, two double basses, two each soprano and alto saxes (doubled), baritone sax, flute, alto flute, piccolo, trumpet and flugelhorn (doubled), French horn, bass trombone (doubled), tuba (doubled), euphonium (doubled), and electric guitar.

== Recording ==
Facing Goya
- Album cover of 2002 recording, conducted by the composer

Studio album by Michael Nyman
- Released: 26 November 2002
- Recorded: June 2001, March 2002, May 2002 (Abbey Road Studios); May 2002 (Snake Ranch)
- Genres: Opera, Contemporary classical music, minimalism
- Length: Disc 1: 71'56"; Disc 2: 61'54"
- Language: English
- Label: Warner Classics
- Producers: Michael Nyman; Austin Ince

Michael Nyman chronology
String Quartets 2, 3 & 4/If & Why (2002)	Facing Goya (2002)	24 Heures de la vie d'une femme (2003)

Professional ratings
Review scores
Source	Rating
MusicWeb International	(mostly favorable)

A recording was released in 2002. It is Michael Nyman's 44th album. Alexander Balanescu left the band during the recording of this album, and his concertmaster seat awarded to Gabrielle Lester, who previously recorded with the band on La Sept (1989). Nyman's own label, MN Music, reissued the opera with a cover featuring his own photograph of a mass of dolls wrapped in plastic, in 2011. That edition contains a third disc with excerpts of Man and Boy: Dada and Love Counts.

=== Personnel ===
==== Cast ====
- Hilary Summers as the Art Banker
- Winnie Böwe as Soprano 1
- Marie Angel as Soprano 2
- Harry Niccoll as Tenor
- Omar Ebrahim as Baritone

==== The Michael Nyman Band ====
- Alexander Balanescu, violin (leader, Acts 1-3)
- Gabrielle Lester, violin (leader, act 4)
- Catherine Thompson, violin
- Gillian Findlay, violin
- Katherine Shave, violin
- Catherine Musker, viola
- Bruce White, viola
- Tony Hinnigan, cello
- Roger Linley, double bass
- Steven Williams, double bass
- Martin Elliott, bass guitar
- David Roach, soprano, alto sax
- Simon Haram, soprano, alto sax
- Andrew Findon, baritone sax, flute, alto flute, piccolo
- Steve Sidwell, trumpet, flugelhorn
- Nigel Gomm, trumpet, flugelhorn
- David Lee, French horn
- Nigel Barr, bass trombone, tuba, euphonium
- Andrew Fawbert, bass trombone, tuba, euphonium
- James Woodrow, electric guitar
- Conducted by Michael Nyman

==== Crew ====
- Produced by Michael Nyman and Austin Ince
- Engineer: Austin Ince
- Assistant Engineers: Andrew Dudman, Roland Heap, Ryu Kawashima, Andrew Nicholls, Paul Richardson, Alex Scannell
- Recorded at Abbey Road Studios, London, June 2001, March 2002 and May 2002
  Snake Ranch, May 2002
- Mixed at Sony Music Studios London, London, June and July 2002
- Mastered by Bob Whitney at Sony Studios, London, August 2002
- A&R: Dirk Lange
- Executive Producer: Elizabeth Lloyd
- Production coordinator: Sarah Morley
- Assistant Coordinator: Miranda Westcott
- Composer's Assistant: Robert Worby
- Special thanks: Vivienne Guiness, Nicholas Hare, Michael Hastings, Jude Kelly, Graham Sheffield, Harry Lyth, James Mackay, Julio Marti, Jonathan Moore, Michael Neve, Karen Price, James Rushton, Neil Wallace
- Published by Chester Music Limited/Michael Nyman Limited 2002
- Project Manager: Lee Woollard
- Editorial Assistant: Christian Müller
- Translations: French, Olivier Laruaz-Gaillard - German, Almut Lenz-Konrad - Spanish, Ángel Seoane
- Art direction and cover illustrations: Thierry Cohen, Paris
- Cover illustrations contain a detail of Petrus Camper, drawing, and portrait of Francisco Goya
- Special thanks to Max for the x-ray of his skull.
