= The Kiss and Other Movements =

- painting by Paul Richards

Studio album by Michael Nyman
- Released: 1985
- Recorded: Music Works, Paddy Kingsland Music Studio
- Genres: Contemporary classical music, art song, opera recital, film music
- Length: 44:11
- Language: English
- Label: Editions EG
- Producers: Michael Nyman, David Cunningham

Michael Nyman chronology
The Cold Room (1984)	The Kiss and Other Movements (1985)	A Zed & Two Noughts (1985)

The Kiss and Other Movements is the sixth album release by Michael Nyman, and the fifth recording (fourth full album) with the Michael Nyman Band. The title track is an "operatic duet" between Dagmar Krause and Omar Ebrahim, based on a painting of the same title by Paul Richards, which is depicted on the cover, and used in a video art project by Richards of the same name. The album includes music from Peter Greenaway's Making a Splash and 26 Bathrooms (originally part of the concert work, Memorial), an excerpt of Nyman's unfinished opera, Tristram Shandy, and a concert piece, "Tango Between the Lines".

== The works ==
=== The Kiss ===
The Kiss was commissioned as part of a Channel 4 series of artists videos, in which Nyman's "operatic duet" plays as Paul Richards creates a painting of a kiss with a Quantel Paintbox. By design, the male voice is a trained singer, the female voice is a self-trained, pop, non-music reader, preferably whose native language is not English, possibly representing an Etruscan. The parts were written for Omar Ebrahim and Anne Pigalle, who performed them in the video. Dagmar Krause replaced Pigalle for the album, and brought to it a darker sonority. The text is based on a collection of 15th century texts about art. The theme line "Images were introduced because many people cannot retain what they hear, but remember if they see images" is intended by Nyman as ironic—the text originally referred to Biblical scenes versus texts from the Bible. The final bars of The Kiss were later used as a prelude to Nyman's opera with Victoria Hardie, Vital Statistics, with which it shares a common theme. The theme is used to similar effect in their opera, Facing Goya, which is a four-act opera built on the remains of Vital Statistics, which flopped and was withdrawn.

=== Nose-List Song ===
"Nose-List Song" is the fourth section of Nyman's unfinished opera, Tristram Shandy. The song is based on "Slawkenbergius's Tale" from Volume IV, Chapter 1 of The Life and Opinions of Tristram Shandy, Gentleman, which depicts a visitor to Strasbourg from the Promontory of Noses. It collects together most of the statements made about the visitor by Strasbourg's residents, verbatim from the novel by Laurence Sterne. As recorded, it is performed as a solo by soprano Sarah Leonard. All of the statements are included in the lyrics sheet, but lines 3-8 of the final stanza are omitted on the recording. The vocal line is mostly, but not entirely, in monotone, with the majority of musical ideas carried by the instrumental music, melodies built on a harmonic pinning of the dominant sevenths A, F, B, and, D.

The lyrics of 'Nose-list song':

Never saw such a nose in my life

'Tis a nose of parchment

It is six times as big but

'tis a nose like my nose

I heard it crackle

I saw it bleed

What a pity we didn’t both touch it

What a nose

'Tis as long as a trumpet

And of the same mettle as you hear by its sneezing

'Tis as soft as a flute

'Tis brass

'Tis a pudding's end

'Tis a brazen nose.

I'll know the bottom of it

For I will touch it with my finger before I sleep

My nose shall never be touched

whilst heaven give me strength

There is more in it than any of a dozen of the largest noses put together in all Strasbourg

'Tis a false nose, made of fir tree

There's a pimple on it

'Tis a dead nose

'Tis a live nose and if I am alive myself I will touch it

Such a monstrous nose, said they, had it been a true one could not possibly have been suffered in civil society -And if false- to impose on society with such False signs and tokens was a still greater violation of its rights and must have had still less mercy shown it. I have made a vow to St Nicholas this day that my nose shall not be touched till I... I'll know the bottom of it for I will touch it with my fingers before I sleep.

=== Tango Between the Lines ===
"A musical 'alloy', bringing together two different but related musical materials. The connection with the tango is somewhat imaginary." This is all Nyman had to say about the piece, the shortest, on the album.

=== Images Were Introduced ===
Bearing the name of a key line in The Kiss, this piece is the sixth movement of the larger work, Memorial, assembled from music used in Peter Greenaway's Inside Rooms: 26 Bathrooms, London and Oxfordshire, 1985. Nyman describes the piece in the liner notes mainly in terms of an exploration of the beauty of Sarah Leonard's upper register, in which he does not have her use words.

=== Water Dances ===
Water Dances forms the score of Peter Greenaway's 1984 film, Making a Splash, a short documentary about synchronized swimming. It is the same recording used in the film, although for the film it was heavily edited and fades out at the end rather than reaching its conclusion. Eventually, Nyman expanded the piece into an eight-movement concert work lasting approximately 40 minutes, although the complete version has never been released on a commercial recording. "Stroking" is Movement 2, "Gliding" Movement 5, and "Synchronizing" Movement 8—Nyman describes Movement 5, a slow movement, as a "remake" of Movement 2. Six movements are built on the chord progression D–G–C–A, derived from a madrigal by Claudio Monteverdi. The remaining two movements are built on the chord progression C–E♭–A♭–G.

== Track listing ==
No.	Title	Length
1.	"The Kiss"	9:05
2.	"Nose-List Song"	7:01
3.	"Tango Between the Lines"	4:55
4.	"Images Were Introduced"	7:36
5.	"Water Dances 2 : Stroking"	5:32
6.	"Water Dances 5 : Gliding"	3:04
7.	"Water Dances 8 : Synchronizing"	6:47

== Personnel ==
Performed by the Michael Nyman Band

- Alexander Balanescu, Violin
- Andrew Findon, Tenor, Baritone Saxophone
- David Fuest, Clarinet, Bass Clarinet
- John Greaves, Bass guitar
- John Harle, Soprano, Alto Saxophone
- Michael Nyman, Piano, Kurzweil
- Elisabeth Perry, Violin, Viola
- David Roach, Soprano, Alto Saxophone
- Steve Saunders, Bass Trombone, Euphonium

with

- Dagmar Krause, Voice
- Omar Ebrahim, Voice
- Sarah Leonard, Voice
- Mark Bennett, Trumpet
- Lowri Blake, Cello
- Martin Drower, Trumpet
- Rosemary Furniss Violin
- David Purser, Trombone
- David Staff, Trumpet
- Crispian Steele-Perkins, Trumpet
- Theresa Ward, Violin
- Nigel Warren-Green, Cello
- Jonathan Williams, Cello

Recorded and mixed by Neil Drake and Paddy Kingsland at Music Works and Paddy Kingsland Studio

Digital Editing at Nova Studio

Mastered at CBS Studios

Re-mastered for compact disc by David Cunningham and Michael J. Dutton, PRT Studios, 1990

Produced by Michael Nyman and David Cunningham

Cover painting and portraits of Michael Nyman by Paul Richards
