= Hong Kong Palace Museum =

Public museum in West Kowloon, Hong Kong

- 香港故宮文化博物館

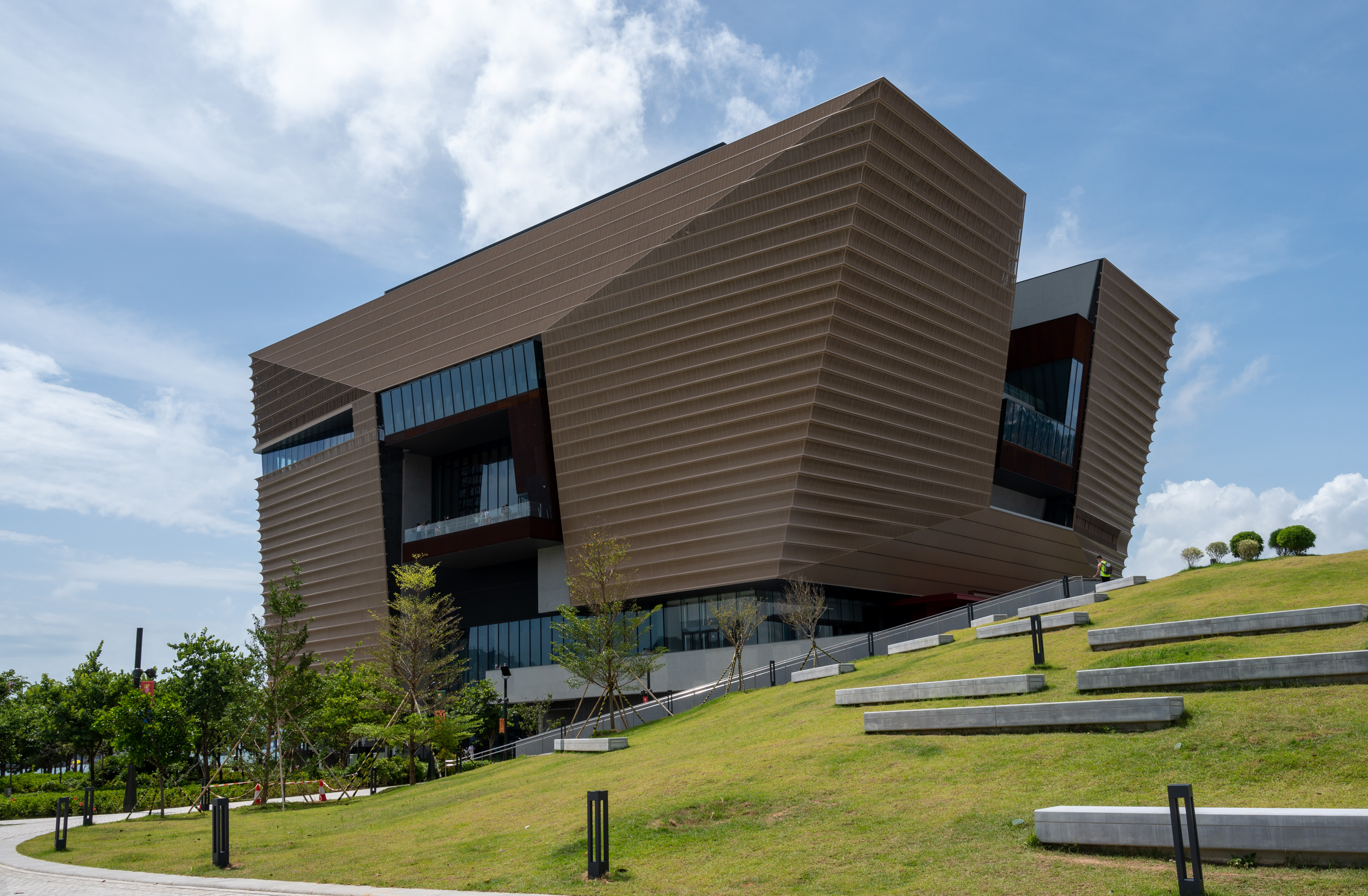
- Hong Kong Palace Museum in July 2022

- Location within Hong Kong
- Established: 3 July 2022
- Location: West Kowloon Cultural District, West Kowloon, Hong Kong
- Coordinates: 22.3021°N 114.1556°E
- Type: Art and history museum
- Collections: Artifacts from the Palace Museum
- Director: Louis Ng Chi-wa
- Architect: Rocco Design Architects
- Public transit access: Kowloon station
- Website: hkpm.org.hk/en

Hong Kong Palace Museum
- Traditional Chinese: 香港故宮文化博物館
- Simplified Chinese: 香港故宫文化博物馆
Transcriptions
Standard Mandarin
- Hanyu Pinyin: Xiāng gǎng gù gōng wén huà bó wù guǎn
Yue: Cantonese
- Yale Romanization: Hēung góng gu gūng màhn faa bok maht gún
- Jyutping: Hoeng1 gong2 gu3 gung1 man4 faa3 bok3 mat6 gun2

The Hong Kong Palace Museum is a public museum in the West Kowloon Cultural District, Hong Kong, exhibiting artifacts from the Chinese government's national Palace Museum at the Forbidden City in Beijing. Construction began in April 2019 and the museum officially opened on 3 July 2022, in commemoration of the 25th anniversary of the handover of Hong Kong.

The decision to build the museum in Hong Kong has generated much controversy and criticism from civil society, largely due to the Hong Kong government's failure to conduct a public consultation exercise beforehand. The government subsequently launched a six-week consultation process whereby, instead of collecting views on whether the museum should be constructed, the public was merely invited to provide views on the museum's design and operation via a short questionnaire.

== Description ==
The 328,000-square-foot (30,500 m^{2}) building was designed by Hong Kong architecture firm Rocco Design Architects, who were directly appointed. It comprises two exhibition halls, activity rooms, a 400-seat theatre, a gift shop and a restaurant. It was built on a landfill site formerly occupied by the West Kowloon Nursery Park.

The museum displays artifacts borrowed from Beijing's own Palace Museum, some of which have never been put on public display before.

== Architecture ==
According to the designer, the building shape is inspired by Chinese bronze ding cauldrons and sycee ingots, and is purposely different from the Beijing Palace Museum to reflect technological advancements, modern culture, and city atmosphere.

== History ==
=== Conception ===
Then-Chief Secretary Carrie Lam stated that the idea of the museum was conceived during an event in Beijing in September 2015. She said that she asked the Hong Kong Jockey Club Charities Trust about funding the HK$3.5 billion project in December 2015, and that the request was approved by their board of directors in October 2016.

=== Announcement and reaction ===
News of the museum was made public in a surprise announcement on 23 December 2016. On that day, Carrie Lam signed a cooperation agreement with the Palace Museum in Beijing. The signing was witnessed by Chief Executive Leung Chun-ying and Chinese culture minister Luo Shugang. Leung commented, "This is the best and greatest gift to celebrate the 20th anniversary of Hong Kong's return to the motherland", referring to the 2017 commemoration of the Handover.

The new museum would display relics lent from the Palace Museum on a long-term basis. It would be managed by a subsidiary of the West Kowloon Cultural District Authority (WKCDA). The cost of construction was planned to be covered by a HK$3.5 billion donation from the Hong Kong Jockey Club Charities Trust. The funding arrangement circumvented the need for the government to seek funding from the Legislative Council.

The announcement was controversial. Critics complained of the lack of consultation. Others viewed the museum as an effort to increase Beijing's influence in Hong Kong and as a "political scheme" to foment patriotism. This followed a year of political turmoil in Hong Kong surrounding Beijing's encroachment on the territory's rights and freedoms.

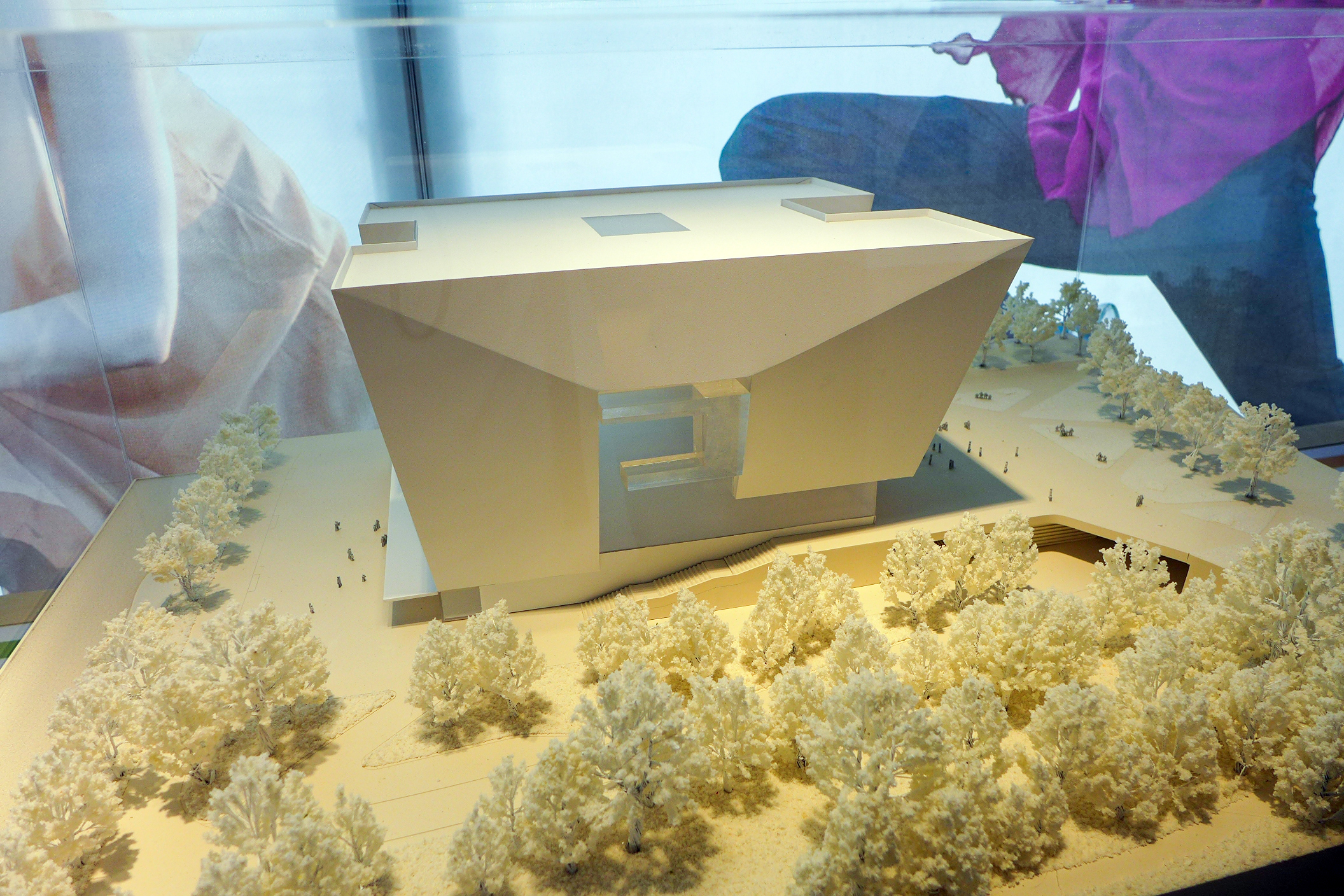
The model of the planned museum

Ada Wong, who sat on the consultation panel of the WKCDA, said that the panel received no notification prior to the announcement of the new museum. She questioned the secrecy surrounding the project, asking: "If it is a good proposal, why didn't they communicate with us sooner? [...] The government should tell us why it chose to inform Hong Kong people in this manner. It should explain why it didn't begin the consultation process sooner, whether West Kowloon is the best site, and who will lead the project." She said she would not oppose the museum, but suggested that its content should be presented from a Hong Kong perspective. Legislator James To said that the opacity of the project planning was "absolutely inappropriate" and undermined Hong Kong's autonomy.

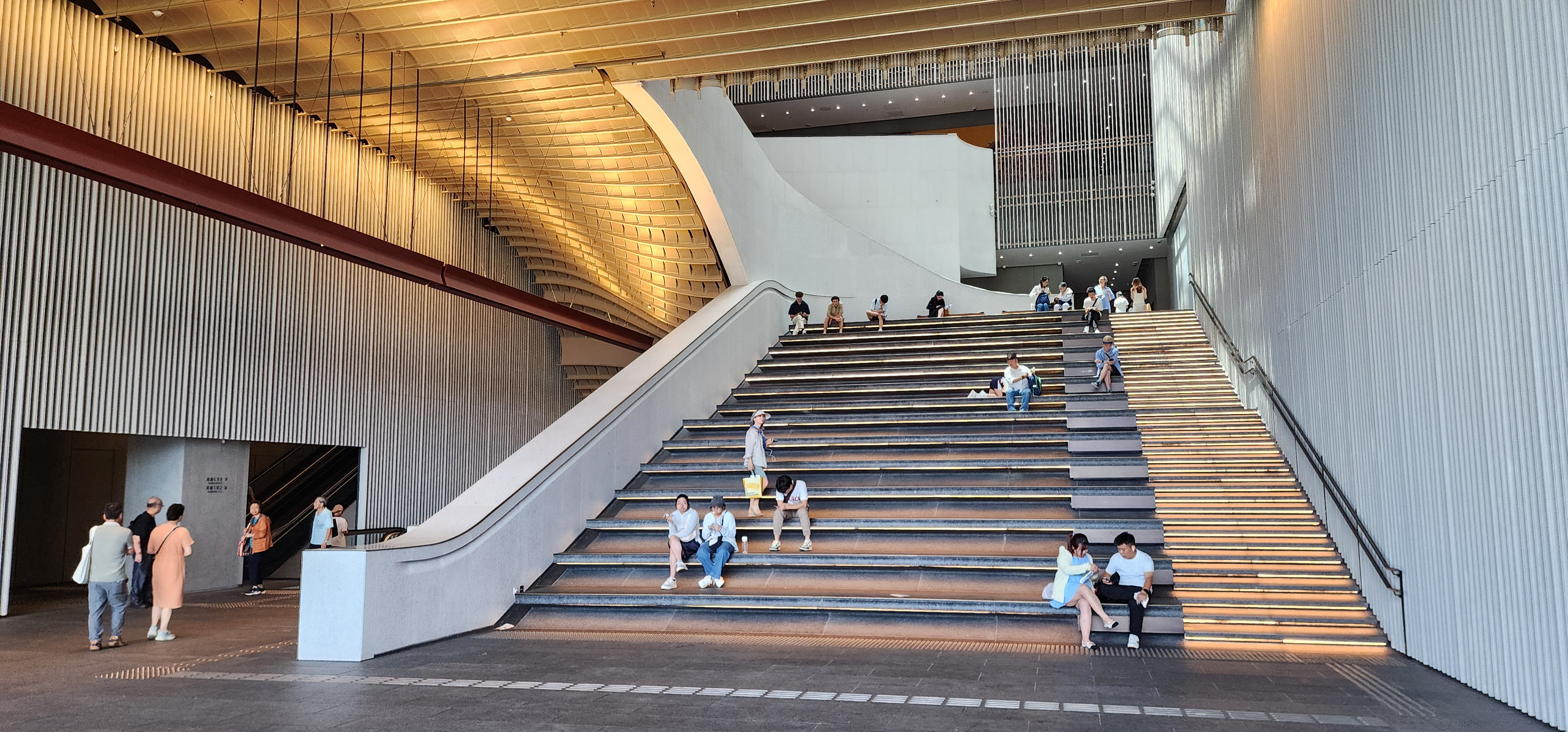
The museum's atrium.

Town planner Camille Lam criticised the direct appointment of Rocco Yim as architect without any design competition, as had been done with the M+ Museum, or open tender, as is common practice for other public buildings. She said that the public should be consulted as the government was changing the established plan for the WKCD, which was drawn up with extensive public consultation. On the other hand, a group called the Alliance in Support of Hong Kong Palace Museum was formed to support the idea. The convenor, Fok Kin-man, stated that the lack of consultation was so that the government could give the Hong Kong people a pleasant surprise.

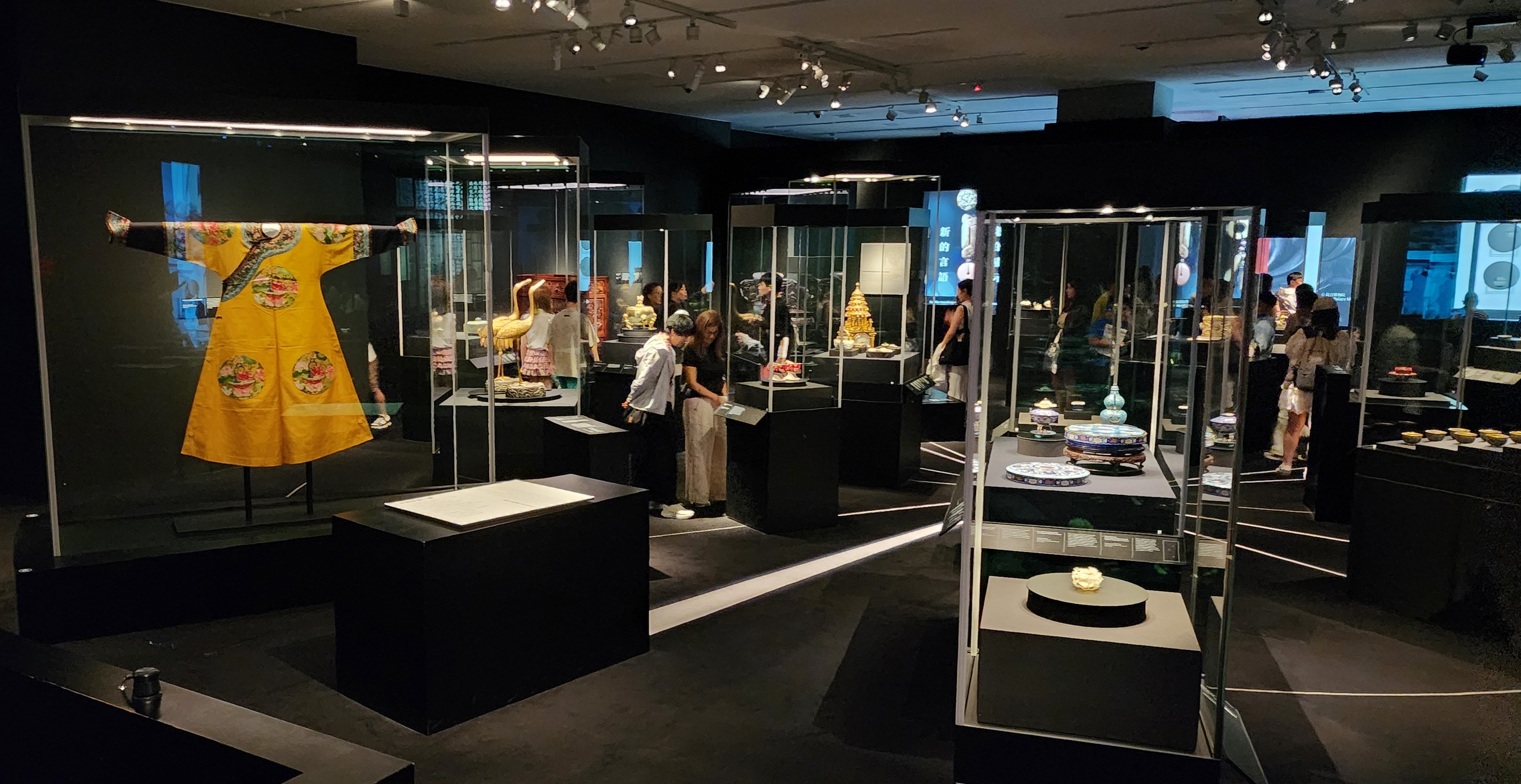
A gallery at the museum.

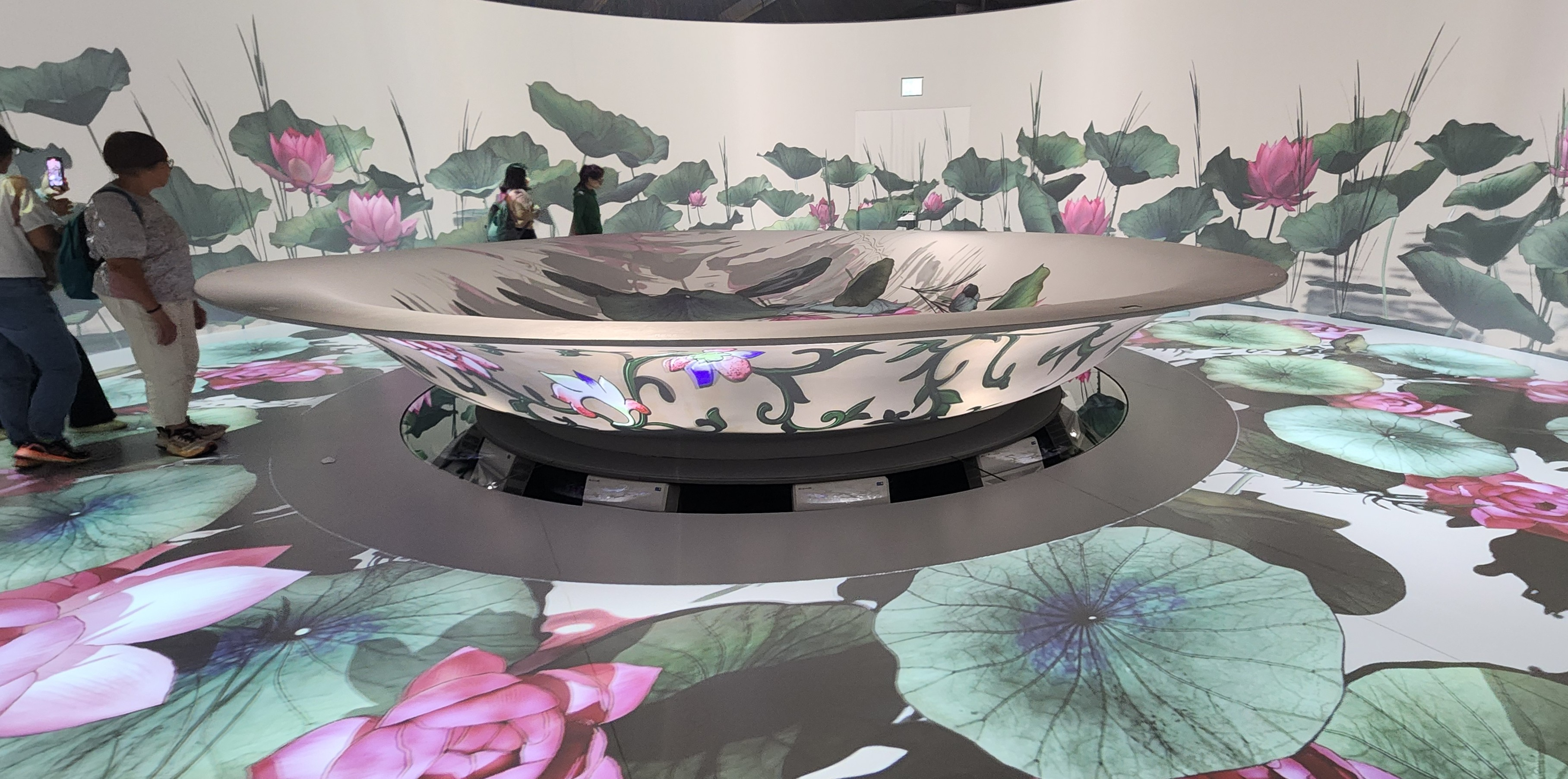
A digital immersive exhibit with music.

== See also ==
- List of museums in Hong Kong
