= Michael Lynch (arts administrator) =

Australian arts administrator

Michael Lynch AO CBE

CEO of the WKCDA
- Assuming office July 2011
- Appointed by: Henry Tang (Chairman of the WKCDA)
- Succeeding: Graham Sheffield

Personal details
- Born: 1950 (age 75–76) Australia
- Spouse: Chrissy Sharp
- Portfolio: CEO of the Southbank Centre; CEO of the Sydney Opera House; GM of the Australia Council; GM of the Sydney Theatre Company

Michael Francis Lynch AO CBE (born 1950) is an Australian arts administrator.

== Biography ==
Lynch was General Manager of the Sydney Theatre Company from 1989 to 1994. He was then General Manager of the Australia Council, the Federal Government's arts funding and advisory body, from 1994 to 1998. In 1998, he became director of the Sydney Opera House, and from 2002 to 2009 he was chief executive of the South Bank Centre in London.

Lynch has overseen the successful rehabilitation of the Royal Festival Hall, which was re-opened in October 2007 by The Queen (King George VI having opened the original building in 1951).

In March 2009, Lynch was appointed a director of the Australian Broadcasting Corporation. He is also a member of the Board of Film Victoria.

On 27 May 2011, Lynch was appointed as CEO of West Kowloon Cultural District Authority by the Hong Kong Government.

== Honours ==
Lynch was appointed a Member of the Order of Australia (AM) in the Queen's Birthday Honours List of 2001 for services to arts administration (principally as General Manager of the Australia Council) and in 2008 he was appointed Commander of the Order of the British Empire (CBE) in the Birthday Honours. In the Queen's Birthday Honours List of 2017, Lynch was appointed an Officer of the Order of Australia (AO).
