= Ray Exworth =

British sculptor active 1960s-early 2000s

Ray Exworth (1930–2015) was a British sculptor.

== Early life and career ==
Raymond Charles Exworth was born in Ipswich on 18 March 1930, the eldest of the five sons of Charles William Exworth, moulder in an iron foundry, and his wife Ivy Elsie née Bennett.

== Education ==
Ray was educated at Northgate Grammar School in Ipswich and after a brief period as an apprentice engineer in a foundry and as a meteorologist, Ray studied at Ipswich School of Art in 1951–55. Following a visit to the Musée Rodin in Paris he resolved to become a sculptor. Over 1955–59 Exworth was enrolled at the Royal College of Art, where he was awarded Royal Scholar in 1956, and a travelling scholarship in 1958.

== Cornwall ==
Exworth married Susan Kalman, a secretary, in 1959 and moved to Heather Bell Cottage, Cornwall, where in 1983 Jem Southam photographed the seven sheds in his garden crammed with his sculptures, which he described as "inscrutable cathedral[s] of Exworth’s mind". Exworth started a sculpture department at Falmouth School of Art, where he tutored Paul Richards and David Tremlett. He then taught part-time at the Royal College of Art and was visiting lecturer at other art colleges.

== Awards and exhibitions ==
Though he exhibited infrequently, and had only one major solo exhibition Felixstowe Remembered, a large-scale mixed-media sculptural installation and drawings, at the Whitechapel Art Gallery in February 1975, Exworth won three Arts Council awards, in 1975, 1977, and 1984 and a South West Arts Fellowship in 1985. He also exhibited at Plymouth Arts Centre in 1984 and the Chappel Galleries, Essex in 1992, the same year in which he was included in Artists from Cornwall at the Royal West of England Academy. He showed in the Royal Cornwall Museum, 24 May–12 July 2003, and over September–October 2011 at Kestle Barton, Helston.

== Reception ==
Exworth was known as a recluse, and in reviewing his 1984 exhibition Boxes for a Circus at Plymouth Arts Centre, Onley describes him "coming out of hiding" to display his work-in-progress on a vast and complex installation called The Circus "in the shape of about 40 open, wall-mounted boxes containing constructions which explore his circus themes and ideas. Some of the boxes are maquettes for sections of the main work, and others are like sideshow displays of curiosities," and concludes that "the found materials and reclaimed junk that Exworth uses become, in these magic boxes, the stuff of nightmares, fantasies, and fears. When he completes his full-scale Circus, it will surely be one of the most ambitious and bizarre constructions ever devised." Jansen, arts reviewer for The New York Times, The Guardian, and The Financial Times, later described his work as "sprawling, intricate and wildly ambitious", while UK critic Bruce Bernard considered him a "sculptor of probable genius."
