= West Kowloon Cultural District =

Government-planned cultural district in Hong Kong

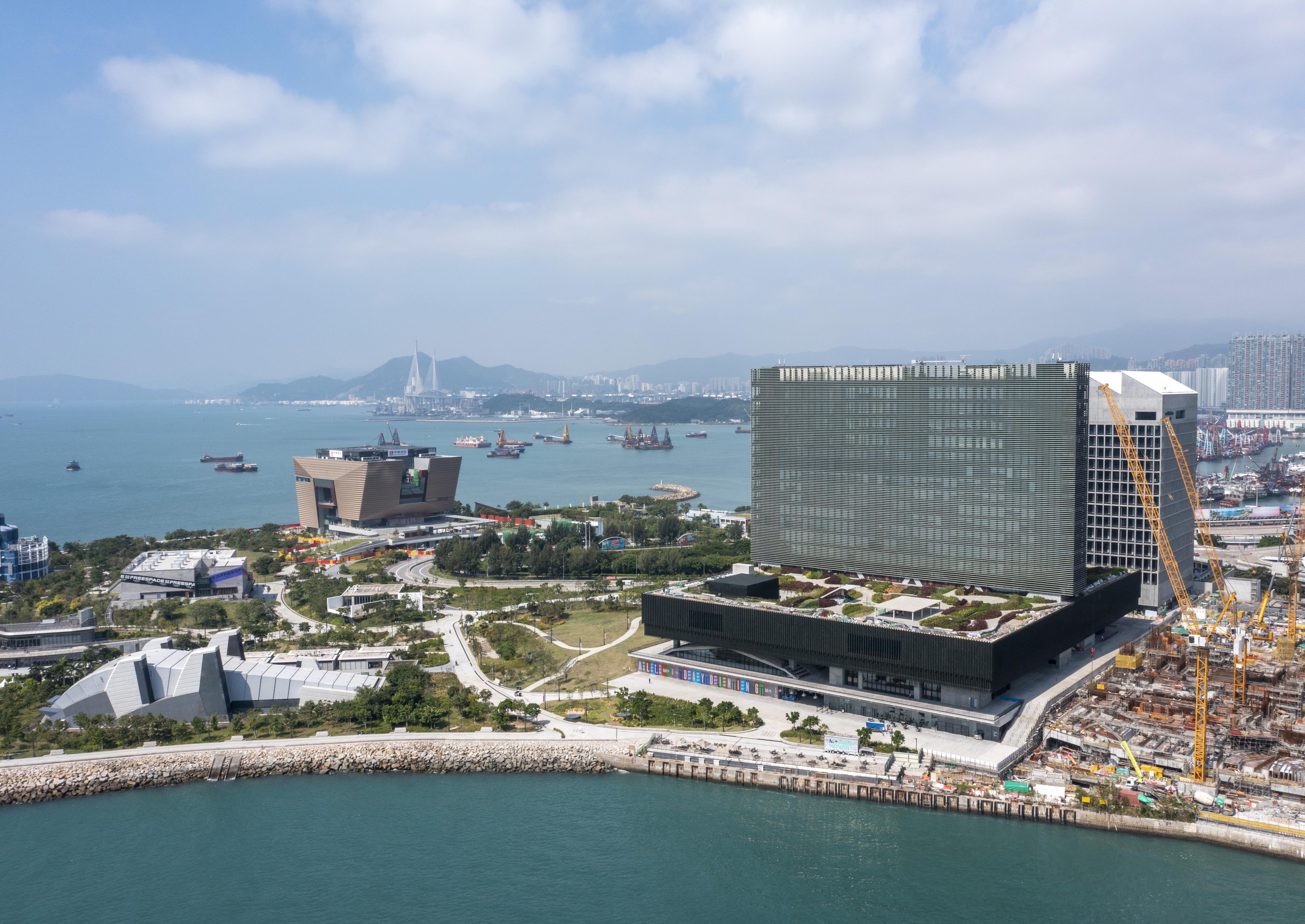
- West Kowloon Cultural District with sections under various stages of construction in 2021
- Interactive map of West Kowloon Cultural District
- Location: Yau Tsim Mong, Kowloon, Hong Kong
- Coordinates: 22.3010°N 114.1550°E
- Owner: West Kowloon Cultural District Authority
- Type: Visual arts, performing arts and educational venues

Construction
- Built: 22 July 2016; 10 years ago (M+ Pavilion)
- Cost: At least HK$21.6 billion

Website
- westkowloon.hk

Chinese name
- Traditional Chinese: 西九文化區
- Simplified Chinese: 西九文化区
Transcriptions
Standard Mandarin
- Hanyu Pinyin: Xī Jiǔ Wénhuà Qū
Yue: Cantonese
- Yale Romanization: Sāi gáu máhn faa kēui
- Jyutping: Sai1 gau2 man4 faa3 keoi1

The West Kowloon Cultural District (WKCD, Chinese: 西九文化區) is a large arts development in Hong Kong. Designed and planned by Foster and Partners, the district comprises 40 hectares (99 acres) with 17 venues. Major establishments include Xiqu Centre for Chinese opera, the Freespace Centre for contemporary performance, the M+ Museum, and the Hong Kong Palace Museum. As of 2023, the Lyric Theatre and other commercial structures are under construction. It is managed by the West Kowloon Cultural District Authority (WKCDA).

== Location ==
The wedge-shaped waterfront site was created from reclaimed land in the 1990s as part of the Airport Core Programme. It lies west of Yau Ma Tei in the Yau Tsim Mong District and is bounded by Canton Road in the east, the Western Harbour Crossing, Austin Road West, and Victoria Harbour.

It is within walking distance of Tsim Sha Tsui (TST), a popular tourist area, and of the Kowloon Station and West Kowloon Terminus complex, which is connected to the Elements commercial centre and national high-speed rail network.

== Venues ==
=== Batch 1 ===
==== West Kowloon Bamboo Theatre (demolished) ====
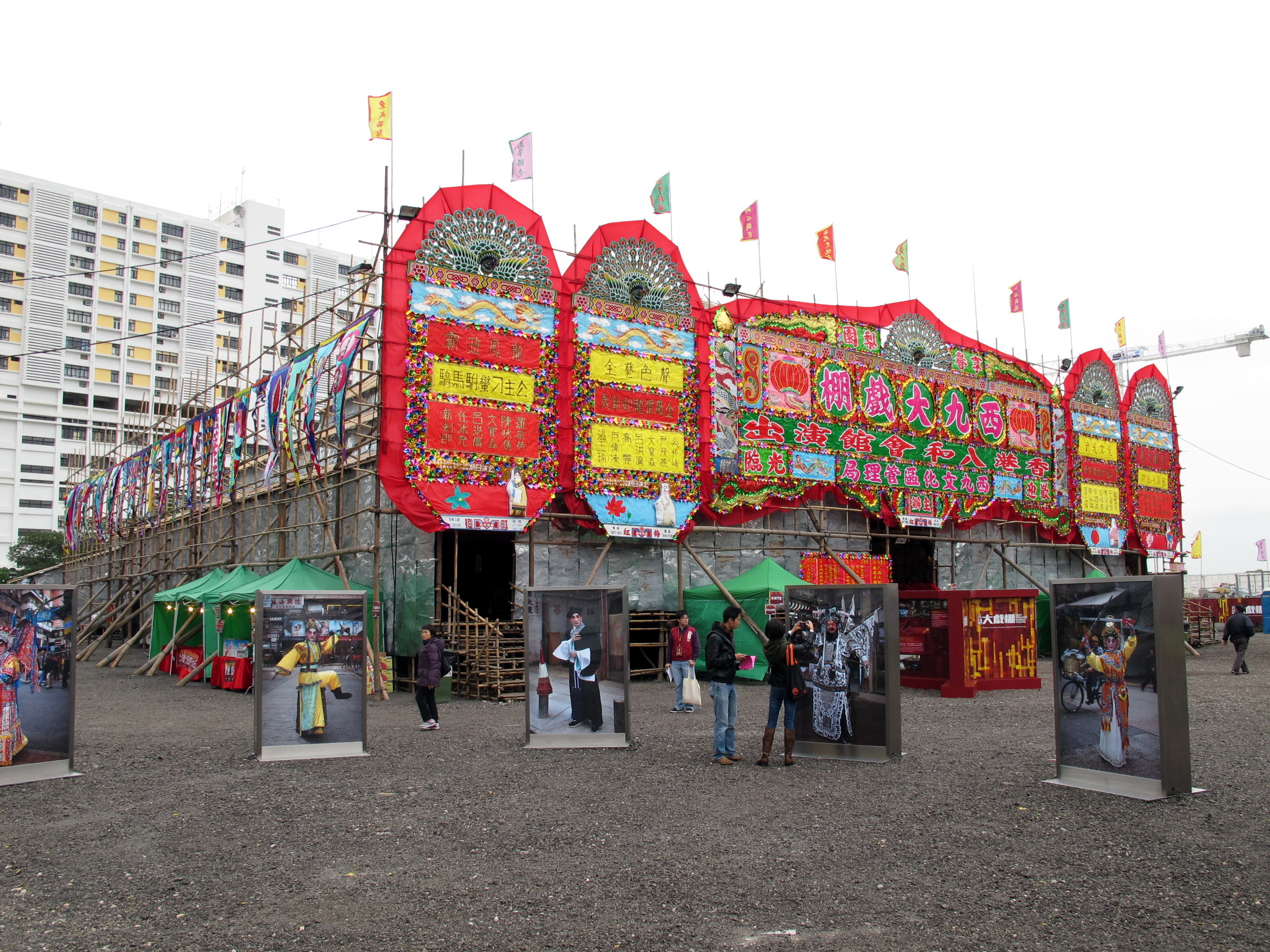
West Kowloon Bamboo Theatre (2012, demolished)

The West Kowloon Bamboo Theatre was built at the junction of Canton Road and Austin Road West (the present site of Xiqu Centre) in January 2012. It was the first cultural event organised by WKCDA to mark the launch of the design and construction stage of the district. Bamboo theaters were once a staple for honouring and celebrating the Chinese sea goddess Tin Hau and Zhen Jun. The event, which was a combination of traditional Cantonese opera, contemporary visual art installations and film shows in collaboration with the Chinese Artists Association of Hong Kong and involved various renowned visual artists, attracted over 12,000 participants in 7 days. The Bamboo Theatre was initially to be an annual event, but as of 2021 has not been recreated.

==== AXA x WONDERLAND (nursery park) ====
Opened in July 2015, the temporary Nursery Park is located at the northwestern part of the site. It features open lawns and a pet zone, and is a testing ground for greenery in the future park. It is also where Freespace Happening, a free outdoor music and arts event, takes place. Since September 2022, it is called AXA x WONDERLAND.

==== M+ Pavilion ====
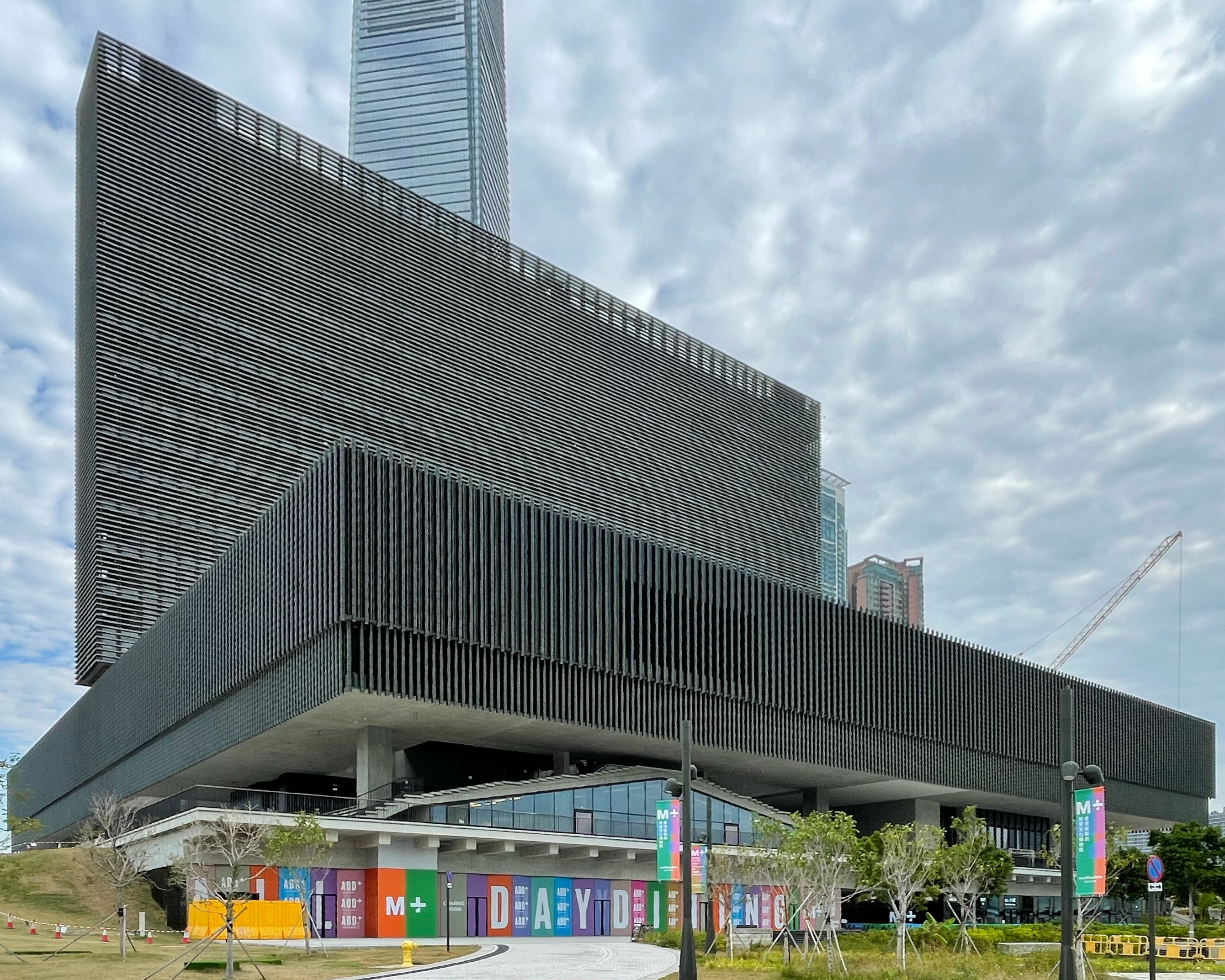
M+ Museum in 2021

Designed by VPANG + JET + Lisa Cheung, the M+ Pavilion was used to provide exhibition space for M+ prior to the completion of the main museum building. It was inaugurated with the exhibition 'Nothing' by Hong Kong artist Tsang Kin-Wah in September 2016. It is now used a multi purpose space hosting various events and exhibitions.

==== Art Park ====
The park includes Freespace and The Lawn. Designed by Dennis Lau & Ng Chun Man Architects & Engineers with West 8 and ACLA, the park was partially opened in 2017 and fully operational by 2018.

==== Xiqu Centre ====
Located on the eastern edge of the district, at the junction of Canton Road and Austin Road, the Xiqu Centre is directly accessible from Kowloon MTR Station, Austin MTR station and West Kowloon Terminus. The building was inspired by traditional Chinese lanterns. Stepping through the main entrance, shaped to resemble parted stage curtains, visitors are led directly into an atrium with a raised podium and space for presenting Chinese traditional theatre. The eight-storey building has a total area of 28,164 sq m and houses a Grand Theatre, accommodating 1,075 seats, a Tea House Theatre, with a capacity of up to 200 seats, eight professional studios and a seminar hall, all specially designed for different types of xiqu-related functions and activities. A unique feature of the venue is the location of the Grand Theatre at the top of the building, which allows for the large open atrium below. It was designed by Revery Architecture (formerly Bing Thom Architects) and Ronald Lu & Partners and opened in January 2019.

==== Freespace ====
Freespace, a centre for contemporary performance, has the largest blackbox theatre in Hong Kong, accommodating up to 900 people, as well as other multi-purpose venues designed for creative exchanges, exhibitions and workshops, as well as professional and private meetings and gatherings. Freespace is a space fully adaptable for small- to medium-sized performances of experimental theatre, dance, parkour multimedia shows and music events, as well as exhibitions. Freespace Livehouse is a small bar and performance space presenting music from Hong Kong and around the world, also hosting workshops, film screenings and cultural events, and free outdoor music in the Art Park. Freespace was designed by Dennis Lau & Ng Chun Man Architects and Engineers (DLN) and opened in 2019.

==== M+ Museum ====
The M+ Museum has three major focuses: visual art, design and architecture, and the moving image. Designed by Herzog & de Meuron, the museum opened in November 2021.

=== Batch 2 ===
==== Lyric Theatre Complex ====
The Lyric Theatre Complex will be a major performing arts venue in the WKCD, comprising a 1,450-seat theatre, a 600-seat medium theatre and a 250-seat studio theatre. A Resident Company Centre and extensive rehearsal facilities will be situated in the complex as well.

==== Centre for Contemporary Performance ====
The centre will include two Black Boxes.

=== Batch 3 ===
==== Hong Kong Palace Museum ====
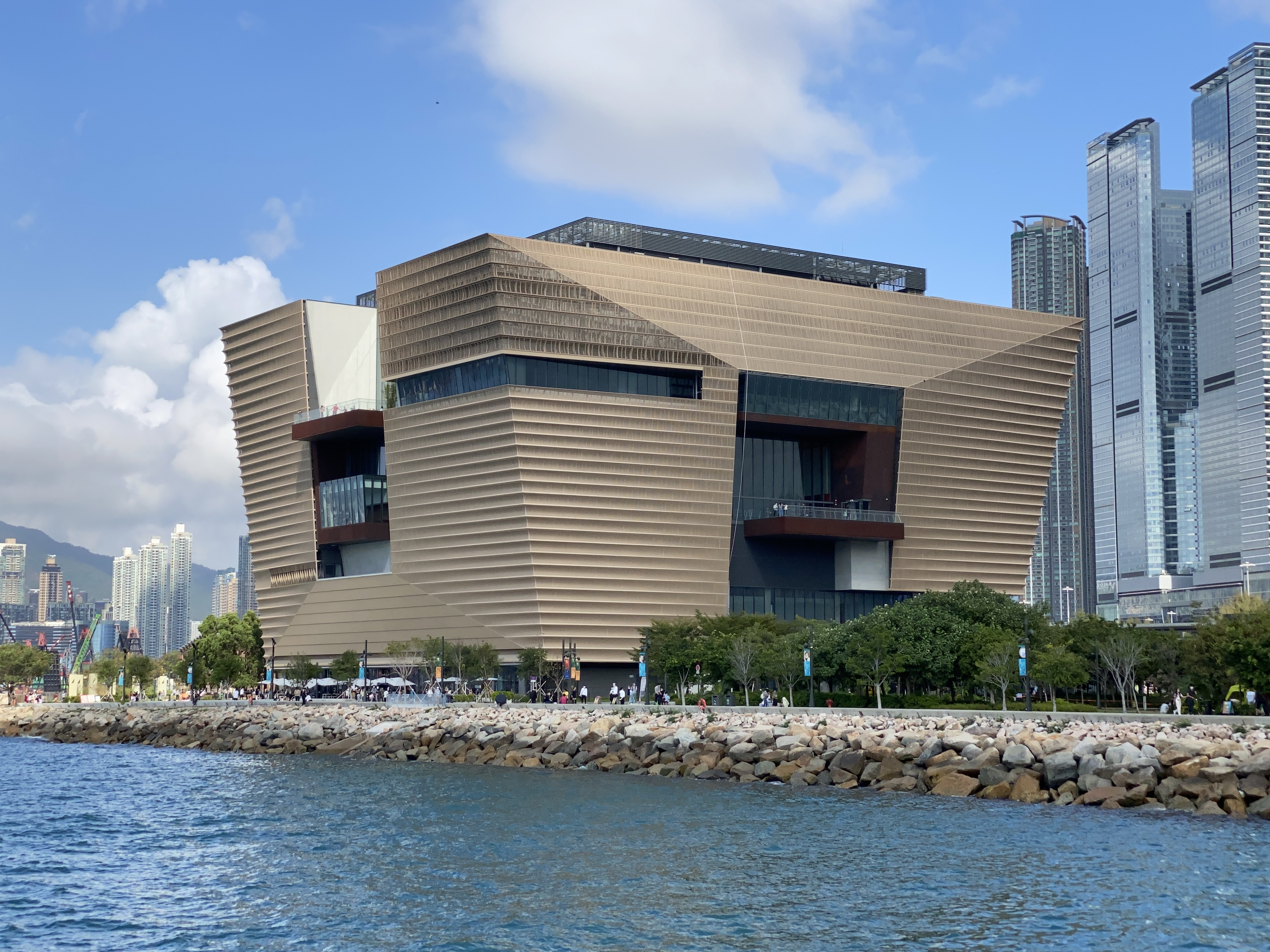
Hong Kong Palace Museum seen from Victoria Harbour

On 23 December 2016, Carrie Lam, then chair of the WKCDA, announced in Beijing that a new Hong Kong Palace Museum would be built on the southern part of the land originally slated for the Mega Performance Venue and Exhibition Centre. Occupying around 10,000 square metres, the floor area of the new Palace Museum is estimated at 30,500 square metres, housing two exhibition galleries, activity rooms, a 400-seat lecture theatre, shops and restaurants. The Hong Kong Jockey Club Charities Trust donated HK$3.5 billion for the design, construction and exhibition preparation works of the museum. Rocco Design Architects were commissioned to design the building. The museum opened on 3 July 2022 to commemorate the 25th anniversary of the handover of Hong Kong.

==== Mega Performance Venue (MPV) and Exhibition Centre ====
The MPV was planned as a performance venue with 15,000 seats. The board of the WKCDA, however, decided not to use the current Nursery Park as the site for the MPV. As of 2021, the Authority was presently considering developing the northern part of the coastal land as a medium-sized multipurpose venue for exhibitions, conventions and performances through privately financed initiatives.

Batch 3 will also accommodate additional projects under the working titles of Musical Theatre, Great Theatre, Music Centre, Medium Theatre, Xiqu Small Theatre and M+ Phase II. Some of these projects will require additional funding approvals and/or subject to review in the future by the WKCDA.

== Temporary usage ==
=== West Kowloon Waterfront Promenade ===
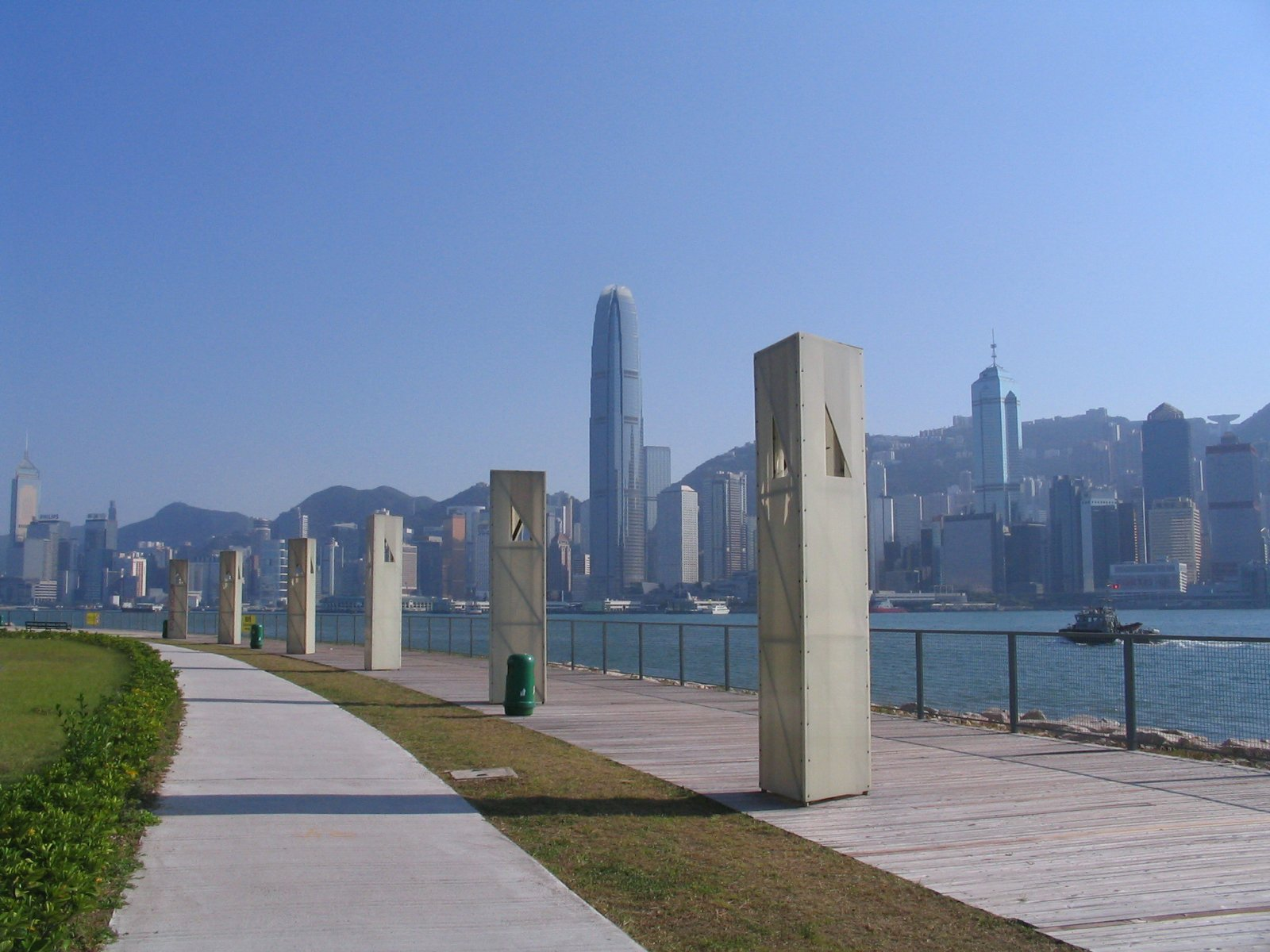
West Kowloon Waterfront Promenade

Part of the district's site is still used as a temporary promenade, the West Kowloon Waterfront Promenade, opened in 2005 and managed by the Leisure and Cultural Services Department. The promenade can be accessed from the east via Museum Drive or via a pedestrian entrance close to the bus station, to the west of the toll booths. Bicycles are available for hire for riding along a short waterfront cycle track, which will be removed when the site is developed.

== Development and history ==
The project has gone through multiple, well-publicised delays for nearly 20 years. The first phase opened in 2015, while the second phase is expected to be completed in 2026.

In 1996, the Hong Kong Tourism Board (HKTB) conducted a survey of visiting tourists, who cited a lack of cultural attractions. The HKTB proposed to LegCo in 1998 that new venues for the arts and cultural events be established. In his 1998 Policy Address, Chief Executive Tung Chee-hwa proposed the establishment of the West Kowloon Cultural District, endeavouring to develop Hong Kong as a cultural hub for Asia.

In April 2001, an international design competition was launched. Ten members of the judging panel selected a canopy design submitted by Foster and Partners as the winner under eight aspects. Leslie E. Robertson Associates were appointed as the structural engineering firm. However, the design was scrapped in 2005 due to intense public criticism with regard to financing models, the involvement of property developers, lack of planning, and the design itself. In 2006, the government established consultative committees to formulate a report on what facilities to offer and how they would be managed. In 2007, a three-month public consultation was carried out again, the early stages of which were completed in December 2007.

=== Invitation for proposals ===
In September 2003, the government announced an Invitation For Proposals for the Development of the district. While it required the provision of certain facilities, proponents were allowed considerable freedom, which meant that developers could sell residential and commercial space for profit. The requirements were:

- Three theatres with at least 400, 800 and 2,000, seats respectively
- A performance venue with at least 10,000 seats
- A cluster of four museums of at least 75,000 square metres (810,000 sq ft)
- An art exhibition centre of at least 10,000 square metres (110,000 sq ft)
- A water amphitheater
- At least four piazzas
- A canopy covering at least 55% of the development area

Three proposals, submitted by Dynamic Star International Limited, Sunny Development Limited and World City Culture Park Limited, were consulted on with the public from December 2004 to June 2005.

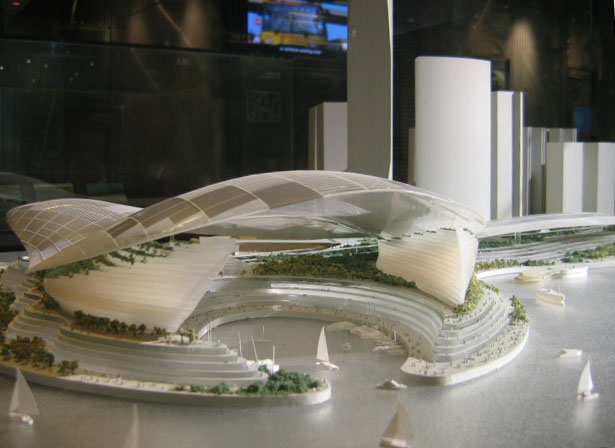
Foster and Partners's original design

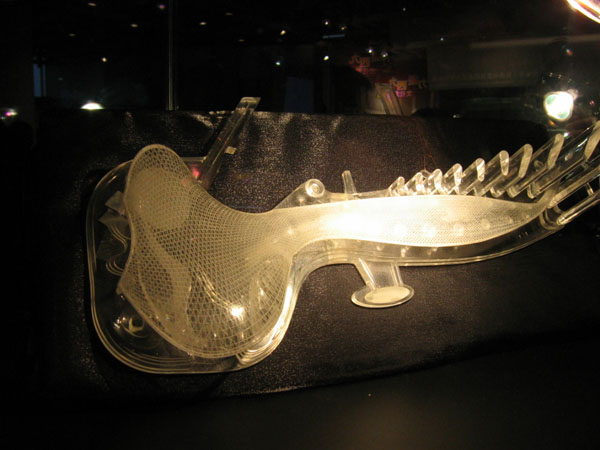
Dynamic Star International

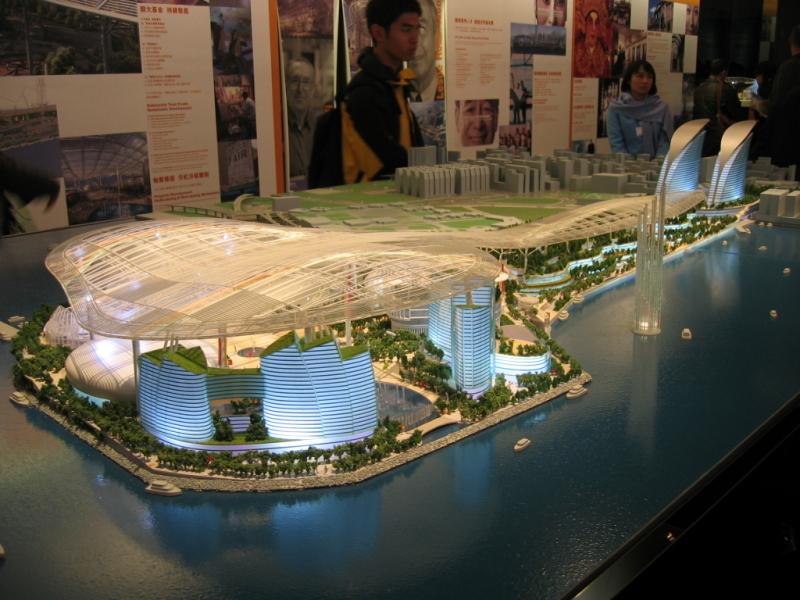
Henderson Land

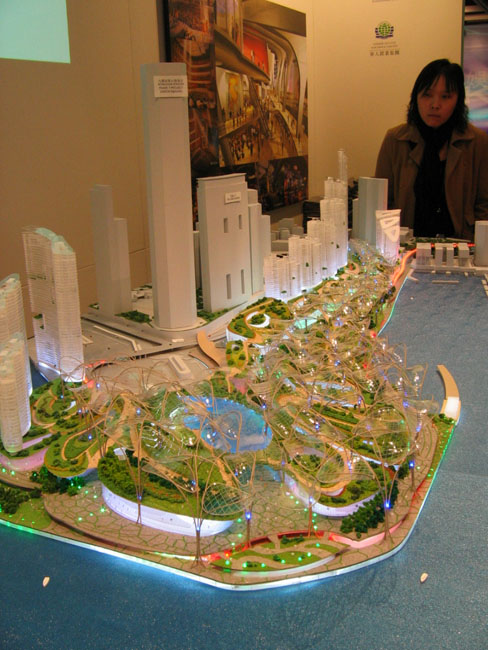
Yell Lin International

=== First public consultation ===
The executive summary of the consultation report showed that the single-package development approach, the large canopy, government supervision of the district and the concept of the project itself were among most questioned in the open question section of the consultation form. The report noted there was fear that the project could evolve into an ordinary property development project, common in Hong Kong. Over half of the written submissions were opposed to the canopy.

As the government renewed conditions for the development, the shortlisted proponents failed to renew their proposals and Chief Secretary Rafael Hui Si-yan said the much-criticised giant canopy – a centrepiece of the winning design by Foster and Partners – would be scrapped.

=== Consultative Committee and Public Engagement ===
The government appointed members to the Consultative Committee on the Core Arts and Cultural Facilities (CACF) of WKCD in April 2006 and the committee was scheduled to last until June 2007. It re-examined and re-confirmed the need for the CACF as defined in the Invitation for Proposals issued in September 2003. A Stage 1 Public Engagement Exercise was conducted from October 2009 to January 2010. Public forums and focus group meetings were held to understand the views and needs of the stakeholders and the public. Around 66 public engagement events were held. A Stage 2 Public Engagement Exercise followed, which sought to obtain feedback on the concept plans prepared by three planning teams, which incorporated public views learnt in Stage 1 into their conceptual plans.

=== Master Plan ===
The three conceptual plans were unveiled on 20 August 2010 by the WKCDA:

- City Park, prepared by Foster and Partners, led by Lord Norman Foster
- Cultural Connect, Key to Sustained Vitality, prepared by Rocco Design Architects Limited, led by Rocco Yim
- Project for a New Dimension, prepared by Office for Metropolitan Architecture, led by Rem Koolhaas

The Stage 2 Public Engagement exercise lasted three months and ran until November 2010.

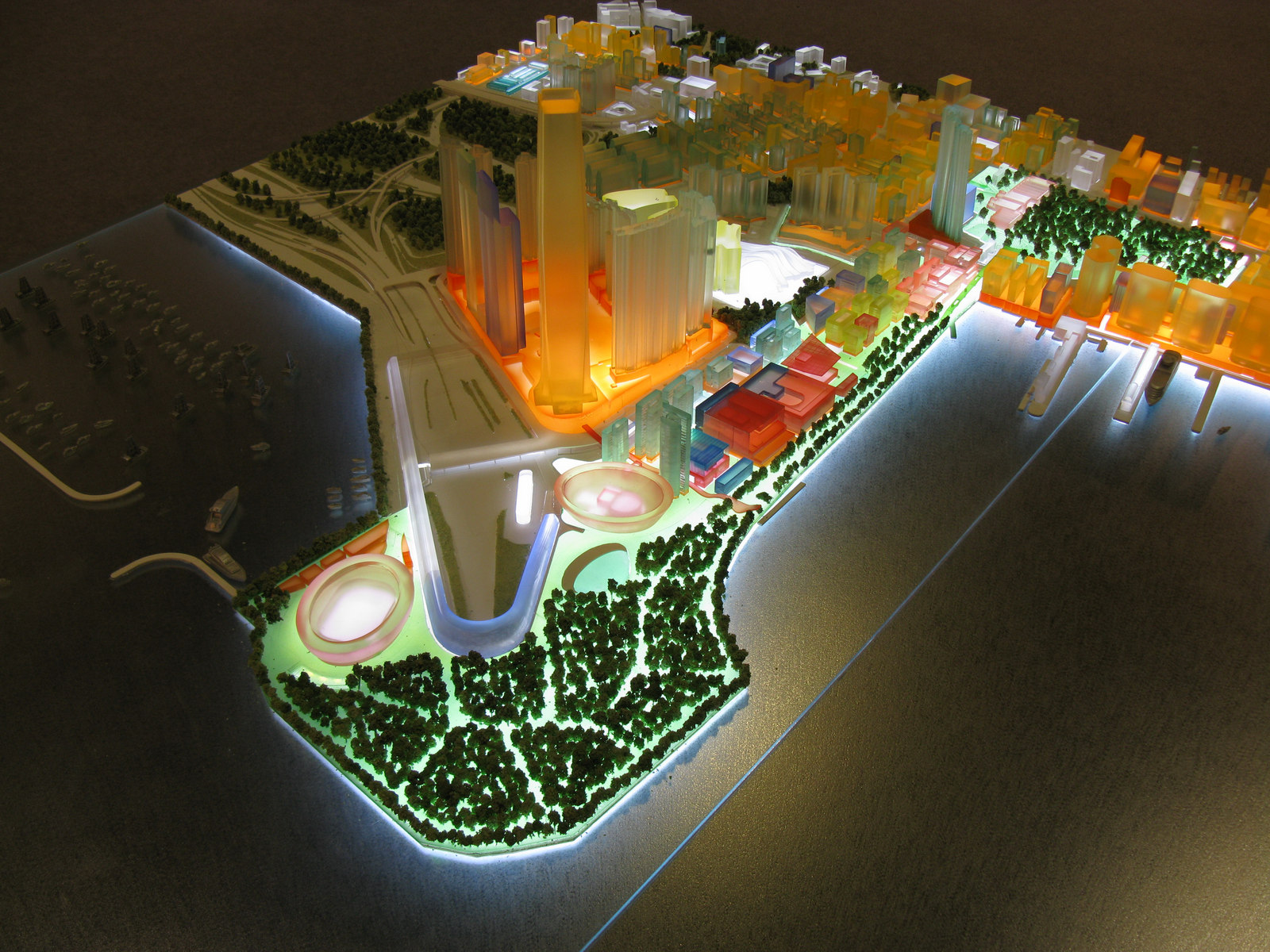
City Park (Foster + Partners)

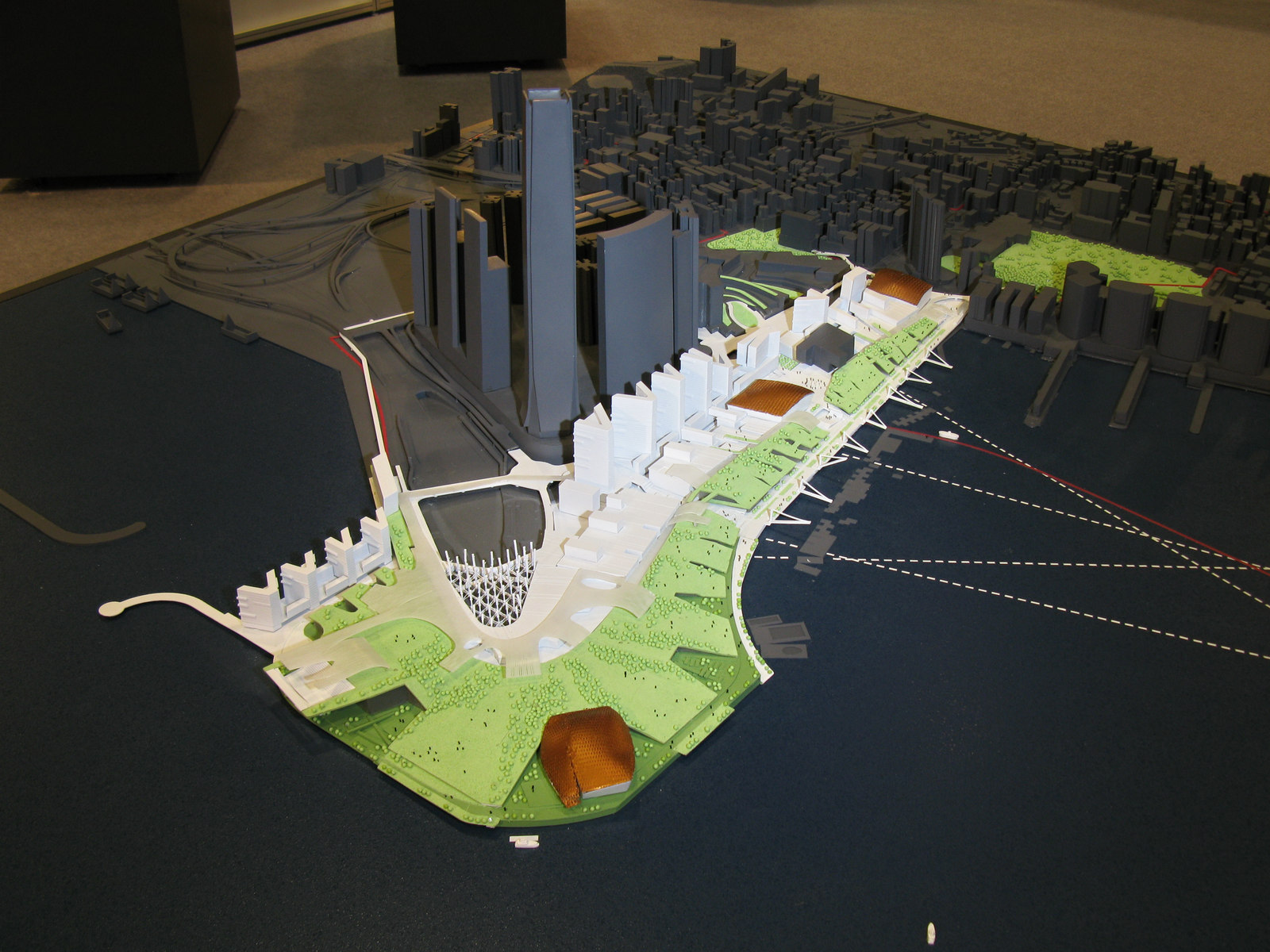
Cultural Connect Rocco Design Architects Limited

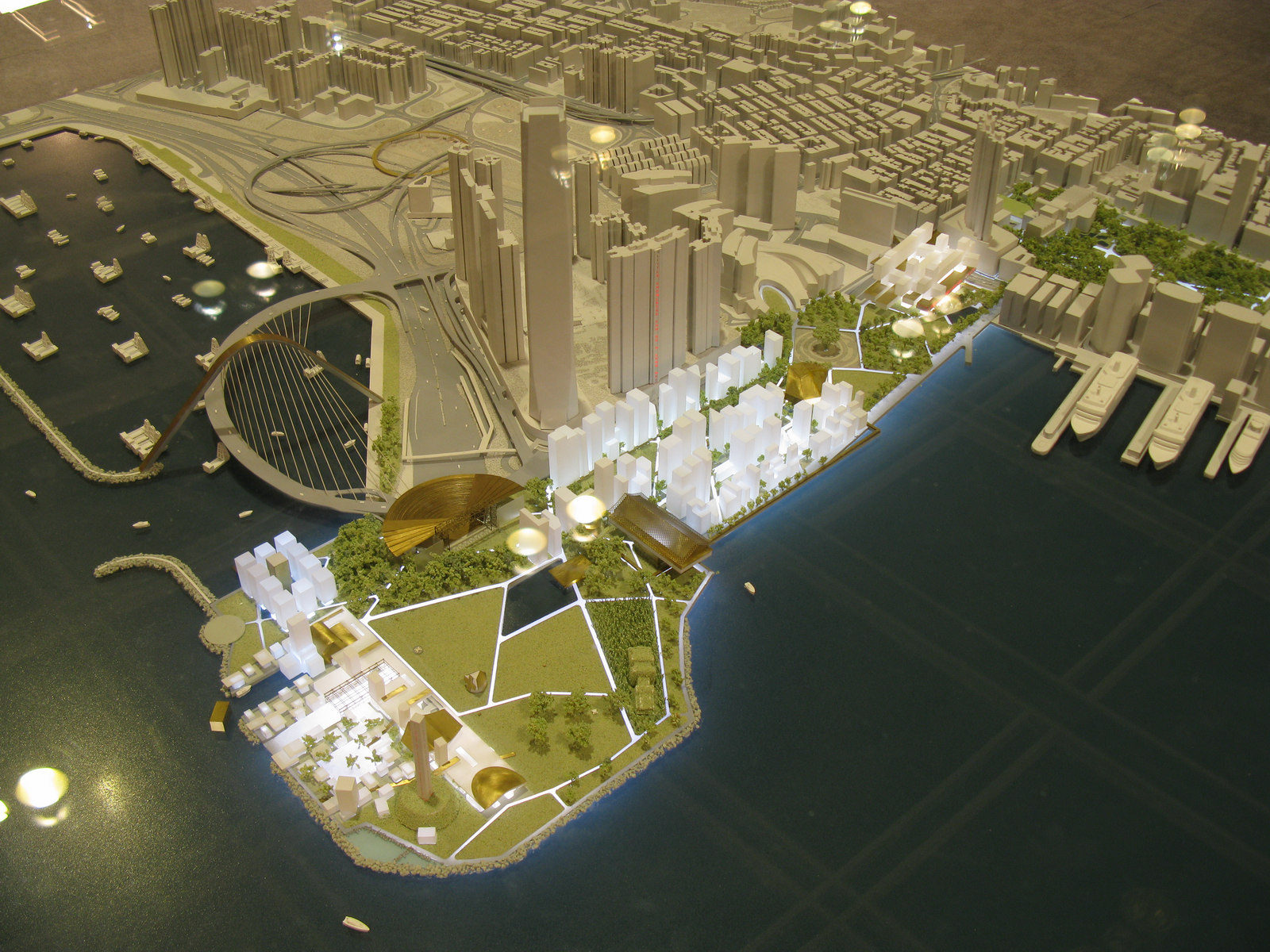
Project for a New Dimension (Office for Metropolitan Architecture

On 4 March 2011, Foster and Partners' plan, City Park, was selected as the master plan out of the three entries. Ronald Arculli, then head of the WKCDA, as well as of the selection board, said the master plan would be submitted to the Town Planning Board at the end of 2011. Construction could start as soon as the fourth quarter of 2012 with the first phase of the WKCD finished by the end of 2015. The plan was originally estimated to cost HK$21.6 billion. In October 2011, the government revised its cost estimates upwards, to over HK$29 billion.

The WKCD's Stage 3 Public Engagement Exercise began in September 2011 at the Hong Kong Heritage Discovery Centre. The focal point of the exhibition was a giant 1:250 physical model of the hub. A digital 3D model, photo montages and panels displaying key information and features were also presented. The plan – with public consultation running until 30 October – eventually went to the Town Planning Board, which subsequently gave the go-ahead by the end of next year.

== West Kowloon Cultural District Authority (WKCDA) ==
West Kowloon Cultural District Authority
- Abbreviation: WKCDA
- Legal status: Statutory authority
- Members: Private
- Chairperson CEO: Henry Tang Ying-yen; Betty Fung Ching Suk-yee
- Budget: HK$21.6 billion
- Website: http://www.wkcda.hk

The WKCD Authority was established under the West Kowloon Cultural District Authority Ordinance, Cap 601 to develop the West Kowloon Cultural district. It came into action on 11 July 2008. The authority is made up of a board, committees and executive board directors.

A board of directors was appointed in October 2008. Its chairman was former Chief Secretary Henry Tang Ying-yen, subsequent chairperson of the WKCDA. While government officials and experts were recruited to aid the authority operation temporarily, executives and managers were recruited to independently manage the operation.

The authority has an executive team of seven. Its first executive director, Angus Cheng Siu-chuen, a former executive at Hong Kong Disneyland, was appointed in June 2009 but resigned for personal reasons less than two weeks after taking up the post. Project Director Augustine Ng Wah-keung subsequently led the project on a provisional basis. On 24 March 2010, Graham Sheffield, formerly artistic director of the Barbican Centre, was appointed CEO of the authority on a three-year, HK$3.5 million-a-year contract. However, on 7 January 2011, he, too, suddenly resigned for "health reasons," just five months into the job. A recruitment exercise to replace Sheffield as CEO was subsequently launched, though the impact of these two top-level resignations worried critics. A member of the Legislative Council's home affairs panel, Tanya Chan, expressed fear at the time that candidates for the job could be deterred by the apparent problems with the project, ostensibly delaying the project until 2020.

On 27 May 2011, Michael Lynch, former Chief Executive of the Southbank Centre, was appointed CEO of the West Kowloon Cultural District Authority by Tang. Lynch resigned in 2015, citing family reasons, and was replaced by Duncan Pescod. A popular figure, Pescod was forced to resign from the WKCDA in 2020, not long before his term was due to end. Longtime bureaucrat Betty Fung Ching Suk-yee was subsequently appointed to the post in June 2021, assuming her duties on 15 October 2021 for a term of three years.

== See also ==
- Hong Kong cultural policy
