= Tristram Shandy (opera) =

Unfinished opera by Michael Nyman

Tristram Shandy is an unfinished opera project by Michael Nyman based on his favorite novel, The Life and Opinions of Tristram Shandy, Gentleman, by Laurence Sterne, begun in 1981. The project has been perpetually on hold for want of a commission, but at least five excerpts of the opera have been performed publicly, and one has been released on a commercial recording.

== Overview ==
The first excerpt of the opera appeared in 1983: "I'll Stake My Cremona to a Jew's Trump," (from Volume V, Chapter 15) which appeared in an eponymous short documentary by Sara Jolly. It was written for electric violin and viola, both players (originally Alexander Balanescu and Elisabeth Perry) also simultaneously singing. As with a number of Nyman works before and after, it is influenced by Wolfgang Amadeus Mozart's Sinfonia Concertante for Violin, Viola and Orchestra in E-flat, K. 364. The same year, he released "Love Is Certainly, at Least Alphabetically Speaking," for soprano and band, the text of which was derived from Volume VII, Chapter 12. The following year, Nyman premiered the choral work, "The Abbess of Andouillets."

In 1985, "Nose-List Song," the fourth section of the opera, made its premiere on the recording The Kiss and Other Movements. It was the first of Nyman's works to appear on a recording before being performed live. The song is based on "Slawkenbergius's Tale" from Volume IV, Chapter 1, which depicts a visitor to Strasbourg from the Promonotory of Noses. It collects together most of the statements made about the visitor by Strasbourg's residents. As recorded, it is performed as a solo by soprano Sarah Leonard. All of the statements are included in the lyrics sheet, but lines 3-8 of the final stanza are omitted on the recording. The vocal line is mostly, but not entirely, in monotone, with the majority of musical ideas carried by the instrumental music, melodies built on a harmonic pinning of the dominant sevenths A, F, B, and, D.

In 2001, Nyman premiered a dance he little thinks of, also intended for the opera score, derived from Volume VI, Chapter 1, written on a commission from Yorkshire.

None of this music appeared in Michael Winterbottom's film, Tristram Shandy: A Cock and Bull Story, for which Nyman is credited among the composers. Most of Nyman's music in that film is derived from the original soundtrack recording of Nyman's oft-recorded The Draughtsman's Contract. Nyman also includes his own arrangement of the Sarabande of George Frideric Handel that was featured famously in Stanley Kubrick's Barry Lyndon. This was included as a filmic reference to an eighteenth-century period classic and has not been suggested by Nyman as something he would include were he to complete the opera.
