= David Tremlett =

English artist (born 1945)

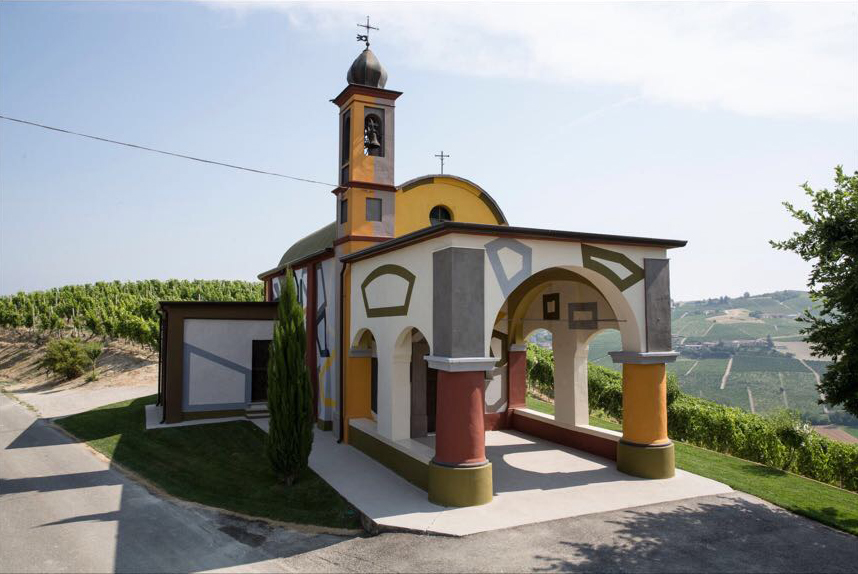
View of Portico, Chiesetta della Beata Maria Vergine del Carmine (Our Lady of Mount Carmel Church), Coazzolo, Piedmont, Italy 2017

David Tremlett (born 13 February 1945 in Dartford, Kent) is an English/Swiss sculptor, installation artist and photographer. He lives and works in Bovingdon, Hertfordshire, England. He is married to Laure Genillard who ran an art gallery in London which closed in 2022, they were married in 1987. Tremlett has a large collection of George Davidson 'Cloud Glass'.

== Biography ==
Tremlett was born in Dartford and came to Sticker, near St Austell, Cornwall at the age of 6 months where he grew up on his parents’ farm. He went to St Austell Grammar School, after which he attended Falmouth College of Art from 1962 to 1963. He was introduced to the college by Lionel Miskin and taught by Francis Hewlett (painting) and Ray Exworth (sculpture), before studying sculpture at Birmingham School of Art from 1963 until 1966 and then at the Royal College of Art in London. He travelled from the early 1970s in North America and Australia and from 1978 to 1987 in the Middle East and Africa.

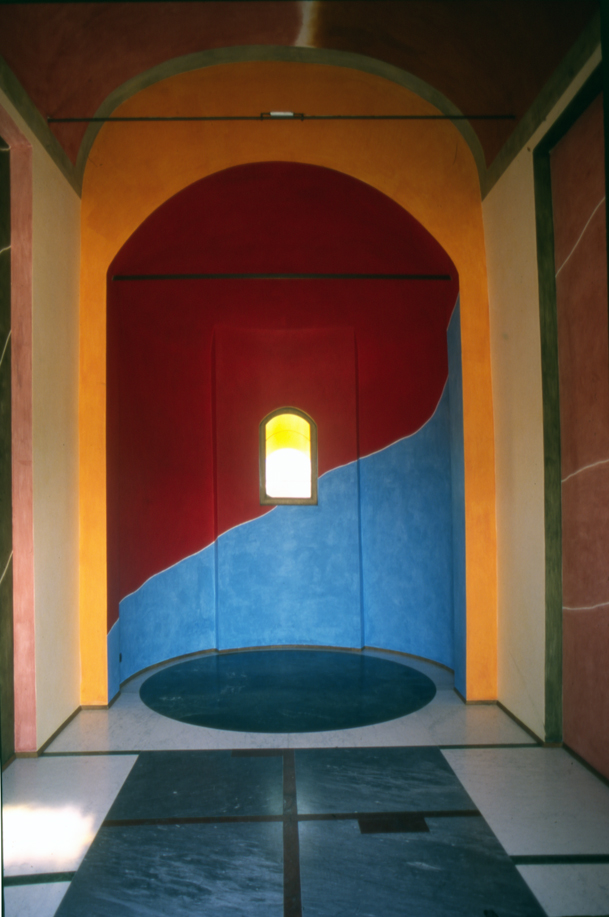
Interior Wall Drawings of the Cappella del Barolo, La Morra, Piedmont, Italy. With the aid of Ceretto Family

His first solo exhibition was with Nigel Greenwood Gallery in London in the early seventies, where he rose to prominence alongside artists such as Richard Long and Gilbert and George. Tremlett was making wall and floor drawings at that time — the first being in 1969 at the Grabowski Gallery, London. Since the 1980s, his primary media has been pastel, of which he says: "It is a fragile, delicate powder, so light that you can blow it away, but at the same time you can make something strong, demanding, and structurally tough." Despite the time and attention required by all of his site-specific works, Tremlett does not limit himself to locations that will ensure permanence. Indeed, many of his wall drawings exist for only a short period of time before they are weathered by natural elements or painted over in preparation for the next gallery show. Tremlett's palette has also been influenced over the years by his travel to execute site-specific works in places such as Malawi, India, Italy and Texas.

In 1992 he was shortlisted for the Turner Prize "for his many wall drawings displayed around the world, most notably at the Kestnergesellschaft in Hanover."

Since the late 1970s, he has been creating wall drawings notably at the British Embassy in Berlin, the British Council Building in Nairobi, Kenya (designed by Squire and Partners in 2004) and the Capella Delle Brunate at La Morra, Barolo with his friend Sol LeWitt. His stained glass windows for the Church of St. Peter and St. Paul in Villenauxe-la-Grande in France were completed in 2005. The South Lobby of the Bloomberg Building, City of London was completed in 2017.

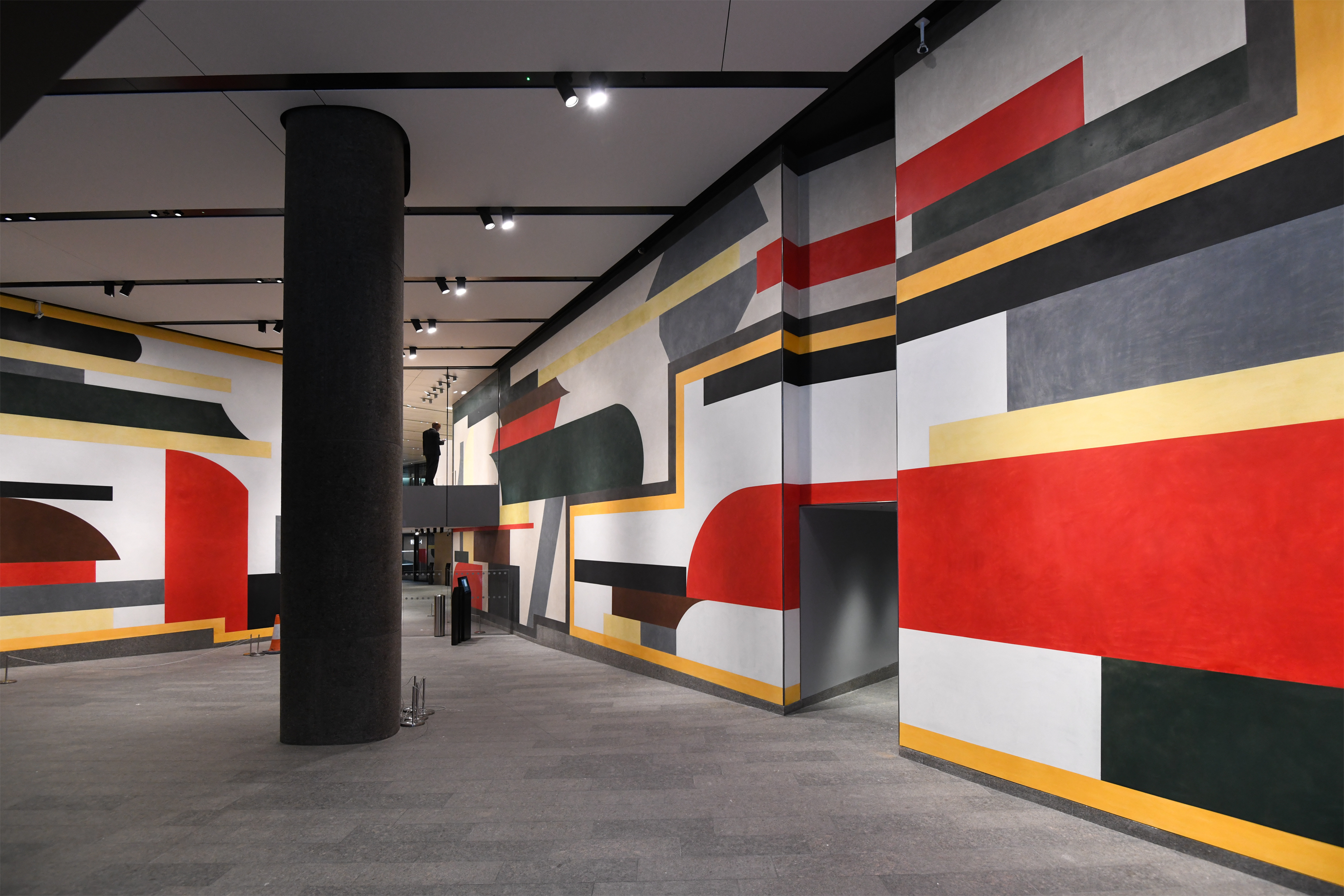
"City Drawing" Bloomberg London 2017

Tremlett has exhibited internationally in private galleries and major museums with 10 catalogues and many artist books to his credit. His exhibition history includes solo exhibitions at The Tate Gallery, now Tate Britain, in London; Centre Georges Pompidou in Paris; the Stedelijk Museum in Amsterdam; Museum of Grenoble; Pecci Museum, Prato, Italy; and the Museum of Modern Art in New York. He has 190 Solo Exhibitions to his history as an Artist. In 2011 he was asked to create a work for the entrance of the Manton Hall at Tate Britain titled 'Drawing for Free Thinking' it spans 450 sq. metres, in 2023 the work was erased.

In 2012 he exhibited "New work on Paper" at Gering & López Gallery in New York City.

In 2013 a large set of wall drawings were made for the Ikon Gallery in Birmingham.

In 2015 was made an 'Honorary Citizen of La Morra, Piedmont' A small town above the Capella Della Brunate, where he and Sol LeWitt worked in 1999.

In 2016 completed the exterior of the Chiesetta di Coazzolo in Piedmont, Italy, where he was made an 'Honorary Citizen'

In 2017 completed the Lobby of the South Building for Bloomberg London.

In 2019 made wall paintings for the complete street Via di Mezzo in Ghizzano, Tuscany, Italy.

In 2019 completed the exterior of three chapels in Rossa, Grisons, Switzerland.

Between 2019 and 2021 completed 11 ceiling drawings for The Palazzo Butera in Palermo, Sicily.

In 2022, he created Wall Drawing OUT and Wall Drawing IN at the Horti Borromeo of the Collegio Borromeo in Pavia.

With more than 30 Artists books and 28 Personal Catalogues published since 1974.

Major Catalogues include In Space / Nello Spazio, 2021 - published by Palazzo Butera, Palermo, Sicily - Walls 2001-2010, 2010, Forte di Bard Aosta, Italy - David Tremlett Retrospective 1969/2006, 2006 - Musee Grenoble/Pecci Museum, Prato It. Grenoble / Prato, France & Italy - Se I Muri Potessero Parlare (if walls could talk), 2001 published by Mazzotta Milan, Italy - Wall Drawings, 1995, published by Carre d'Art & Juan Miro Foundation, Barcelona Nimes, France - David Tremlett, 1993, published by Padiglione d'Arte Contemporanea Milan, Italy - David Tremlett, 1992, published by Kestner Gesellschaft Hannover, Germany - David Tremlett at the Serpentine gallery, 1989, published by Serpentine Gallery London, United Kingdom - Dates Different, 1987, published by Musee Chateau Rochechouart Rochechouart, France:

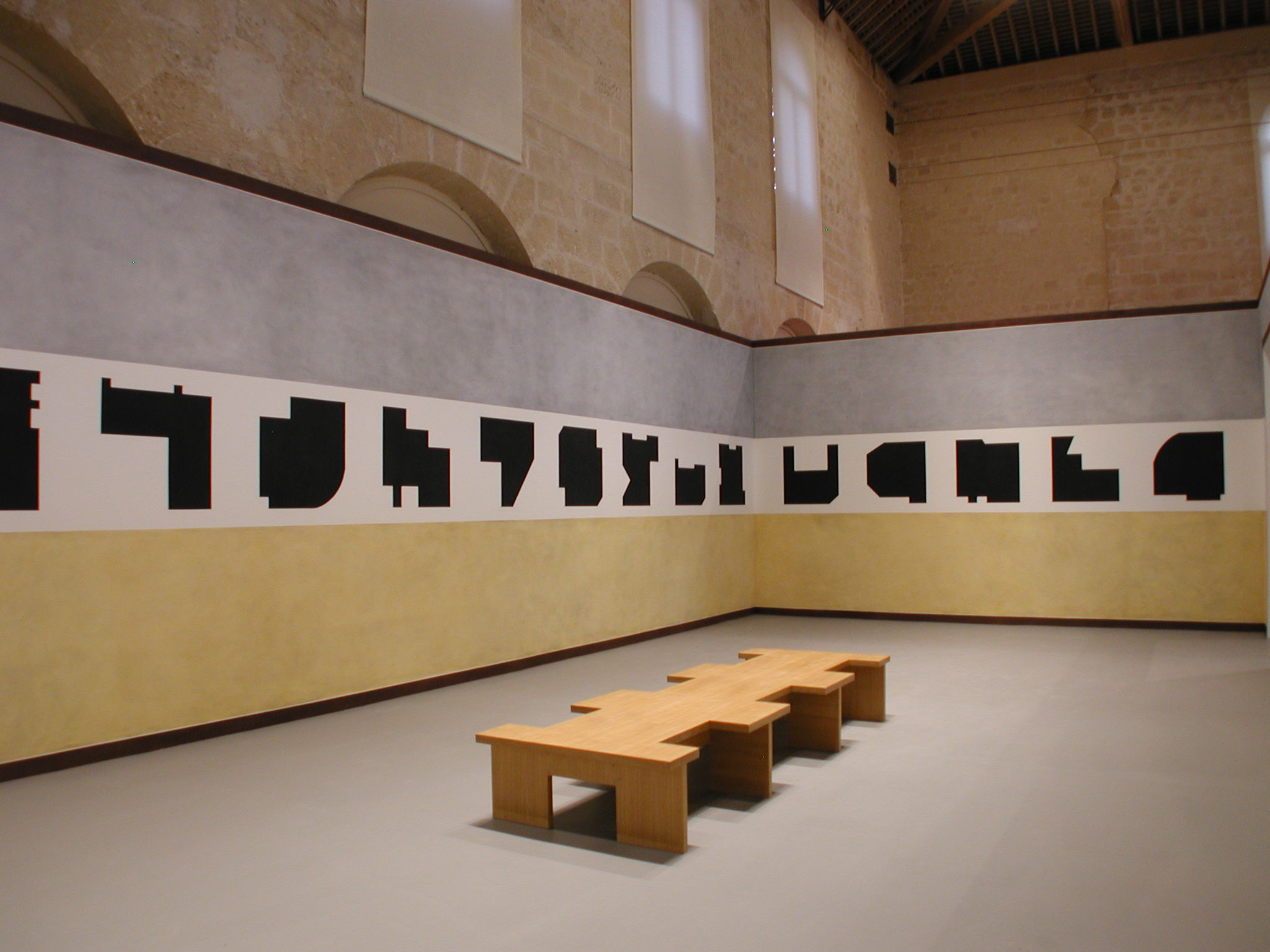
F.R.A.C., Picardie, France, 1993

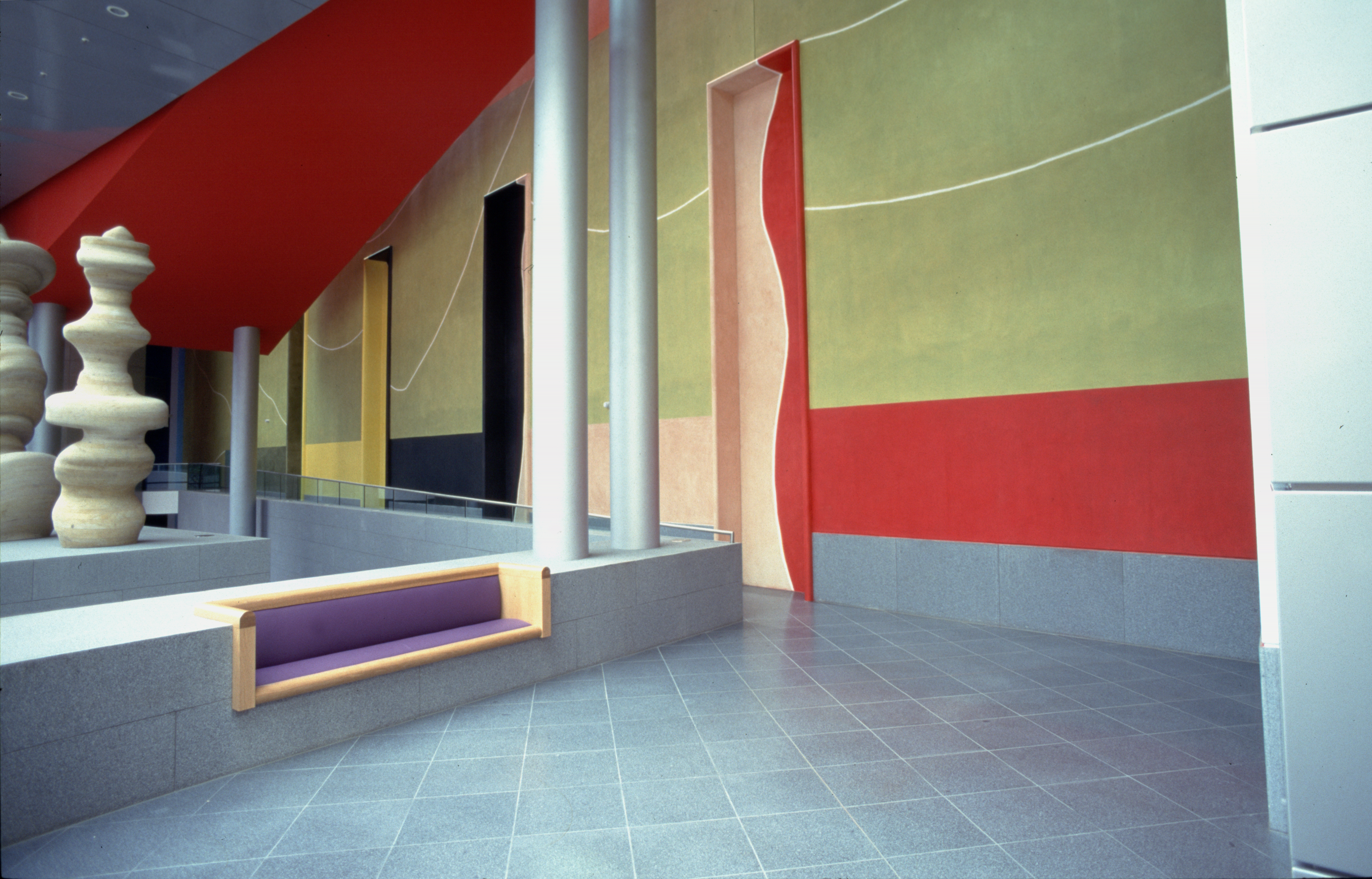
Walls of British Embassy, Berlin, 2000
