= Graham Sheffield =

Graham Edward Sheffield CBE (born 1952) is Director Arts for the British Council. He was previously Chief Executive Officer of Hong Kong's West Kowloon Cultural District Authority (WKCDA) and Artistic Director of the Barbican Centre in London.

Sheffield founded the South Bank Centre's Meltdown Festival and at the Barbican co-created the now long-running BITE (Barbican international theatre events), which was introduced to replace the departing resident Royal Shakespeare Company.

Sheffield is also a regular writer, lecturer and broadcaster on arts-related issues, including on the role of arts in international diplomacy and the potential impact of the UK leaving the European Union

== Recent Work ==
Sheffield was head of the WKCDA from August 2010 to January 2011, before leaving allegedly for health reasons.

Since taking up the role of the British Council's Director Arts in 2011, Graham has led the British Council’s arts programme through a period of major expansion including the launch of a fund to support Cultural Heritage around the world in partnership with the Department for Culture, Media and Sport; supporting artists in the Middle East; and major seasons of arts work such as Transform in Brazil to link the 2012 and 2016 Olympic Games host countries.

Graham became Chair of Help Musicians UK, the UK’s largest music charity, in 2014, when he also joined the Board of Rambert Dance Company.

== Early career ==
Graham was born in London, studied classics and music at Tonbridge, and graduated as BMus (Hons) from the University of Edinburgh in 1975. After a short spell studying stage management, he joined the BBC as a Music Producer on Radio 3, initially programming all recorded opera on the network. During his 12 years at the Corporation, Graham produced several documentaries and dramatised features, as well as programmes on Indian Classical Music (Ragas and a Republic). He produced Music Weekly with Michael Oliver from 1982 to 1987. One programme "Tasting Notes" won the Sony Radio Award for Best Feature in 1990.

From 1990 to 1995, Graham worked at the South Bank Centre as Music Projects Director, planning the South Bank's own presented music series and partnering with the resident orchestras and ensembles. In 1993 he founded the Meltdown Festival, which continues to this day.

In 1995 Graham moved to the Barbican, where in partnership with John Tusa, he worked to build the Centre's reputation across the art forms. 1998 saw a major year long initiative called Inventing America, as well as the start of a regular international theatre season called BITE, introduced to replace the departing resident RSC company.
