= Paul Richards (artist) =

British figurative painter

Paul Richards (born 1949) is a British figurative painter and part-time lecturer at the Slade School of Fine Art.

Richards was tutored by Ray Exworth at Falmouth, and studied at Saint Martin's School of Art and Maidstone School of Art. He came to prominence in the 1970s for performance-based art he produced with Bruce McLean in Nice Style, the world's first pose band.

Richards paints portraits and still life. 17 of his oil paintings are in UK public art collections, such as Arts Council England and the Tavistock and Portman NHS Trust Foundation.

== Exhibitions ==
=== Solo ===
1967: Robert Self Gallery, London
1977: Battersea Arts Centre, London
1981, 82, 83: Lewis Johnstone Gallery, London
1985: ‘Red Rite’, Riverside Studios, London;‘Love Dance’, Connaught Brown, London
1988,90: Connaught Brown, London
1991: Denis Hotz Fine Art, Johannesburg
1992,94: Connaught Brown, London
1995: Carling Dalenson, Stockholm
1996,98: Connaught Brown, London
1996: Dalenson Gallery, Naples, Florida
2003,06: Connaught Brown, London
2009Crisis of Identity: 22 January – 28 February 2009 – Connaught Brown Gallery, London

=== Group ===
1972: ‘The British Thing’, Oslo
1973: ‘Critics Choice’, Tooth Gallery, London;‘Deep Freeze’ (performance), Hanover Grand, London
1974: ‘A Problem of Positioning’ (performance), Architectural Association, London
1975: ‘End of an Era’, Robert Self Gallery, London
1979: ‘The Masterwork’ (performance), Riverside Studios, London
1982: ‘Collazione Inglese’, Venice,‘The New Classicism’, Bremio Lubiam, Italy
1983: New Purchase Exhibition, Arts Council Collection, National Theatre, London;‘The Formal and Informal’, Gallery of Modern Art, Bologna
1984: APERTO 84, Venice Biennale
1985: ‘Room at the Top’, Nicola Jacobs Gallery, London;Festival d’Eté de Seine Maritime, Rouen
1987-88: ‘The Arts for Television’, touring Exhibition – venues included: Stedelijk Museum, Amsterdam; The Museum of Modern Art, New York; Musée National d’Art Moderne, Centre Georges Pompidou, Paris; Tate Gallery, London
1991: Recent Purchases, Contemporary Art Society, Camden Arts Centre, London
1994: Summer Exhibition, O’Hara Gallery, New York
1997: ‘Wait and See (What’s for Dinner)’, Towner Art Gallery, Eastbourne
2004–05: ‘Tom Bendhem: Collector’, Contemporary Art Society Touring Exhibition

== Publications ==
- Fenner, Felicity, and Paul Richards (1996), A Certain Fiction, Florida OCLC 40924538
