= Bamboo scaffolding =

Type of scaffolding

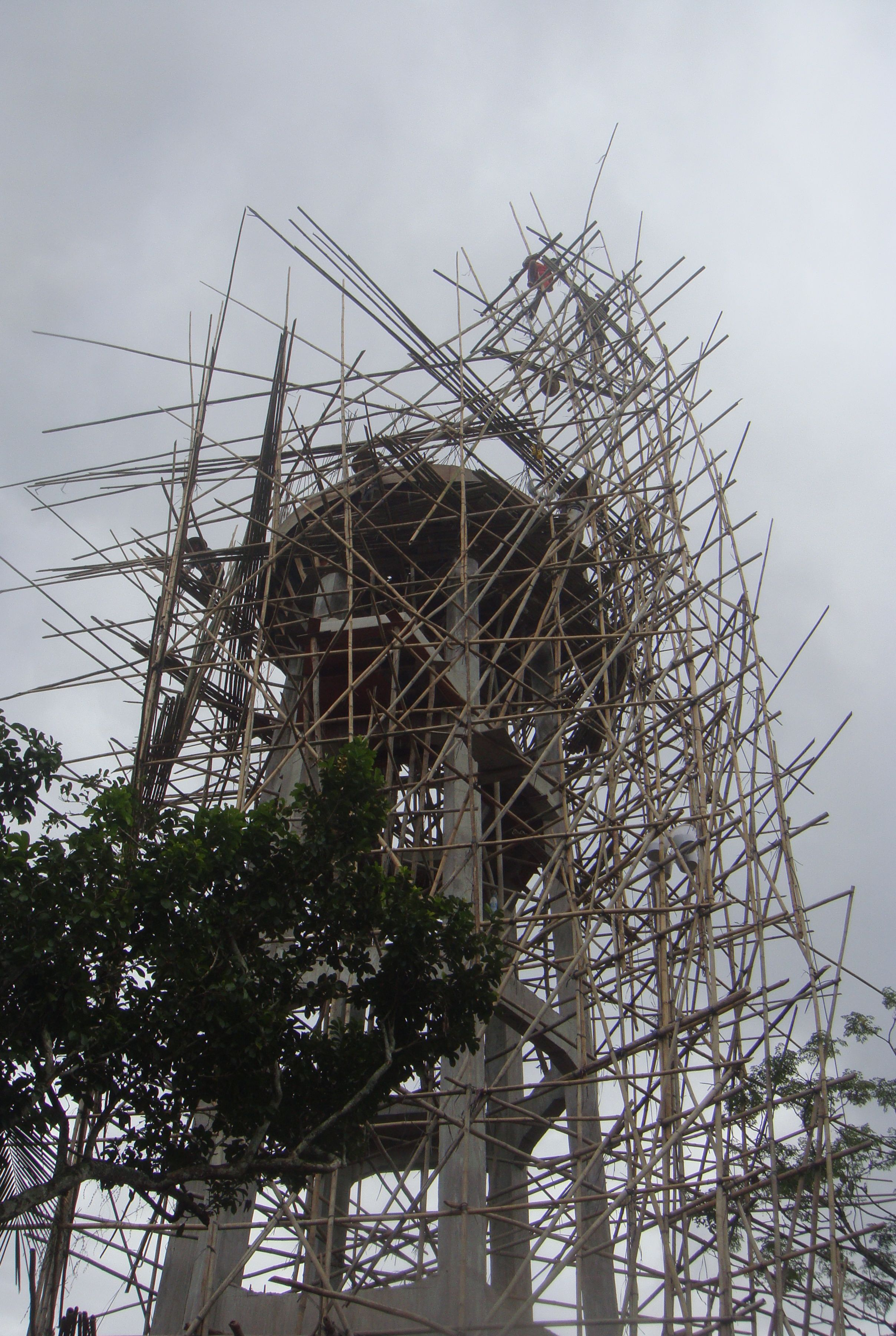
Bamboo scaffolding an under-construction water tower in Hainan, China

Bamboo scaffolding has been widely used in construction work for centuries. Many landmarks, notably the Great Wall of China, were built using scaffolding made from bamboo, and its use continues today in some parts of the world.

In Hong Kong, the traditional technique using bamboo scaffolding to build temporary Chinese opera theatres is recognized as an item of Intangible Cultural Heritage. West Kowloon Bamboo Theatre and Tsing Yi Bamboo Theatre serve as examples of the technique being used.

== History ==
=== 1800s: Origin ===
Bamboo scaffolding was first introduced into the building industry in Hong Kong immediately after colonization in the 1800s. It was widely used in the building of houses and multi-story buildings (up to four stories high) prior to the development of metal scaffolding, but still used in warmer climate countries due to metal's heat conductivity concerns. It was also useful for short-term construction projects, such as framework for temporary sheds for Cantonese opera performances.

=== 2000s: Gradual decline ===
In 2013, there were 1,751 registered bamboo scaffolders and roughly 200 scaffolding companies in Hong Kong. The use of bamboo scaffolding is diminishing due to shortages in labor and material. Despite the lack of labor force and material, recently safety issues have become another serious concern.

The labor shortage may be due to the reluctance of younger generations to become scaffolders as it has a reputation of being "a dirty and dangerous job". Another reason fewer people are becoming scaffolders is that new recruits need to undergo training with the Hong Kong Construction Industry Council in order to acquire a license. Older scaffolders generally learned in apprenticeships, and may have been able to gather more hands-on experience.

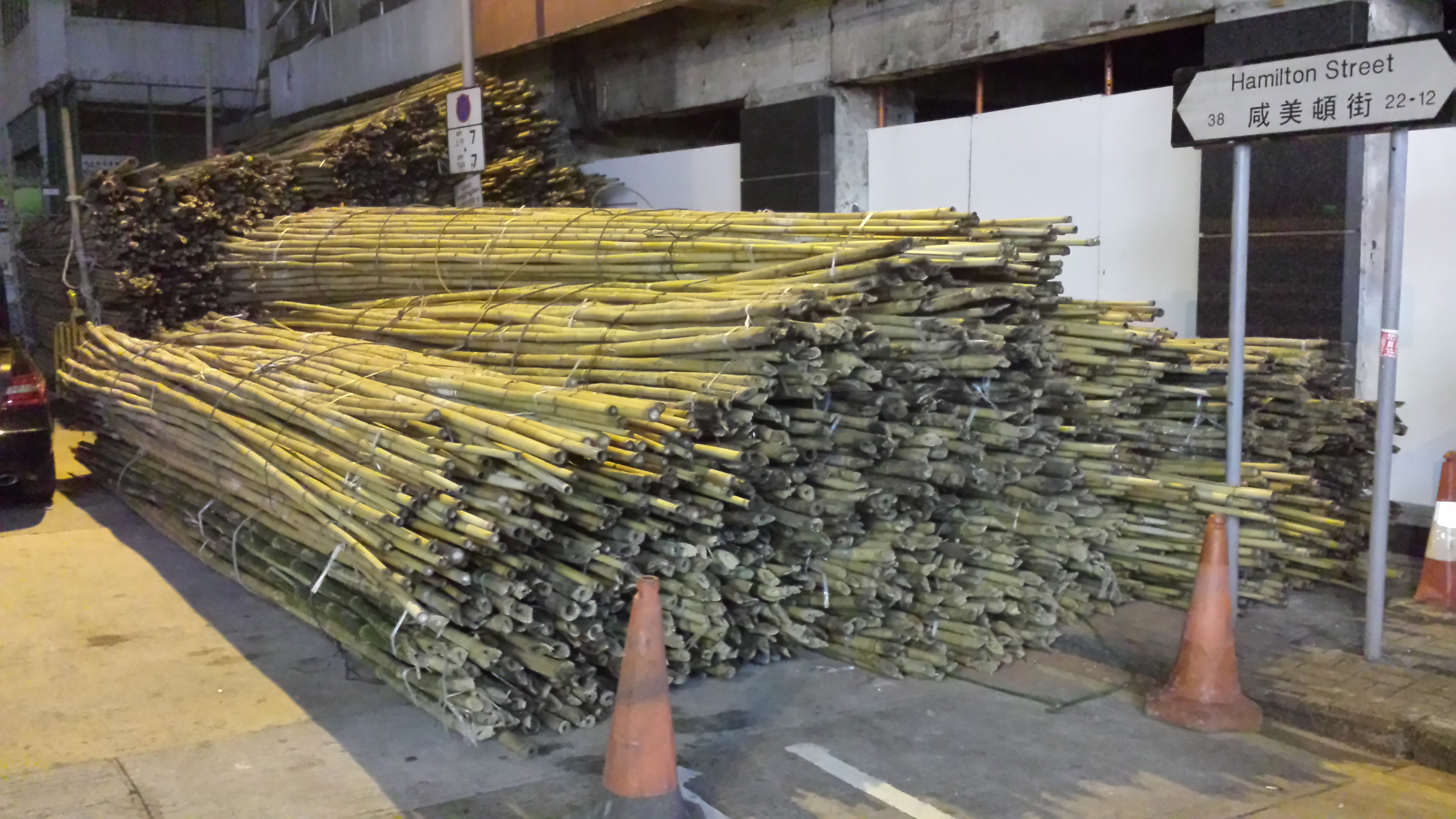
Disassembled bamboo scaffolding material in Hong Kong.

Material shortages are also a contributing factor to the decline. The bamboo scaffolding material was imported from mainland China. Bamboo—which matures after three years to the wide diameter and thick skin perfect for scaffolding—came from the Zhaoqing area in Guangdong. Over the past two decades, firms have had to look to Guangxi instead. The industry's fear is that one day supplies will be blocked due to export embargoes and environmental concerns. Attempts to import bamboo from Thailand, or switch to synthetic or plastic bamboo, have so far proved unsuccessful.

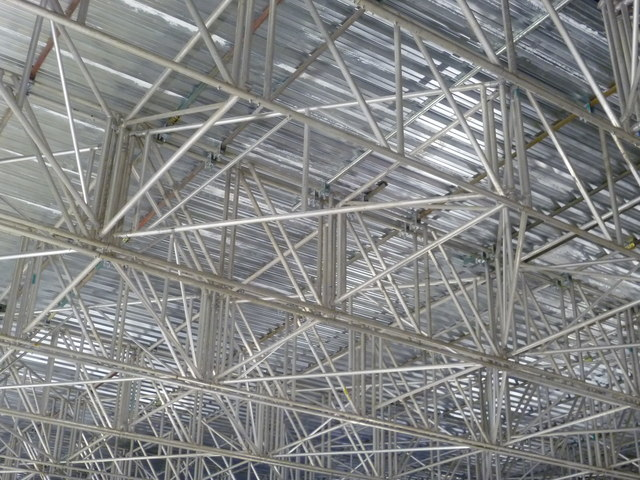
Metal scaffolding.

While mainland China had moved on to using metal scaffolding, Hong Kong's construction industry has remained with the early Chinese construction practice. On 17 March 2025, Hong Kong government authorities announced that they would begin to phase out the use of bamboo and replace it with metal scaffolding, stating that bamboo deteriorates over time, has contributed to 23 deaths in scaffolding related accidents since 2018 up to that date, and is combustible.

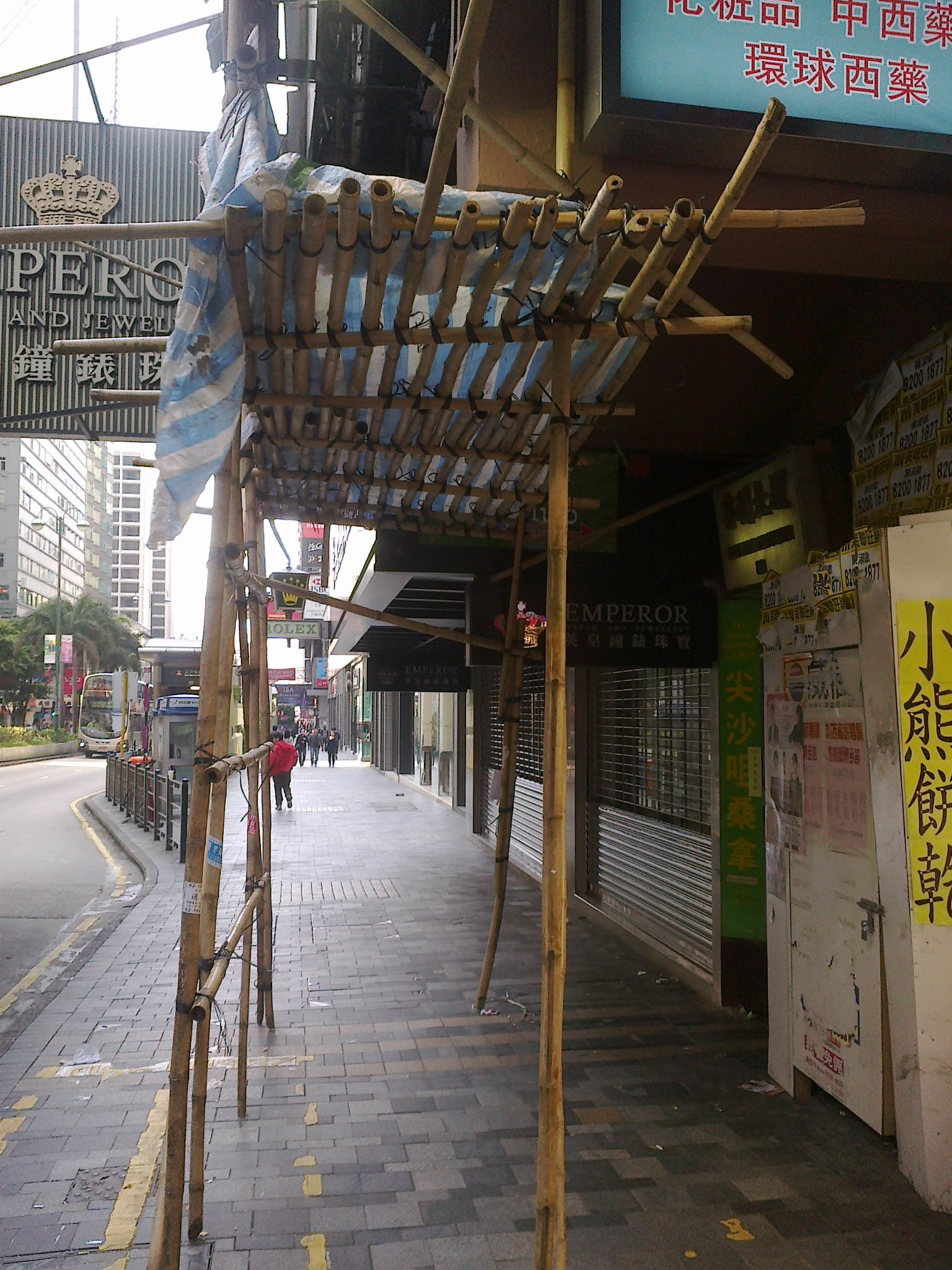
Double-row bamboo scaffolding in Hong Kong.

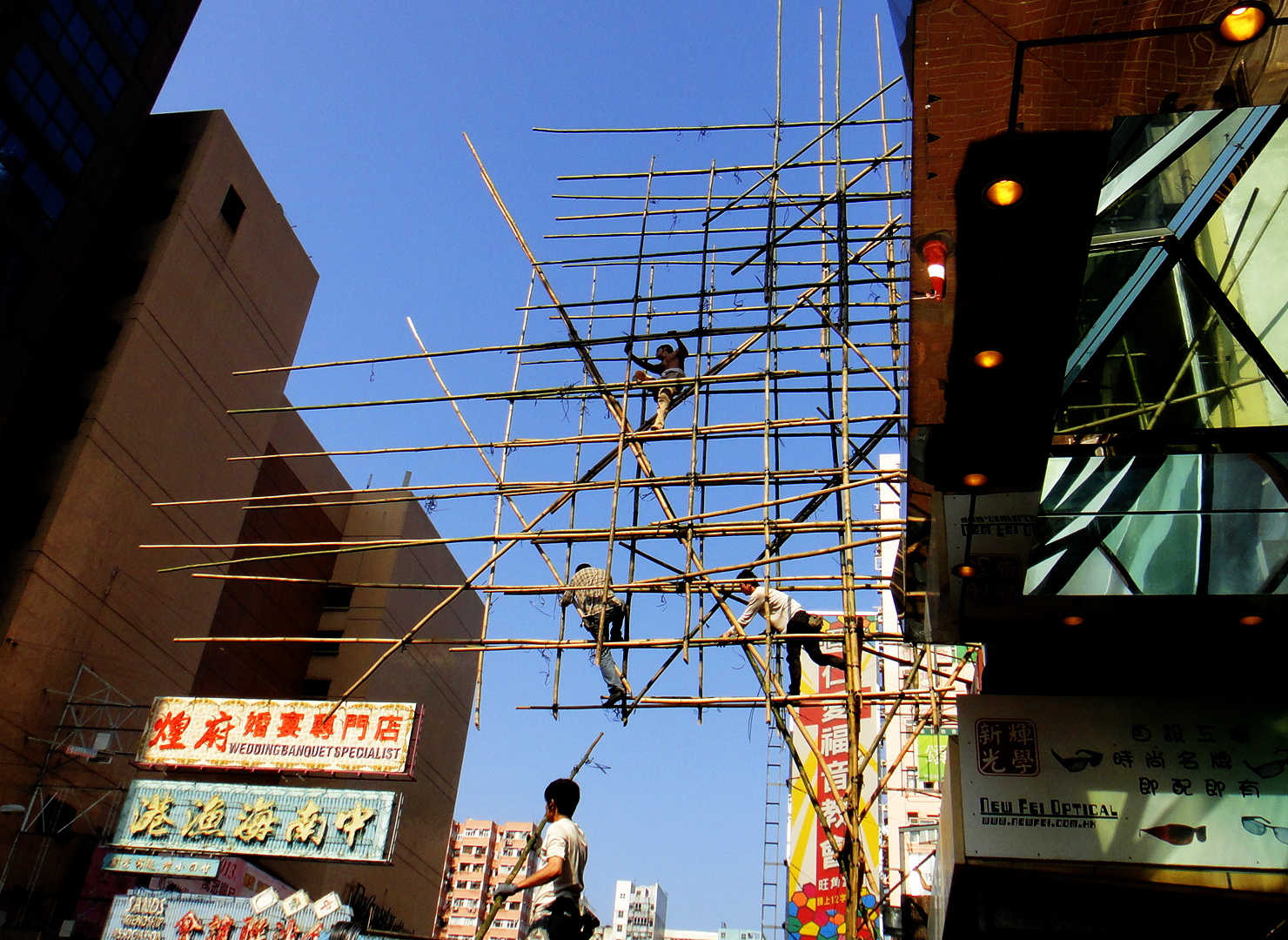
A fulcrum supports this "Extended bamboo scaffolding" in Hong Kong.

== Types ==
There are three types of scaffolding in Hong Kong.

=== Double-row scaffolding ===
"Double-row scaffolding" is the most comprehensive type, used for entire building construction or major renovations. It features two parallel layers of vertical posts (standards) set some distance from the building, with working platforms laid between them to provide ample space for workers and materials.

=== Extended bamboo scaffolding ===
"Extended bamboo scaffolding", also known as "truss-out scaffolding", is a smaller-scale working platform. It is often cantilevered or "juts out" from the side of a building for minor repair and maintenance work, such as fixing external pipes or spalling concrete, and generally does not exceed 6 meters in height.

=== Shop-signs bamboo scaffolding ===
"Shop signs of bamboo scaffolding", These are specifically designed for the installation or maintenance of large, often overhanging, signboards. Similar to the Extended bamboo scaffolding, they are typically cantilevered structures, supported by steel wires or hanging posts attached to the main structure of the building above, and have a specific length-to-height ratio (maximum 4:3).

== Safety standards ==
=== Hong Kong ===
Hong Kong legally enforces specific safety criteria for all bamboo scaffolding installations. Key stipulations include standards for pole spacing, the tensile strength of the nylon binding, and the diameter of the bamboo members. Furthermore, the raw bamboo material is subject to a preparation requirement, needing at least 90 days of indoor air-drying prior to its deployment on site. The relevant safety standards are updated on a regular basis.

=== India ===
India's construction sector operates under specific codes governing temporary structures built with bamboo. These standards dictate precise requirements concerning the material used for securing joints, the quality and age of the bamboo poles, and the methods employed for tying the connections during the scaffold's erection.

== Uses in construction ==
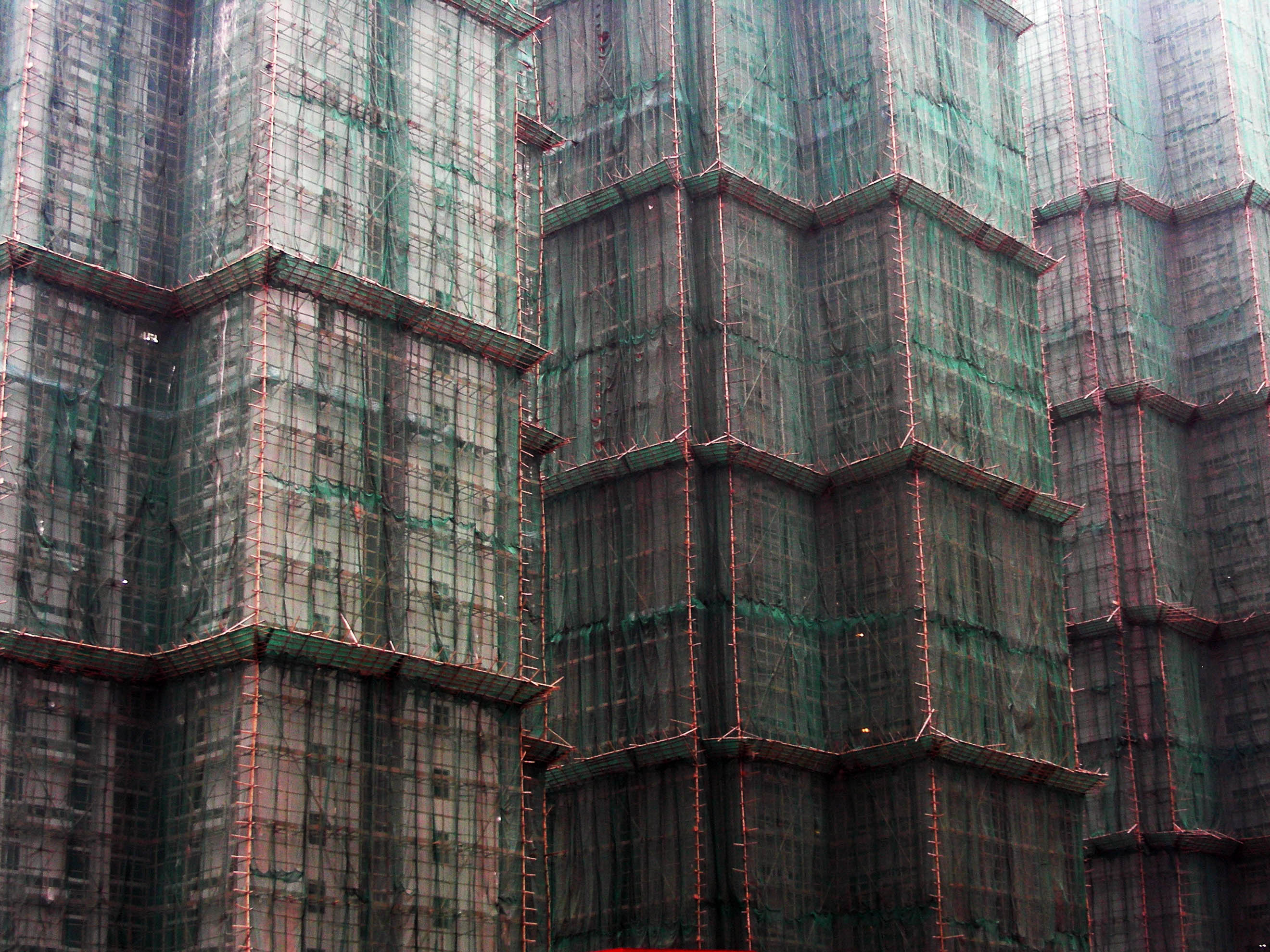
Bamboo scaffolding used for building tall buildings in Hong Kong.

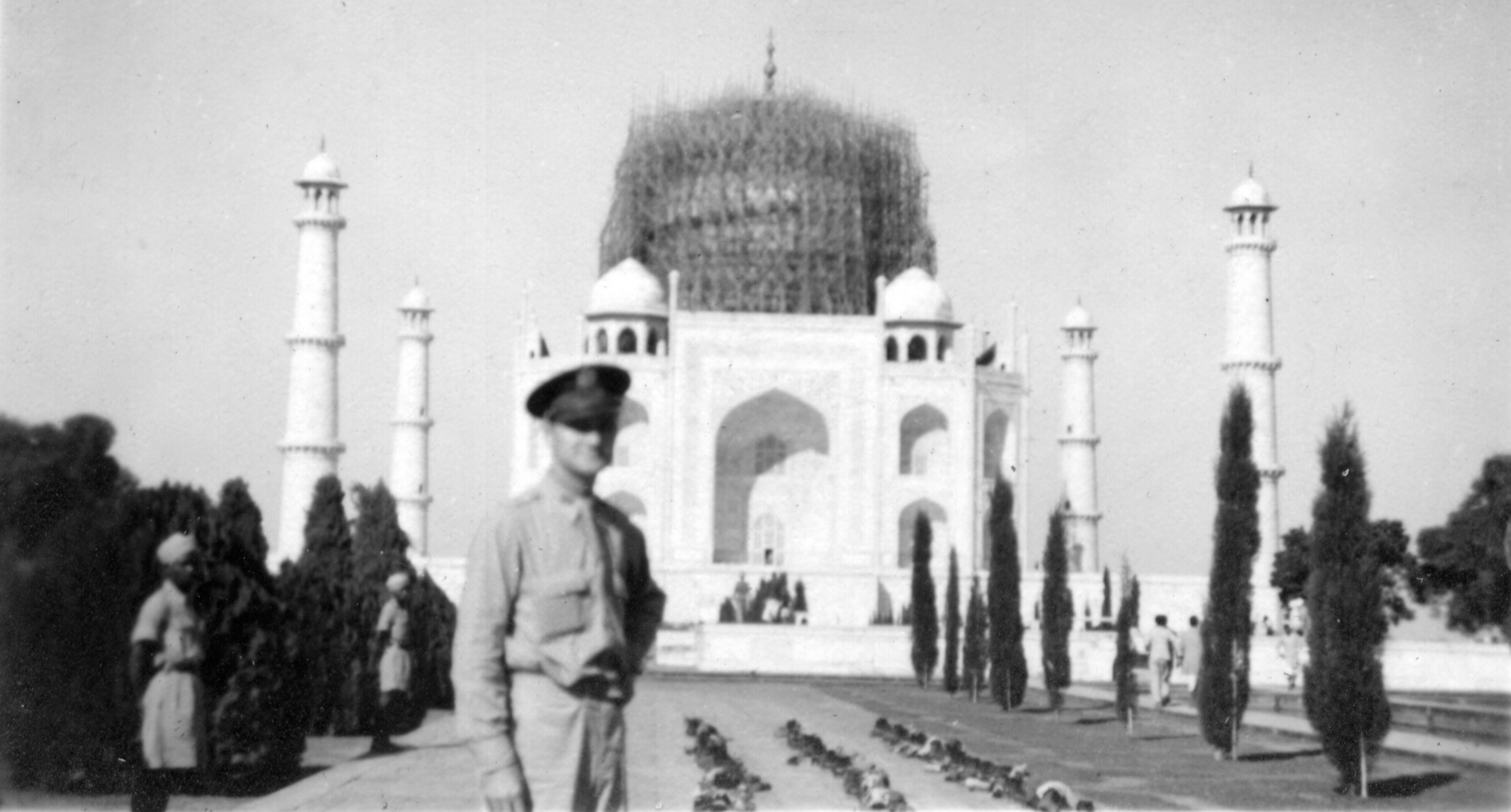
Protective scaffolding over the Taj Mahal in Agra in India, c. 1943.

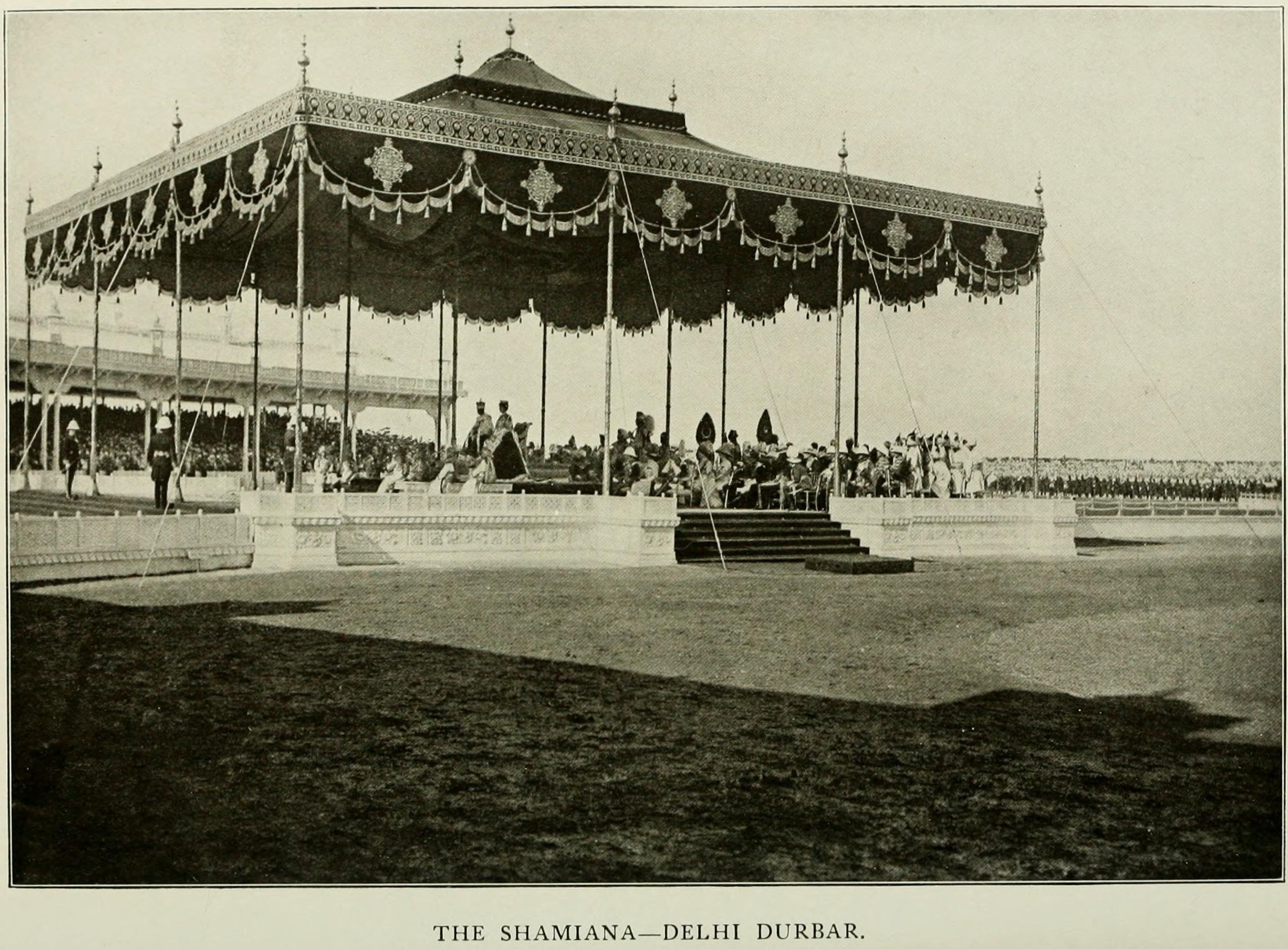
The temporary shamiana built for darbar (emperor's court) during colonial British raj in India.

Bamboo scaffolding is a temporary structure to support people and materials when constructing or repairing building exteriors and interiors. In bamboo scaffolding, plastic fibre straps and bamboo shoots are bound together to form a solid and secure scaffold structure without screws. Bamboo scaffolding does not need to have a foundation on the ground, as long as the scaffolding has a fulcrum for structural support.

=== Developing world ===
Bamboo scaffolding is commonly used in developing countries across Asia and Africa, including India, Bangladesh, Sri Lanka, Indonesia, and Nigeria. In many African countries, notably Nigeria, bamboo scaffolding is still used for small scale construction in urban areas. In rural areas, the use of bamboo scaffolding for construction is common. In fact, bamboo is an essential building and construction commodity in Nigeria; the bamboo materials are transported on heavy trucks and trailers from rural areas (especially the tropical rain forest) to cities and the northern part of Nigeria.

=== Use for recreational venues ===
Some of the structures in relaxation and recreation centres, both in urban and rural areas of Nigeria, are put in place using bamboo materials. Bamboo materials are still used in the construction of some local restaurants in rural areas.

== Cultural use ==
=== Chinese opera theatres ===
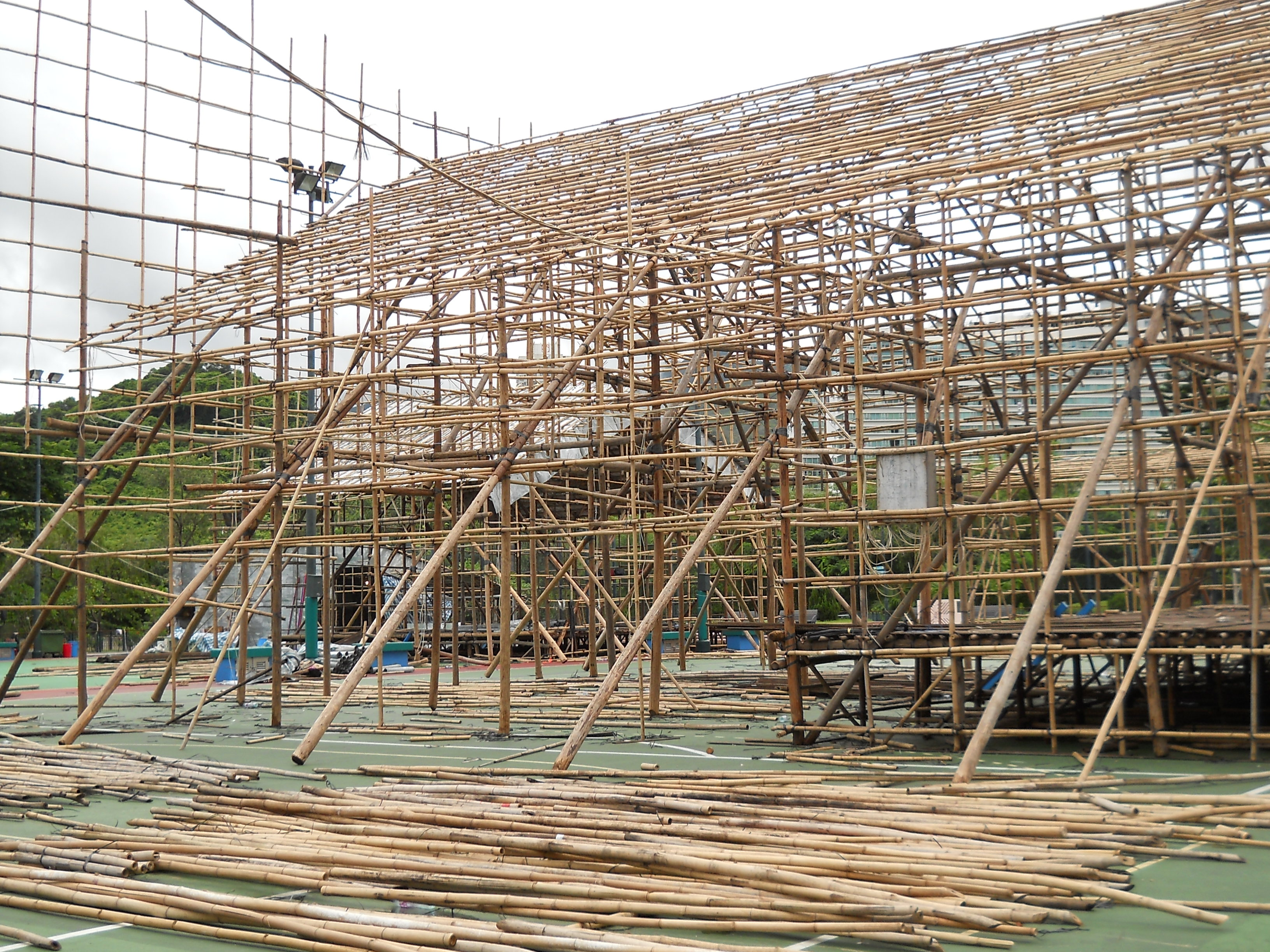
A temporary stage being erected with bamboo scaffolds

One of bamboo scaffolding's main alternative uses is in Chinese opera theatres in Hong Kong. The flexibility and convenience of this type of scaffolding suits stages set up for temporary use and also separates the audience from the performers.

Respecting and promoting the traditional cultures of Chinese opera, a huge event called the West Kowloon Bamboo Theatre was held next to the Tsim Sha Tsui Fire Station, at the junction of Canton Road and Austin Road in 2012 and 2013. The event was then held at the West Kowloon Waterfront Promenade annually since 2014.

=== Local festivals ===
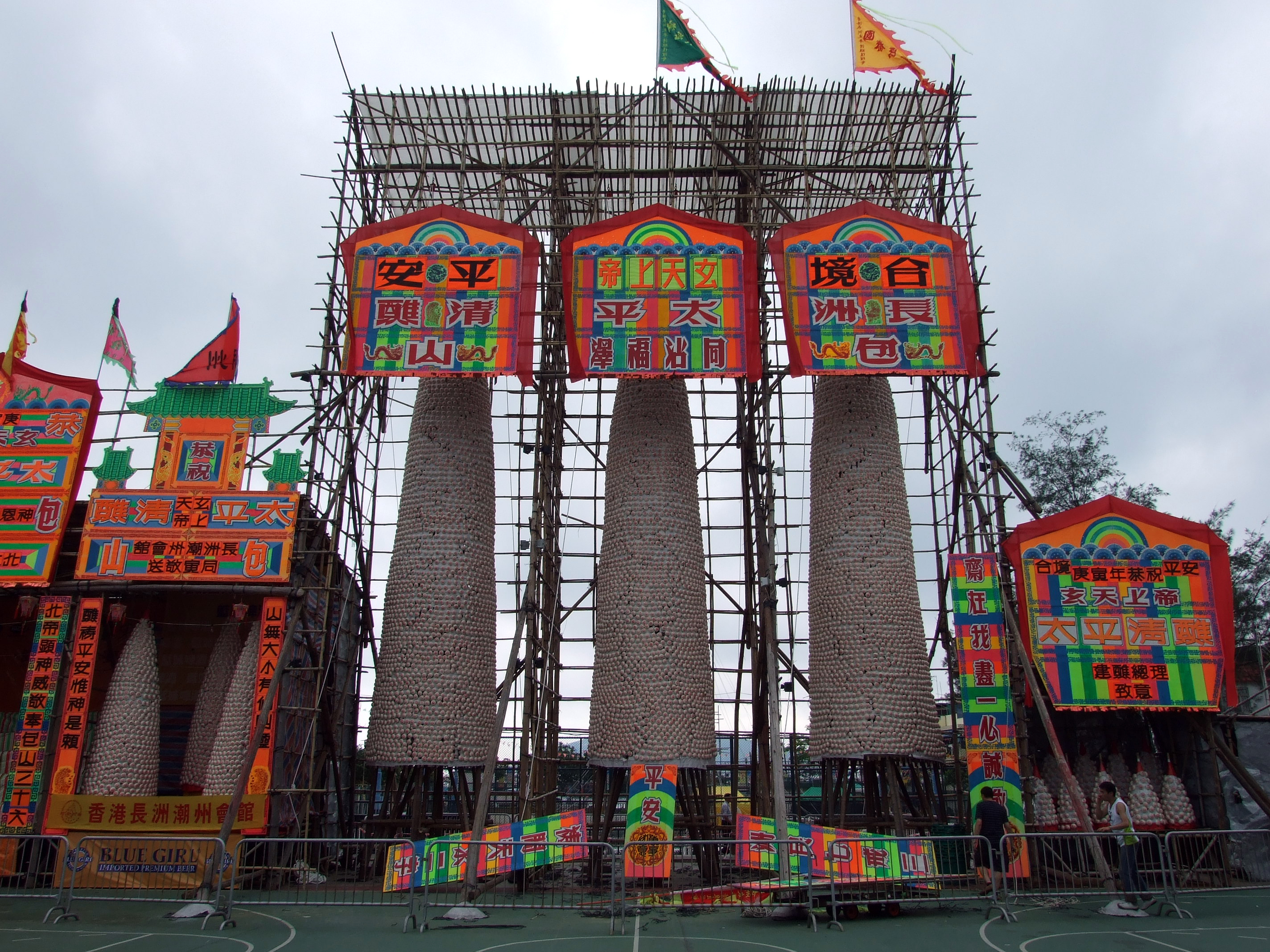
Bamboo scaffolds and bun towers in Cheung Chau

Stages are built from bamboo scaffolding for the live Cantonese and Teochew operas performed during every Ghost Festival to worship ghostly ancestors.

The bamboo tower used in the Bun Scrambling Competition during the Cheung Chau Bun Festival on the island of Cheung Chau is constructed out of bamboo scaffolding. Nine thousand buns, representing fortune and blessing, are supported on the fourteen-meter tall bamboo tower in front of the Pak Tai Temple. For the Piu Sik Parade, bamboo stands and racks are used to hold the young costumed performers above the crowds.

== See also ==
- Types of specialty scaffoldings
