= Clockenflap =

Annual music festival in Hong Kong

- Genre: Multimedia, music, Indie rock, film, installation art, Electronic music
- Dates: 4–6 December 2026 (upcoming)
- Locations: Cyberport, Hong Kong; West Kowloon, Hong Kong; Central, Hong Kong
- Years active: 2008–present
- Founders: Jay Forster, Mike Hill, Justin Sweeting
- Website: www.clockenflap.com

Clockenflap Music and Arts Festival, commonly abbreviated to "Clockenflap", is an annual music and arts festival held in Hong Kong. It incorporates international, regional and local live music, film, art installations, street, and kids' area. 60,000 people attended the 2015 event, which was widely considered HK's marquee music event of the year.

== History ==
Clockenflap was founded in 2008 and is organized by Jay Forster, Mike Hill and Justin Sweeting. Their stated goals for the festival are to nurture the Hong Kong arts, music and film scene and "put the city on Asia's contemporary media-arts circuit". The NME credits Clockenflap for the "pioneering role it has played in nurturing the Hongkong indie and alternative music scenes, as well as bringing International talent to Hongkong audiences".

The first Clockenflap festival was held in a concrete public space in the Cyberport housing development, in front of 1500 attendees. It later expanded to the West Kowloon Cultural District before moving to the Central Harbourfront.

== Festivals ==
=== Clockenflap 2025 ===
Clockenflap 2025 was held from 5 December to 7 December 2025 in Central Harbourfront Event Space.

=== Clockenflap 2024 ===
Clockenflap 2024 was held from 29 November to 1 December 2024 in Central Harbourfront Event Space.

=== Clockenflap 2023 ===
Clockenflap 2023 was held from 3 to 5 March 2023 and from 1 to 3 December 2023 in Central Harbourfront Event Space.

=== Clockenflap 2021 ===
Clockenflap 2021 was curtailed due to restrictions on international travel, tightened rules and regulations on outdoor events, and a requirement for a seated audience with no food or drink consumption on site.

=== Clockenflap 2020 ===
Clockenflap 2020 had to be postponed due to the coronavirus pandemic.

=== Clockenflap 2019 ===
Clockenflap 2019 was scheduled to be held from 22 to 24 November 2019 in Central Harbourfront Event Space. The organisers cancelled the event due to the 2019–20 Hong Kong protests.

=== Clockenflap 2018 ===
Clockenflap 2018 was held from 9 to 11 November 2018 in Central Harbourfront Event Space.

=== Clockenflap 2017 ===
Clockenflap 2017 was held from 17 to 19 November 2017 in Central Harbourfront Event Space.

=== Clockenflap 2016 ===
Clockenflap 2016 was held from 25 to 27 November 2016 in Central Harbourfront Event Space.

=== Clockenflap 2015 ===
Clockenflap 2015 was held from 27 to 29 November 2015 in West Kowloon Waterfront Promenade.

=== Clockenflap 2014 ===
Clockenflap 2014 was held from 28 to 30 November 2014 in West Kowloon Waterfront Promenade.

=== Clockenflap 2013 ===
2013's festival extended to a 3-day event and grew to over 30,000 people attending with 7 music stages with new additions of a Cabaret Tent and an Arts Village. The festival was held from 29 November to 1 December in West Kowloon Waterfront Promenade.

=== Clockenflap 2012 ===
Held once more on the West Kowloon Waterfront Promenade, the festival site expanded to allow for six performance stages, a dedicated children's entertainment area. Over 25,000 people attended the festival over the weekend of 1 to 2 December.

=== Clockenflap 2011 ===
Clockenflap 2011 took place from 10 to 11 December 2011 and was the first to be held at the festival's iconic new location, the West Kowloon Waterfront Promenade. Unlike previous (and preceding) years, it was completely free to the public when late stage venue restrictions prevented the sale of tickets.

=== Clockenflap 2010 ===
Due to various restrictions, the third Clockenflap was a one-night festival held in Blindspot Annex in Wong Chuk Hang on Saturday, 20 November 2010.

=== Clockenflap 2009 ===
The second Clockenflap festival was a two-day festival held on Saturday-Sunday, 7–8 November 2009 at Cyberport.

=== Clockenflap 2008 ===
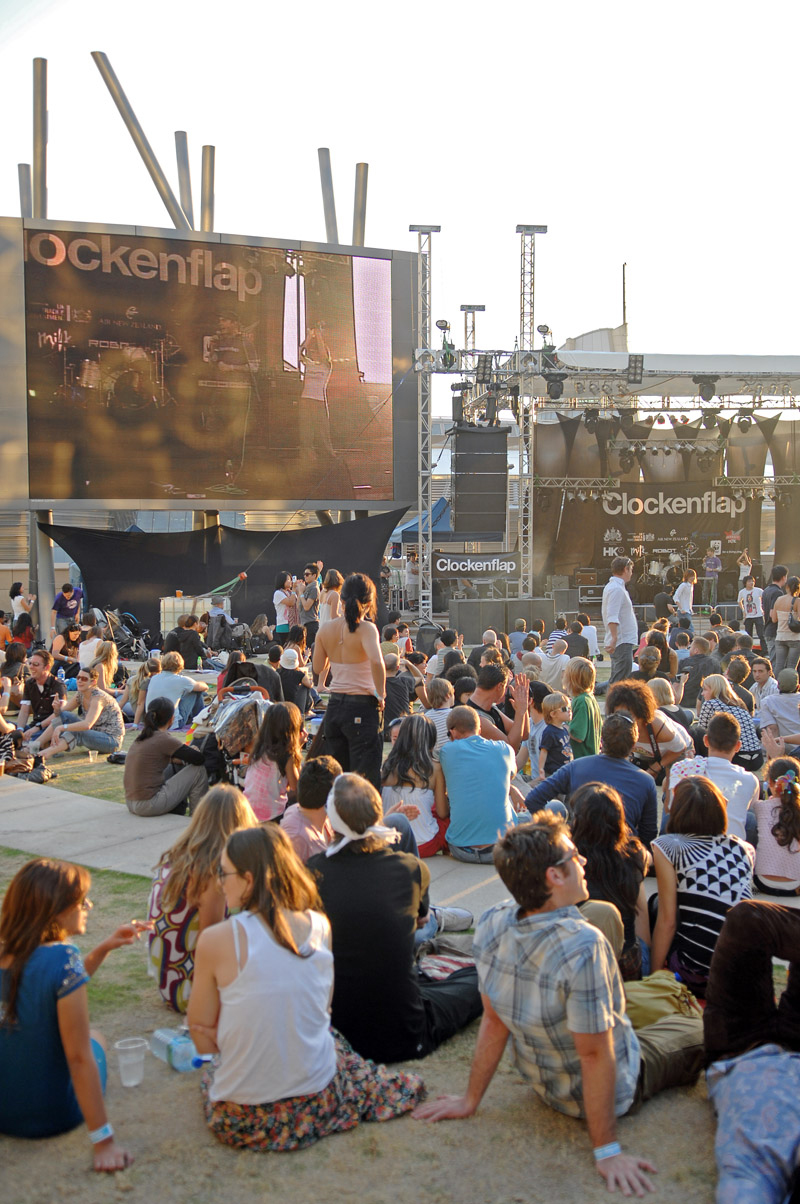
Clockenflap in 2008

The first Clockenflap festival was held on Saturday 12 January 2008 at Cyberport. Some 1,500 people attended.
