= West Kowloon Bamboo Theatre =

Temporary opera venue in Hong Kong

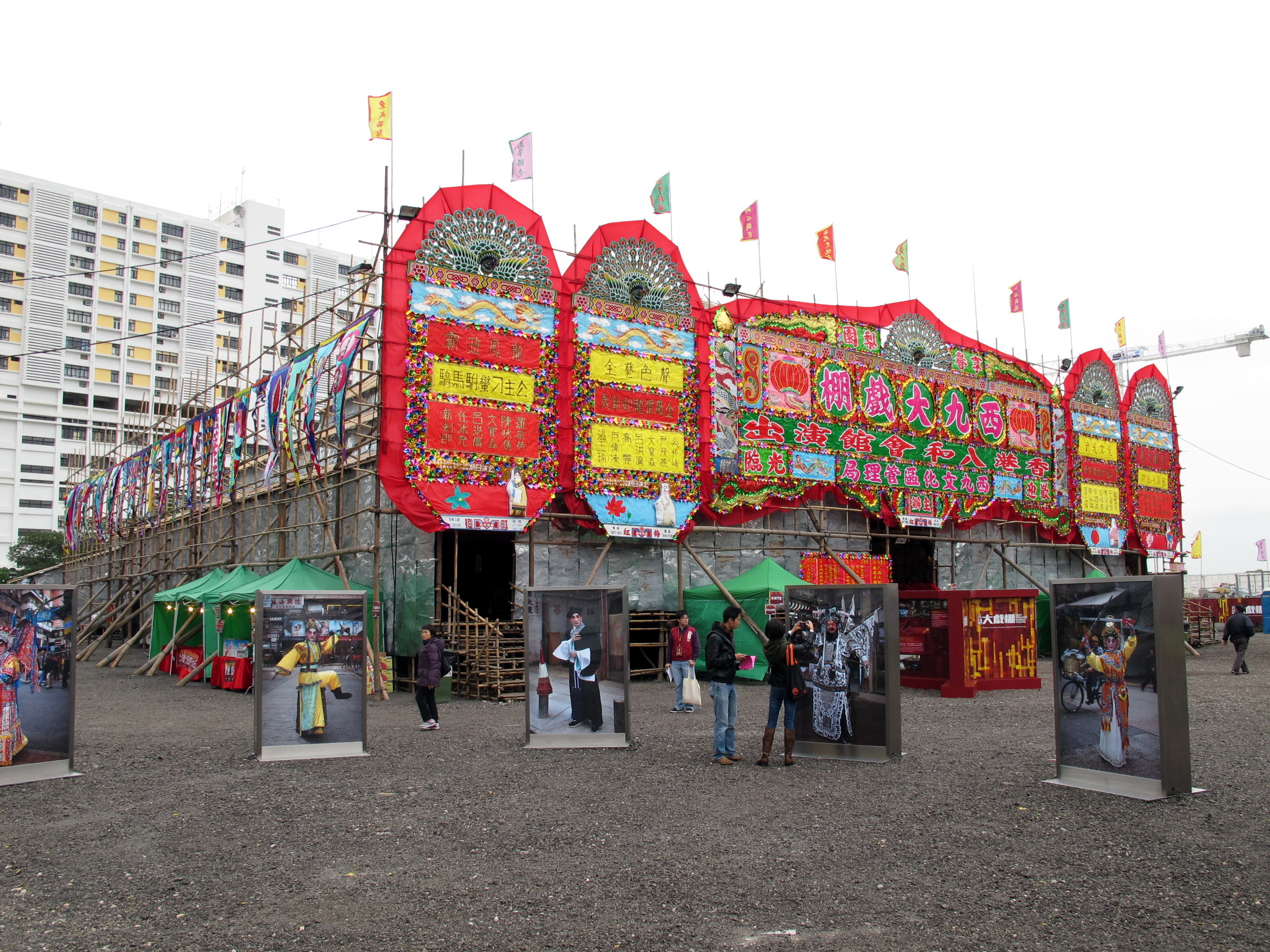
The West Kowloon Bamboo Theatre, emblazoned with flower plaques, in 2012

West Kowloon Bamboo Theatre is one of the flagship programmes of the West Kowloon Cultural District Authority (WKCDA). The West Kowloon Bamboo Theatre has been held since 2012 by the WKCDA which aims to promote Cantonese opera and the West Kowloon Cultural District (WKCD). Due to its popularity, the WKCDA continues to organise the West Kowloon Bamboo Theatre annually after 2012. Starting from 2013, apart from Cantonese opera, the theatre also provides performances of modern music and Chinese dance. There was a New Year Fair being provided as well.

== Location ==
Since 2012, a temporary bamboo theatre, covering 1,800 square metres, has been set up by the WKCDA during the Chinese New Year for the performances. It is located next to the Tsim Sha Tsui Fire Station, at the junction of Canton Road and Austin Road, which is the future site of the Xiqu Centre. In 2014, the performing stage has moved to the West Kowloon Waterfront Promenade in the WKCD.

== History ==
=== 2012 ===
The West Kowloon Bamboo Theatre is the first cultural event organized by the West Kowloon Cultural District Authority to celebrate the Chinese New Year with theatrical inspiration. The cost of land levelling and bamboo scaffolding is about HK$1,000,000. The Bamboo Theatre was constructed traditionally using over 10000 bamboo stalks by 10 bamboo scaffolders within 2 weeks to provide 800-seat auditorium. In addition, it is the largest bamboo theatre built in Hong Kong.

The Cantonese opera actors from The Chinese Artists Association of Hong Kong performed a total of 11 Cantonese operas from 20 January 2012 to 23 January 2012, including “Prime Minister of Six States” and “The Sassy Princess and Her Blunt Husband”. The Authority decided to put on two extra performance since the tickets of 6 original performance sold out within half an hour. In order to attract local people, each ticket cost relatively low (HK$10). It is estimated that the Authority had to pay for about one million as allowance.

An exhibition of newly commissioned works by five contemporary artists, including Chu Hing-wah, Gaylord Chan, Michael Wolf, Samson Young and Henry Chu, is held in M+ (the future Museum of Visual Arts). Five rarely-seen opera-themed film classics, including John Woo's Princess Chang Ping (1976) and Ann Hui's Spooky Bunch (1980), also be shown in back-to-back outdoor screenings with English subtitles.

=== 2013 ===
The West Kowloon Bamboo Theatre 2013, themed "City Memories" was held between January 30 and February 16, 2013, at the West Kowloon Cultural District, attracting a hundred thousand visitors. The 2013 Bamboo Theatre was covered by a golden orange nylon net so as to make the venue look like an ancient palace-like architecture, holding various performances, a fair and an exhibition during the 3-week period. A crossover of tradition and innovative Augmented Reality (AR) technology was also introduced in 2013's West Kowloon Bamboo Theatre. Visitors only needed to pay for some of the performances this year while the other activities are free of charge.

Performances at the Bamboo Theatre included 14 Cantonese operas (of which four had free admission), one Chinese dance performance (free admission as well) and 2 contemporary music concerts. The Cantonese opera performances were provided by different local opera troupes including Golden Glory Cantonese Opera Troupe (with Law Ka-Ying as one of the cast), Lung Fei Cantonese Opera Troupe (with Tse Suet-sum as one of the cast), Sun Moon Star Cantonese Opera Troupe, Golden Dragon Cantonese Opera Troupe, Sum Mei Cantonese Opera Troupe, Hong Kong Young Talent Opera Troupe and The Young Academy Cantonese Opera Troupe. 2 music performances, namely "A Cappella Platter" and "Flower Music" were performed by A Cappella Zhong Yue Feng and SIU2 respectively. Finally, the dance performance was by Hong Kong Dance Company.

The newly introduced AR technology allowed visitors to interact with the venue. For the exhibition, the designs of the future Xiqu Centre was displayed. With the AR Xiqu Centre App, visitors could scan the AR code of the winning design of the Xiqu Centre Design Competition and watch an animation of the design. Apart from the exhibition, the world's first AR Code Floral Panels were available at the Bamboo Theatre too. Scanning it with their smartphones or tablets, visitors could have a look of the AR blueprint of the Xiqu Centre on their devices.

=== 2014 ===
The 2014 West Kowloon Bamboo Theatre was held during 17 January to 9 February. The location was changed to West Kowloon Waterfront Promenade due to the construction of Xiqu Centre. The venue of 2014 West Kowloon Bamboo Theatre was 4 times bigger than that in 2012 and 2013. Different kinds of Chinese operas such as kunqu and jingkunqu were performed on a free-of-charge basis. Experienced and amateur artists were invited to participate in the performance. Classical Chinese movies, which were mainly about Chinese opera songs, were shown in the theatre. Talks and educational activities concerning the development of Chinese opera were also included in the 2014 West Kowloon Bamboo Theatre.

== Tickets ==
In 2012, the ticket price for Cantonese opera of the West Kowloon Bamboo Theatre was HK$10 while it was free for M+ Bamboo Theatre Exhibition and M+ Bamboo Cinema. Later in 2013, the ticket price has increased by at least 10 times to HK$150. in 2014, the ticket price has increased by HK$200 to HK$280.
