= Freespace Fest =

Festival in Hong Kong

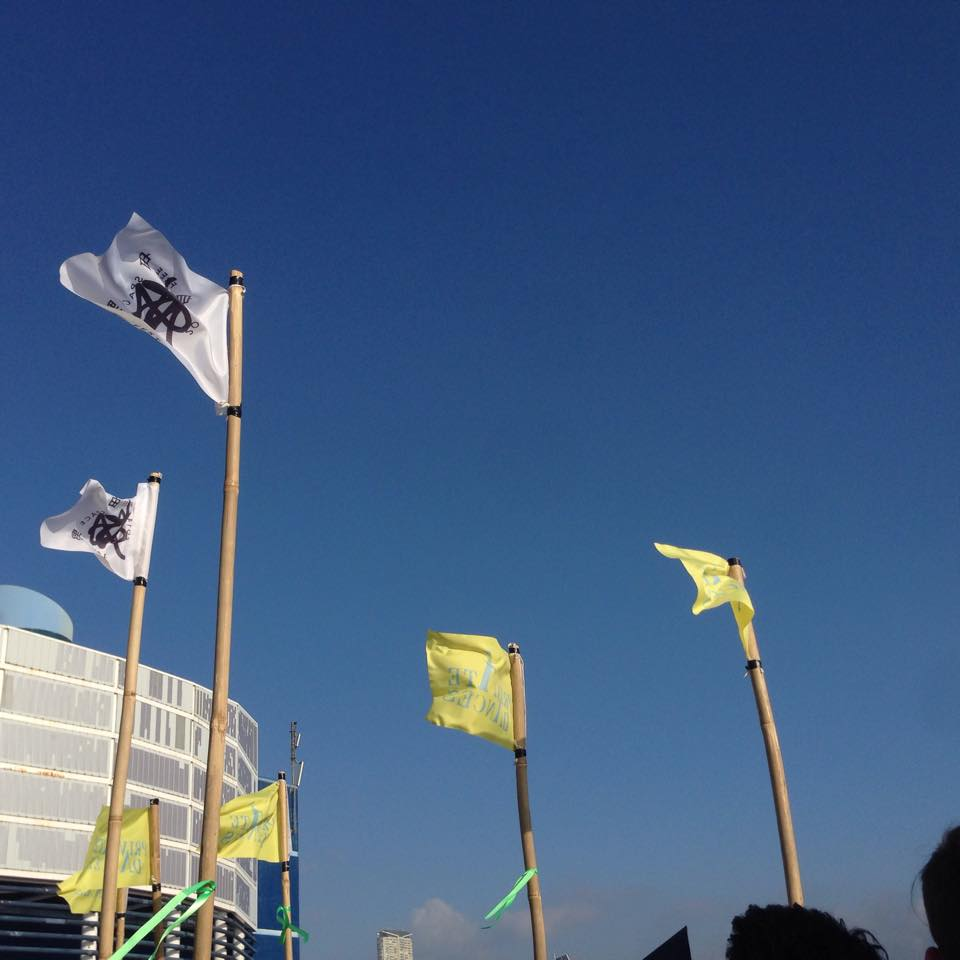
- Freespace Fest flags
- Years active: 2012–present
- Genres: Arts and culture festival
- Age range: All age groups

Freespace Fest is an outdoor arts festival held in West Kowloon Waterfront Promenade, Hong Kong. It is a two-day event held annually starting from 2012, held before the Clockenflap Music and Arts Festival in the same area. It features a number of activities such as an open market and dancing performances. Participants are also encouraged to have picnics. There is normally no charge for admission, although a special event in 2014 named 'M.U.R.S.' which charged for admission.

== Purposes ==
Freespace Fest is an outdoor arts festival which has been held in Hong Kong since 2012. It aims at exchanging different culture and promoting creative arts.

Hong Kong is an International Finance Centre and a profits-oriented city, people are seldom aware of the importance of arts and culture. Freespace Fest provides a platform where artists can display their talent while audiences appreciate them and do their own activities in the spaces offered. It also covers various kinds of unique cultural elements such as music, dancing, parkour and handicraft booths to display diverse Hong Kong culture. Freespace Fest acts as a main event to arouse people's interest in participating other Arts events and concern local cultures. It also provides an opportunity to Hong Kong people to relax and enjoy the amusement of cultures and arts. Moreover, it can strongly coheres the boundaries of Hong Kongers through sharing and preserving unique culture.

== History ==
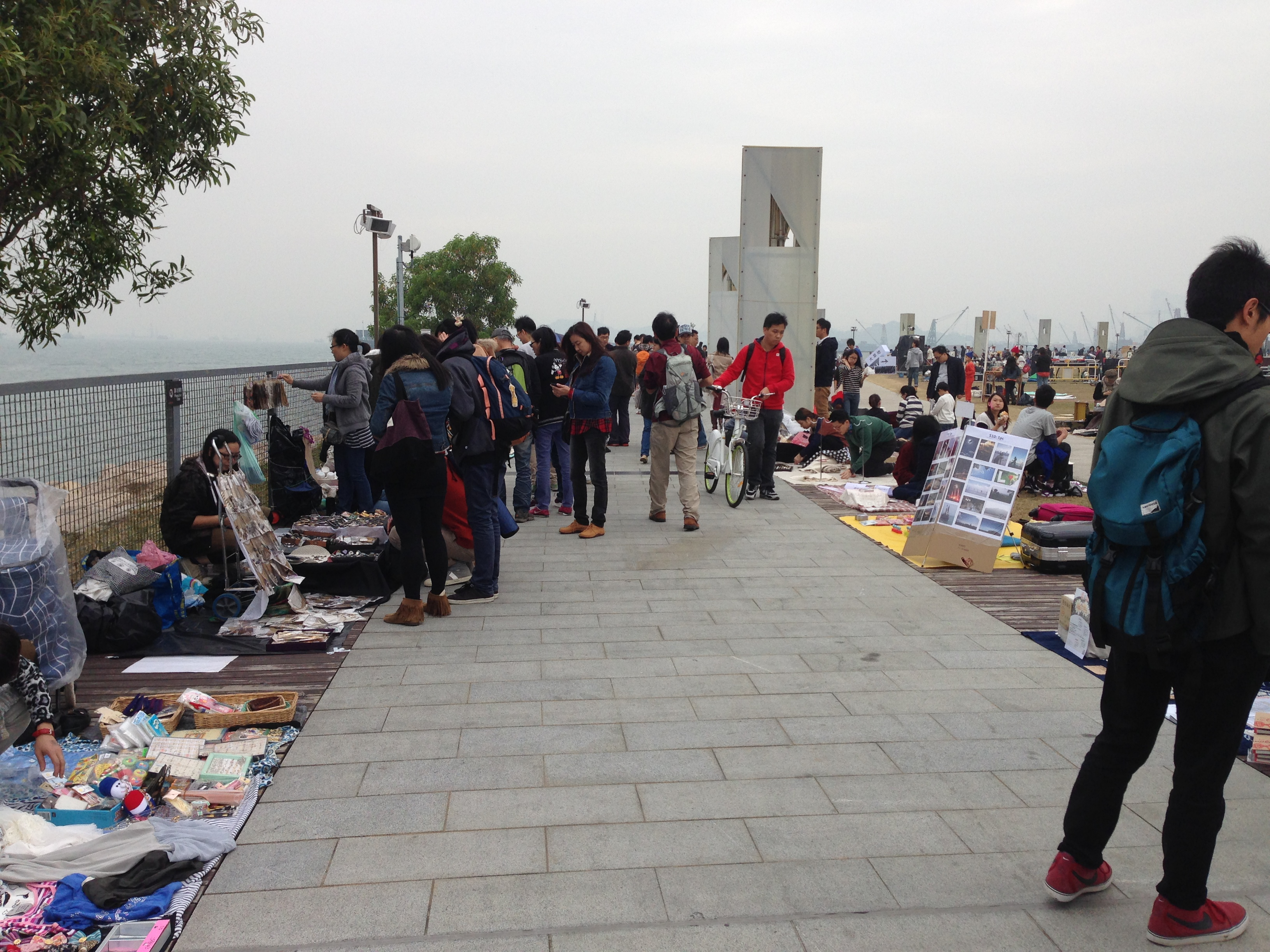
Hanicraft market alone the promenade

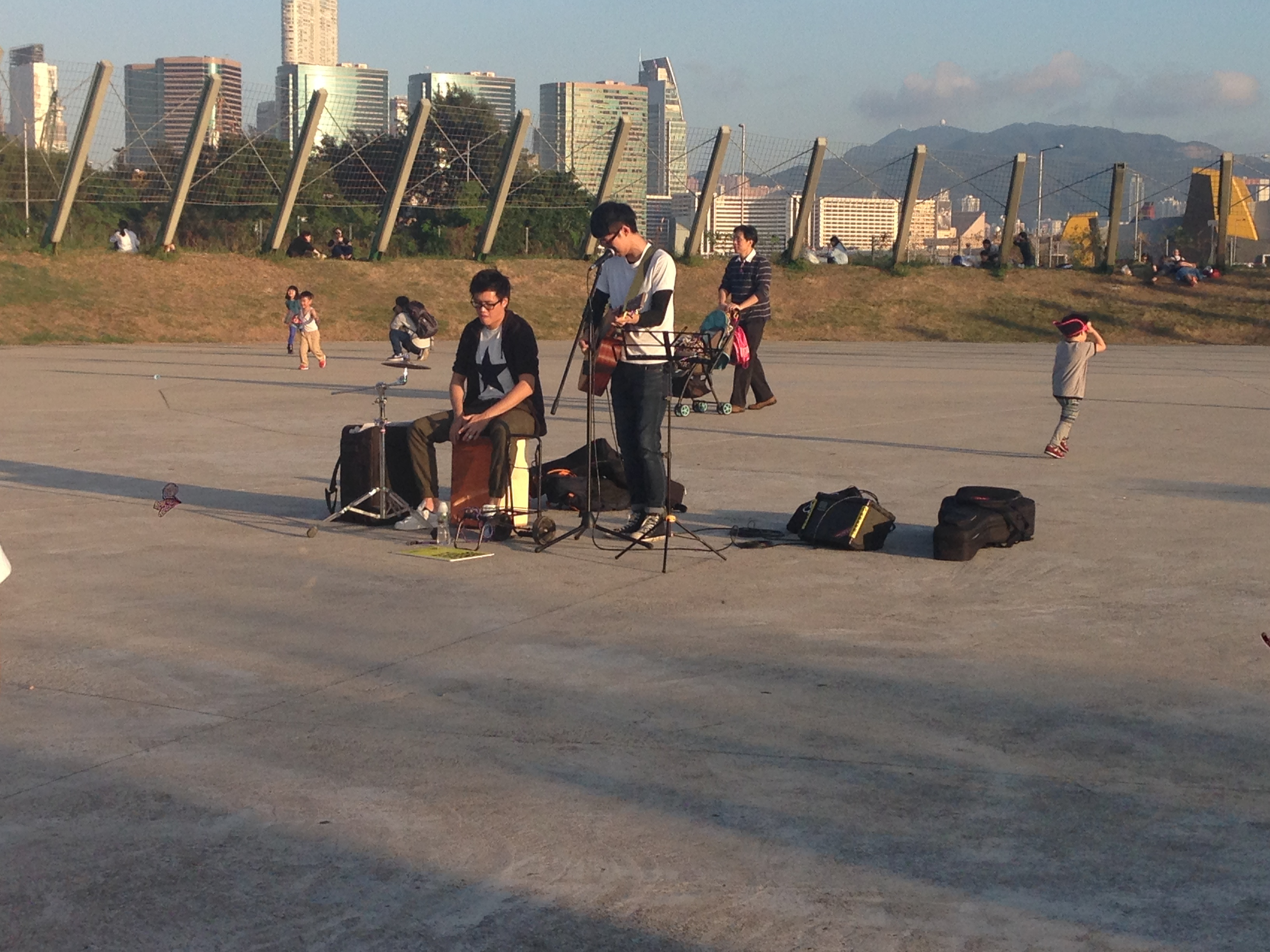
Music performance in Freespace Fest 2014

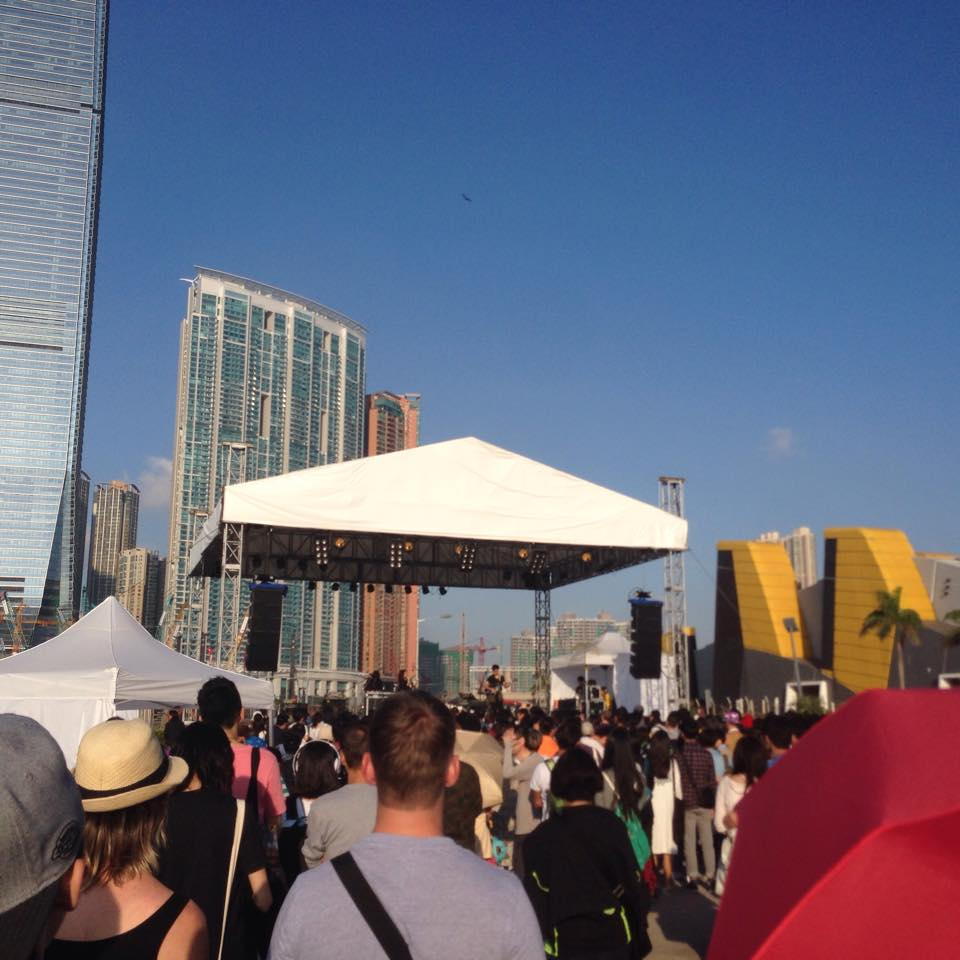
Music stage for Freespace Fest

The festival began in 2012 as a two-day festival held annually until the West Kowloon project is fully established. It is usually held in late November and December. In the latest festival which was held in 2014, there were more than 43000 entries.

Year	Date
2012	15–16 December
2013	14–15 December
2014	22–23 November

== Admission fee ==
Freespace Fest was a free event for the first two years, however, starting from the third year, the organizers planned to charge HKD 50 for entrance. The response from the public was extremely negative as many believed that the festival should be a ‘free’ festival for the public to enjoy with family and friends. To express their dissatisfaction towards this, there were Facebook Pages set up, such as "Hacking Freespace Fest: 9 play!” which protested against the admission fee. Finally, the West Kowloon Cultural District Authority decided to go back to free admission.

== Activities ==
Activities held during the festivals are similar every year. Their purpose is to promote local arts and culture while allowing participants to relax.

Handicraft market:

People are allowed to sell handmade products in which they can share their creativity and innovations to others. Areas are not restricted. There are also no regulations for stall owners so as to promote freedom.

Literature sharing:

Reading club on the grass, Cantonese poetry readings, collaborations of music and poetry are the main events for the exchange of knowledge. It aims at inspiring and sharing ideas on topics with people who share the same interests.

Farmers' market:

Local farmers are given an area to sell locally produced crops. Organic and healthy products are also provided for purchase. Typically, farmers share their ideas on organic and local farming. This allows citizens who live in urban areas to get a better understanding of farming in our city.

Music performances:

The organization of the festival invites artists and musicians to perform and collaborate on the stage built for the festival. In 2014, some artists such as Supper Moment, DJ rupture, Mike Orange and so on were invited to the festival. It offers a chance for people to create and exchange ideas.

Dance events:

OPENUU collaborated with the Hong Kong Parkour Association to design and install a temporary park tailored to parkour and dance activities, for the 2013 Freespace Fest held at the West Kowloon Cultural District.

== Special event ==
“M.U.R.S.”:

In Freespace Fest 2014, an interactive outdoor show “M.U.R.S.” by La Fura Dels Baus from Spain was added to the festival by the organiser. MURS means “wall” in French. It is like a giant- walled city that is divided into four areas: Fortune, Green-living, Well-being and Security. The show requires the audience to use their electrical devices to receive instructions during the show time in order to interact with performers and help complete the show. Tickets are $150 per person or $100 for full-time students or elderly over the age of 65.

‘Grasscamp’ at Freespace:

In Free Space Fest 2014, participants of the event were invited to camp in the West Kowloon Promenade area. This offered a great chance for stressed citizens who were leading hectic lives. For the campers who stayed there overnight, 24-hour music programs were provided for them so as to experience another kind of camping.

== Future ==
The future of Freespace festival is still uncertain and not intentionally developed by the Hong Kong government as the government set many restrictions to groups and associations who book the area for public recreation.

However, the government can consider holding the festival in other open areas, such as Lantau Island and small islands near Hong Kong Island which acquires large public space. As the government is actively arousing the importance of arts to the citizens, this event has a foreseeable future in Hong Kong.
