= AIA Carnival =

Annual event in Hong Kong

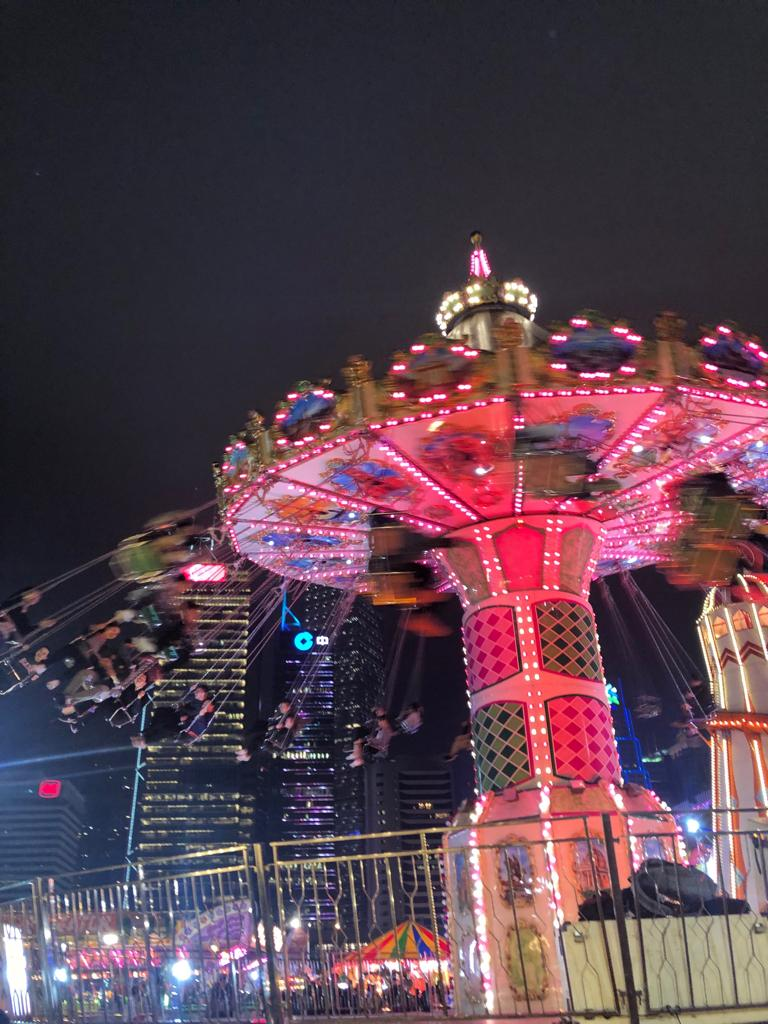
Wave Swinger

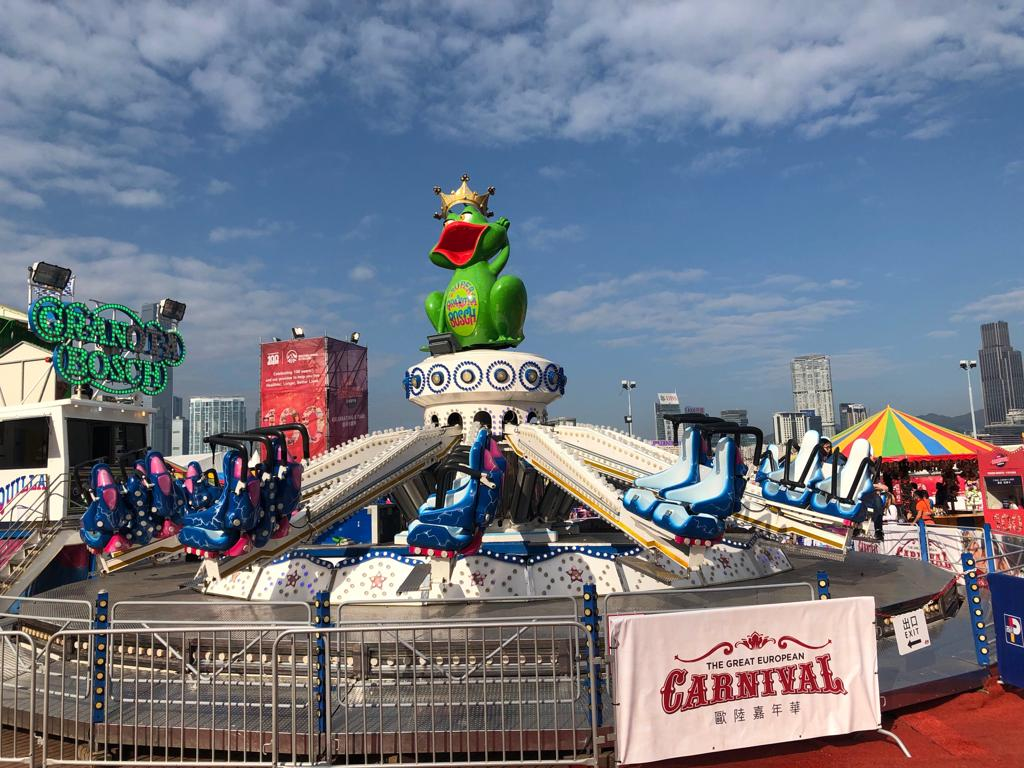
Jumping Frog Ride

The AIA Carnival, formerly the AIA Great European Carnival is an annual event which takes place at the Central Harbourfront, Hong Kong. The Carnival is usually held in winter and spans the major holidays. It provides a number of amusement rides, attractions and skill games. In 2017, a “Big Top” style tent was introduced to the Carnival to showcase live performances act such as the Great Circus of Europe and the Billboard Radio Live Stage.

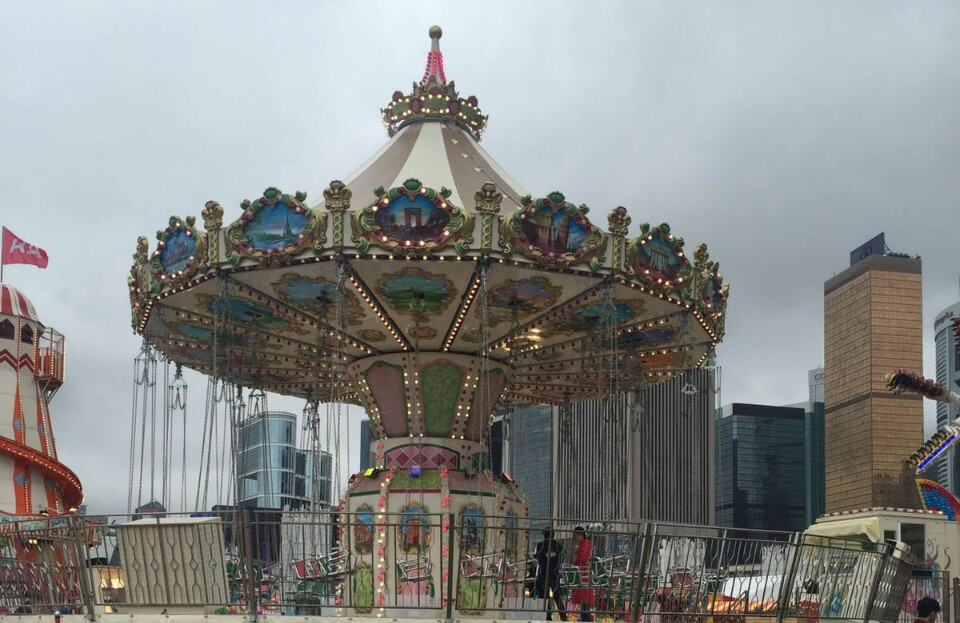

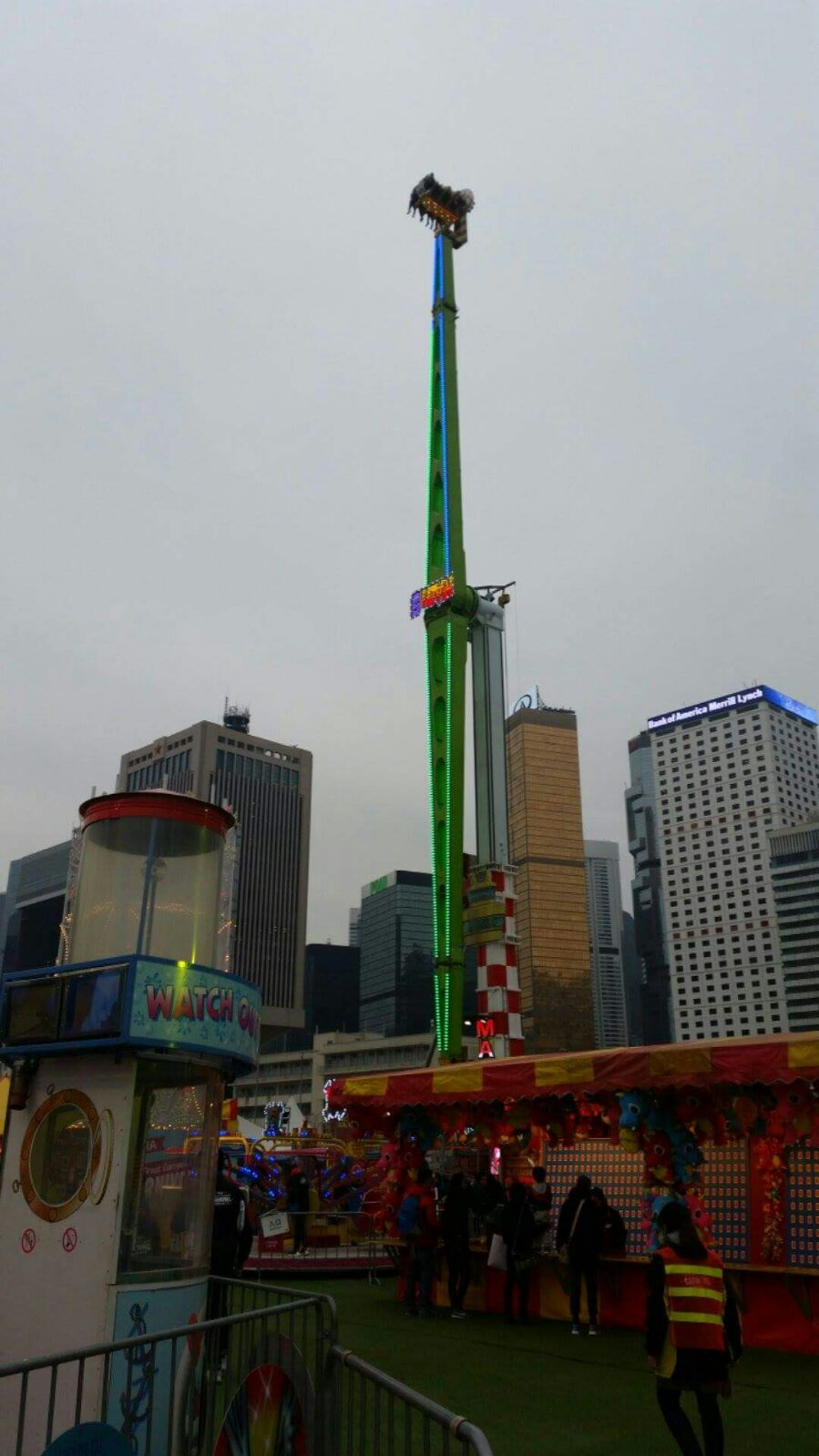

The Carnival attracted 1 million visitors in 2015-2016. An external customer survey showed that over 80% of the visitors are highly satisfied with their experiences at the Carnival and shared their happy experience with their families and friends. They also indicated that they would revisit the Carnival in 2016-2017.

== History ==
The AIA Carnival is organized by The Great European Carnival Limited, a company founded by media and entertainment moghul Michael Denmark. His stated goals for the event is to provide Hong Kong with a carnival style event that Hongkongers could call their own. AIA Group Limited has been the Title Sponsor for the Carnival for 5 years straight since its inception.

=== The AIA Great European Carnival 2014/2015 ===
The carnival was held from 23 December 2014- 22 February 2015. 59 trailers of carnival equipment were shipped from Europe, while employing 800 people from 16 countries, including 500 Hongkongers.

=== The AIA Great European Carnival 2015/2016 ===
The Carnival was held from 17 December 2015- 21 February 2016 and employed over 1,000 Hongkongers. An additional 11 new rides were introduced to the Carnival including the Booster Maxx. Other new additions included the Underbelly Festival and the historic Luminarie light installations.

This iteration of the Carnival won several awards including Marketing Magazine's Best Event Consumer, Best Sponsorship Activation, Gold in Excellence in Event Marketing, Gold in Excellence in Best Partnership Awards in 2015 and Golden Globe for Best use of Social Media in Marketing at the Golden Globe Tiger Awards for Regional Marketing Excellence (Asia) in 2016.

=== The AIA Great European Carnival 2016/2017 ===
Beginning on 16 December 2016 to 12 February 2017, the third installation of the carnival introduced the Billboard Radio Live stage which featured Hong Kong singers like Jason Chan, Lil’Ashes, Jonathan Wong, Kandy and JW.

=== The AIA Great European Carnival 2017/2018 ===
Starting from 21 December 2017 to 25 February 2018, the fourth Carnival ran for 67 days. New additions to the Carnival included the Great Circus of Europe which is an animal-cruelty-free show featuring acts like the Gerlings High Wire, Motorcycles in the Globe and the Space Wheel.

=== The AIA Carnival 2018/2019 ===
The fifth Carnival ran for 66 days, starting from 14 December 2018 to 17 February 2019, with an refresh logo and look & feel. For the first time, the Carnival's name was officially changed to the AIA Carnival. A futuristic theme (neon lights & outer space themed decorations) was introduced to blend with the elements of the traditional carnival (traditional carnival rides and games). Celebrity Chef Christian Yang was also engaged to work with food vendors to develop unique treats to be sold at the carnival including a satay noodle taco and pineapple bun egg waffle. Returning to the Carnival for the second time was the Great Circus of Europe with all new classic circus acts such as the double space wheel, aerial cradle, cloud swing, strong man and rubber man.

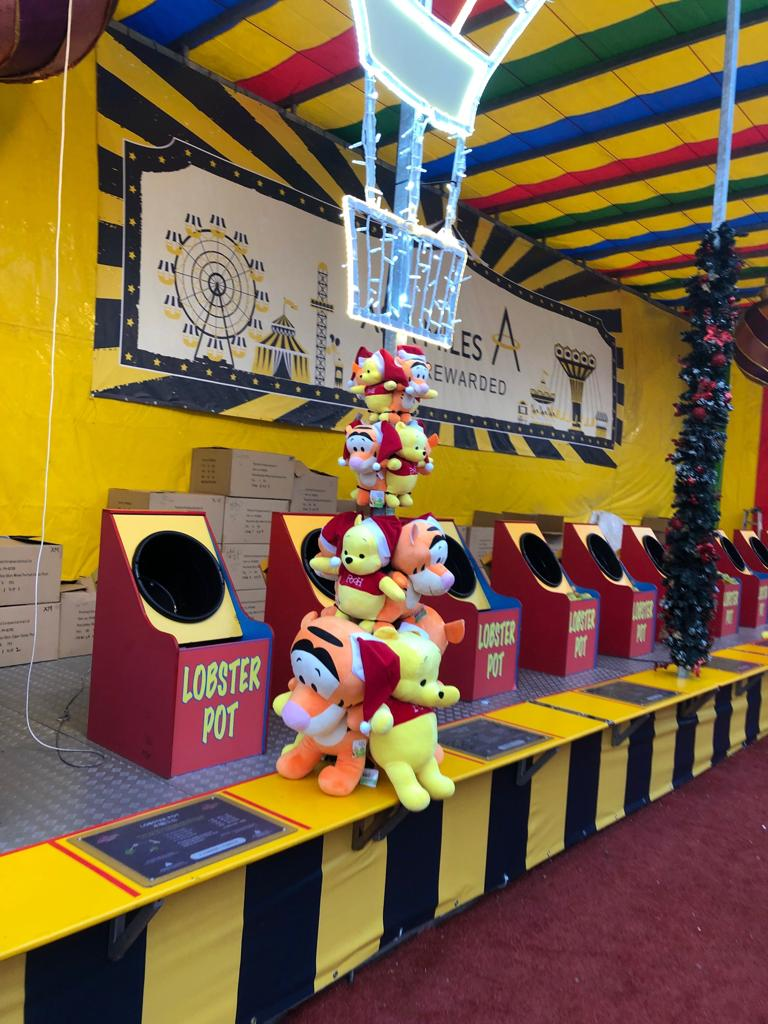
Lobster Pot Game

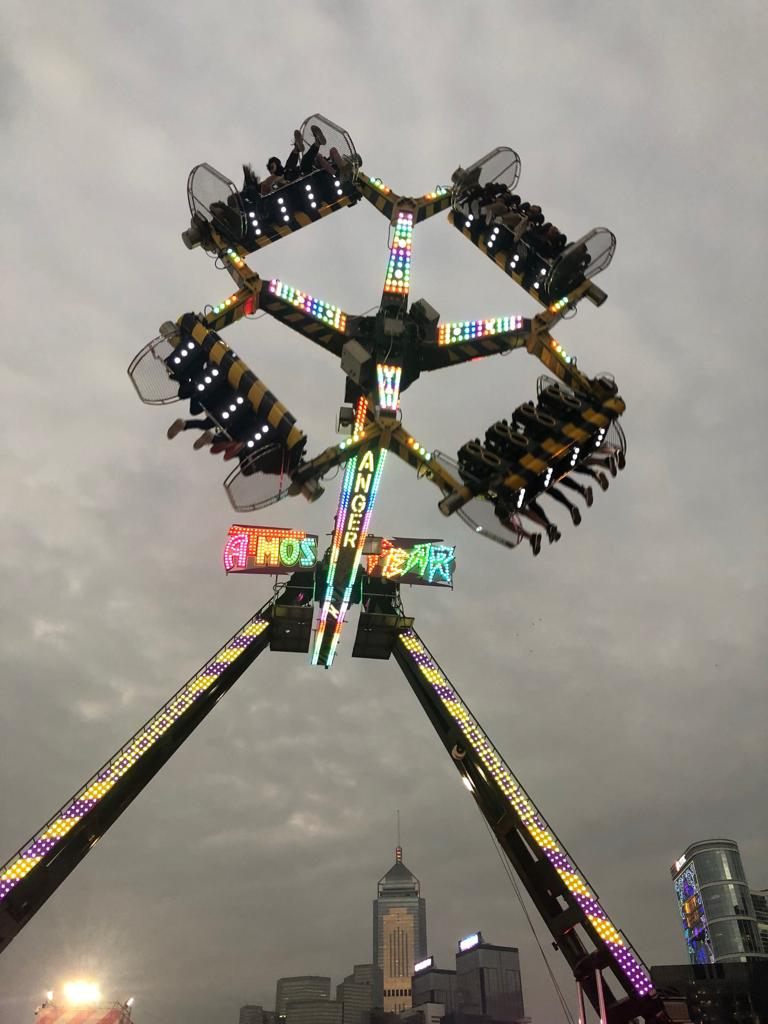
Atmos Fear

== Amusement rides and skill games ==
=== Amusement rides ===
The carnival offers over 30 rides for a variety levels of excitement. There are thrill rides such as Sky Flyer, the Mach 5, the Xtreme, the Remix, the Log Flume, etc. There are also some rides suitable for families and children such as the Apple Coaster, the Rockin’ Tug, the Pony Adventure and the Chair O Plane. Some traditional rides such as the Carousel are also offered in the carnival.

=== Skill games ===
In addition to the rides, the carnival also provides patrons chances to win soft toys in their game stalls, which are suitable for all ages. They are namely, "Pop Guns", "Hook a Duck", "Roll a Ball", "Hoop the Block", "Spots", "On the Plate", "Milk Churns", "Stick a Card", "Basketball Extreme”, "Lobster Pot", "Big Mouth", "Bowling", "Can Blaster", 'Can Smash", "Catch A Fish", 'Circle Darts", "Fried Frogs", "Goblets", and "Hot Shots".

Other features of the carnival include selfies booths, live entertainment, kids play zone and sumptuous gourmet.

== Safety controversies ==
Several safety incidents occurred during the AIA Great European Carnival in Hong Kong. On January 22, government inspectors found defects in a component of the Inversion XXL ride. The ride was thus shut down and the operator was required to implement measures to fix the problem. Another incident occurred on February 9, in which eight passengers were trapped on the No Limit ride for 30 minutes. It was due to a power failure that triggered the safety systems. Thus, the ride was stopped and the passengers were unable to get out of their seats. The maintenance staff manually released them in 20 minutes and all the 8 people were safe. The ride was then halted and the Electrical and Mechanical Services Department had asked for rectification before it can be reopened.

== See also ==
- Carnival
