= Flower plaque =

Type of floral art from South China

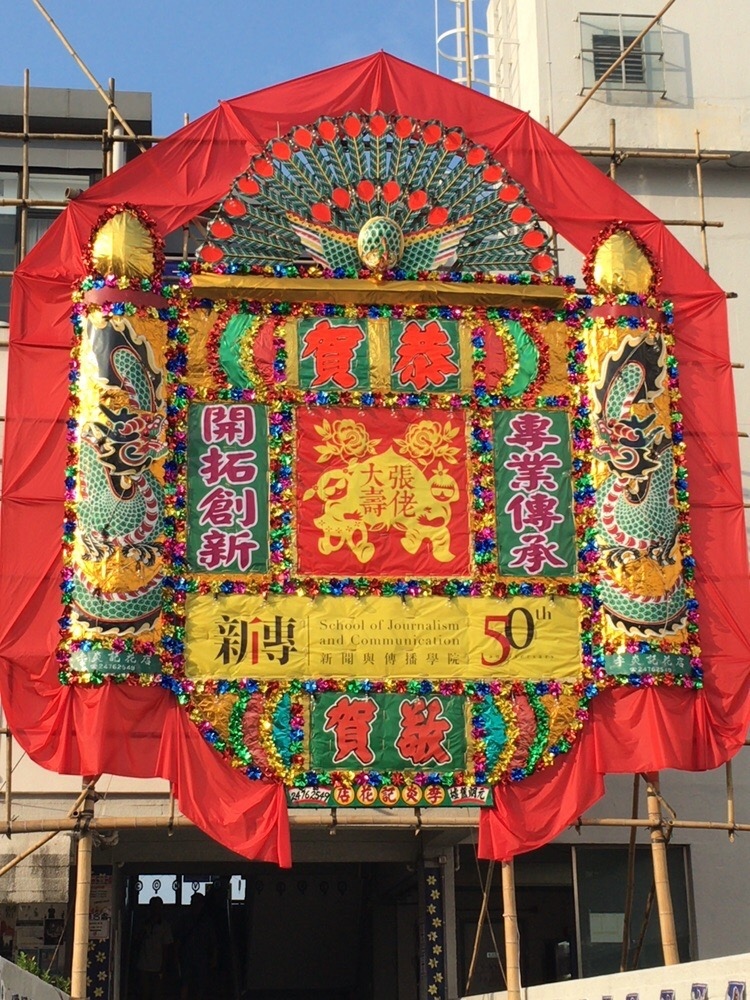
The Chinese flower plaque in the Chinese University of Hong Kong(CUHK).

The flower plaque (Chinese: 花牌; Jyutping: faa1 paai4), also known as flower board, is a traditional craft in China, especially in Hong Kong. It is a gigantic bamboo banner approximately 110-feet (40m) wide and 34-foot (10m) high. They are built to celebrate traditional Chinese festivals, weddings and inaugurations. The plaques symbolise luck, happiness and prosperity. The materials used are mainly bamboos, wires, paper, fabric and plastics with red and bright colour. It is usually built to be a theatre or the entrance. We can find Chinese flower plaques in New Territories such as Tin Hau Temple and Yuen Long.

== History ==
There are different sayings for the origin of Chinese flower plaques. It is believed that Chinese flower plaques are extended from Paifang (牌坊). Chinese plagues are also deemed as pseudo-Chinese Palace’s accessories for bringing fortune.

In the past of Hong Kong, Chinese flower plaques had various kind of usage. They were mainly used for Chinese traditional festivals such as Chinese Lunar New Year and Tin Hau Festival. They were also used for advertisement, decoration for shop openings or even weddings.

In the 60s-80s, Chinese flower plaques were the most vibrant and prosperous industry in Hong Kong. Whenever there was opening of new shops especially Chinese restaurant and salon, there were many colourful flower plaques with Chinese blessings: ke si yun lai (客似雲來) or sheng yi xing long (生意興隆) written with Chinese calligraphy.

In the 1960s, Hong Kong craftsman discovered a new type of Chinese flower plaques which was a mechanical box. They were mainly made of motors, belts, gongs (鑼) and paper-mache dolls. The mechanical flower plaques performed a short play based on Chinese folklore and historical stories. They were put outside the bakery to attract customers.

In 1975, Elizabeth II the queen visited Oi Man Estate(愛民邨). The first English version of flower plaques were placed and written “Welcome Queen and Prince” for welcoming. In 2014, Chinese flower plaques were brought into the first list of the Hong Kong's intangible cultural heritage.

== Characteristics ==
=== Appearance ===
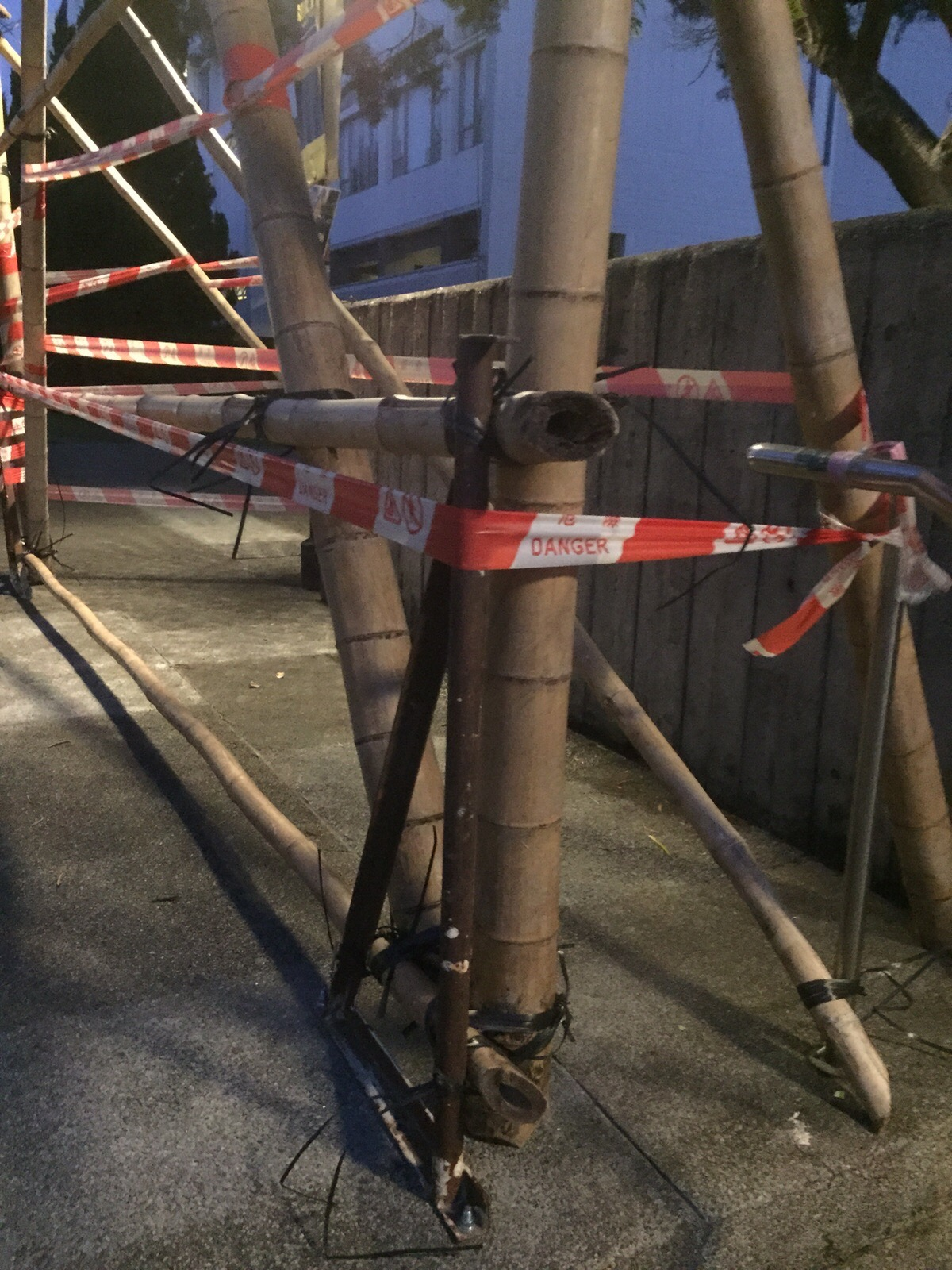
Bamboos used in the Chinese Flower Plaque.

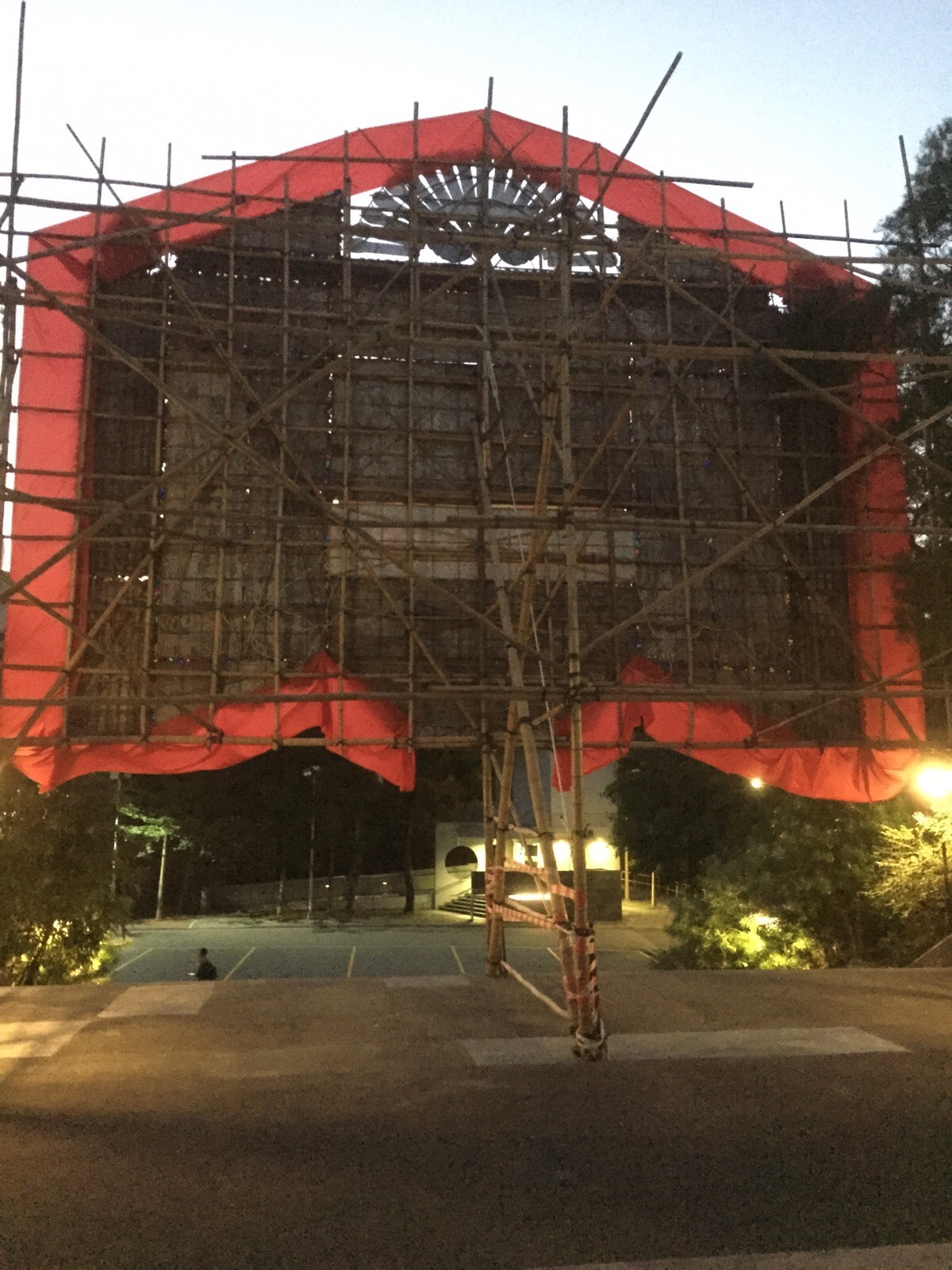
The back of the Chinese Flower Plaque.

The height and width of Chinese flower plaques depends on the space of site. It ranges from 10 metres tall and 40 metres wide. They are made of highly reusable and easily assembled materials such as bamboo, tins, wire meshes, colourful papers, fabrics and plastics. They are usually in red tone, since red represents luck. There are neatly handwritten words on the plaques. However, printed words replaced handwritten words for reducing cost and time in nowadays. Flower plaques have a parallel, symmetrical and geometric pattern in red to draw attention of passers-by. Some of them have light bulbs to glow at night.

=== Method of production ===
Making a huge Chinese flower plaques usually takes 15–20 days. The duration of making it depends on its complexity and size. It includes Chinese calligraphy, painting, paper artwork and sophisticated skills of putting all decorations on a bamboo frame. The first step of making it is to build a stable frame by using bamboos, wire meshes and metallic foils. Artists write Chinese congratulatory couplets in the middle of it. They also add propitious animals like dragons and phoenixes in a separate process. Decorative accessories on the flower plaque are made of colourful papers and foils. The most difficult part is making the dragon and phoenixes vividly with metal wires.

=== Location ===
The Chinese flower plaques are mostly located in Hong Kong's rural villages in the New Territories as there are more open areas and less high density buildings. People can rarely find flower plaques in Kowloon and Hong Kong Island, as it is impossible to build flower plaques in shopping malls.

== Hong Kong Culture ==
Flower plaques are used in Hong Kong in two festivals, with different purposes.

=== Hungry Ghost Festival ===
The Hungry Ghost Festival is an event to thank gods. Villagers and their relatives have gatherings and rituals where they hope gods can protect them from ghosts. Chinese flower plaques are of utmost importance in these rituals. Names of relatives and organizations are written on it as a traditional custom.

=== Cheung Chau Bun Festival ===
Chinese Flower plaques are used in the Cheung Chau Bun Festival to thank gods for the peace of nation.

The main difference from the Hungry Ghosts Festival is that the object of prayer in the Bun Festival is good weather as Cheung Chau residents, in the past, fished for a living.

=== Cheung Chau styled Chinese flower plaque ===
Chinese flower plaques are used for notification in Cheung Chau. For example, residents in Cheung Chau use flower plaques to inform others on travelling and weddings instead of decoration and promotion.

The flower plaques in Cheung Chau are made of papers in fluorescent color; they are different from the normal one which use red papers.

== Flower plaque store in HK ==
The development of flower plaques is declining because of insufficient laborers and urban development. There are only a few sustainable flower plaque businesses: Wing Kei Flower Store and Lee Yim Kee Flower Shop.

== See also ==
- Chinese paper cutting
- Chinese paper folding
- Chinese Calligraphy
