= Central Harbourfront =

Waterfront site in Hong Kong

- Waterfront
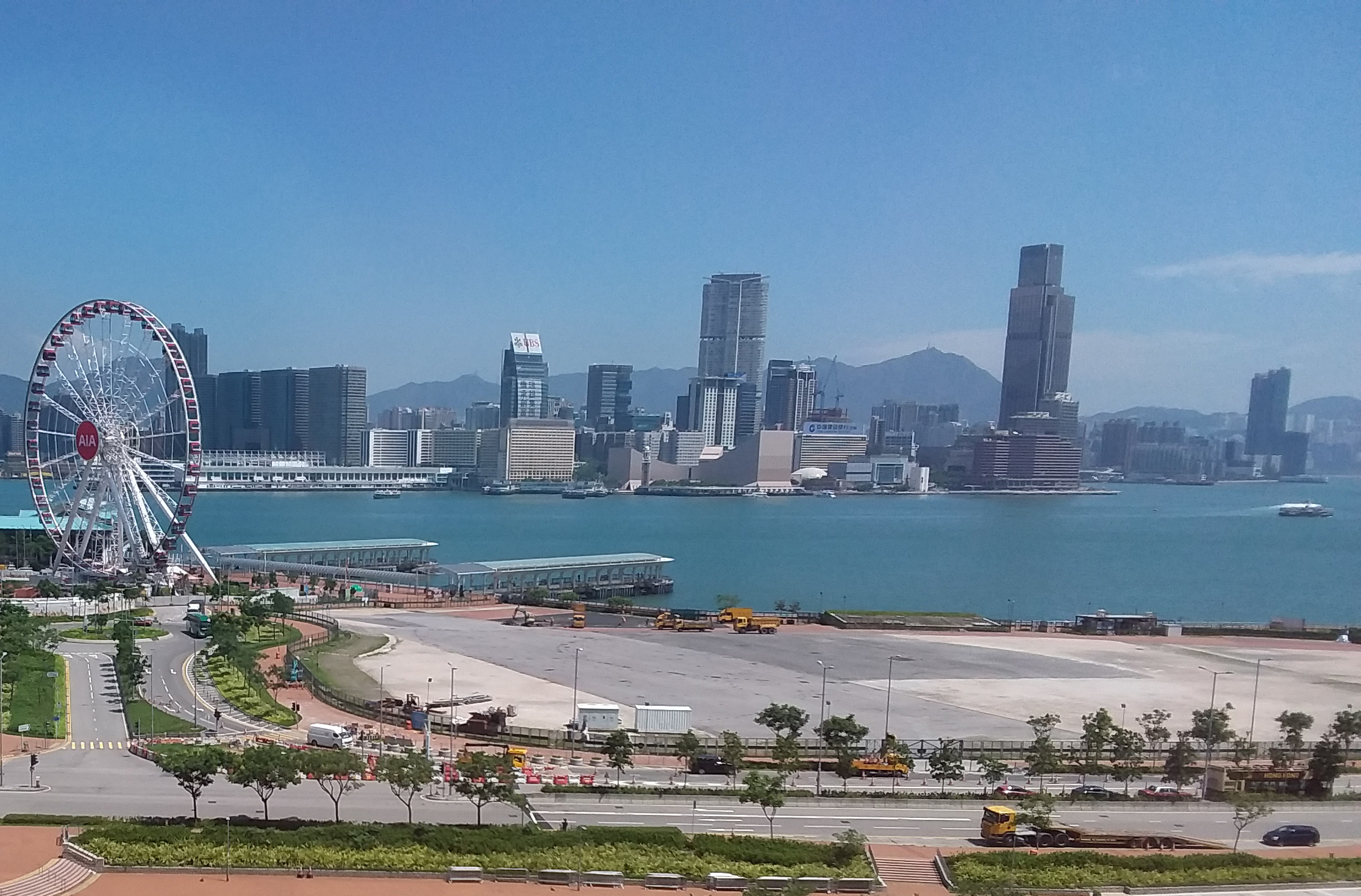
- A partial view of the Central Harbourfront area, with the HKOW located on the left and a limited sight of the Kowloon skyline behind.

- Location within Hong Kong
- Coordinates: 22°17′0.76″N 114°9′46.13″E
- Country: China
- Special administrative region: Hong Kong
- District: Central
- Time zone: UTC+8:00 (HKT)

The Central Harbourfront is a waterfront site in Central, Hong Kong. It is the result of the Central and Wan Chai Reclamation, and it sits to the east of the International Finance Centre skyscraper. The harbourfront event space is the site of the Hong Kong Observation Wheel, and has hosted the AIA Vitality Park and Hong Kong ePrix of Formula E. The harbourfront offers a view of Tsim Sha Tsui and Kowloon across Victoria Harbour. At 8pm every night, visitors can enjoy the Symphony of Lights show from the Harbourfront.

The AIA Carnival is held there annually.
