= West Kowloon Waterfront Promenade =

Promenade in Kowloon, Hong Kong

Coordinates: 22.3013°N 114.1550°E

- Traditional Chinese: 西九龍海濱長廊
- Simplified Chinese: 西九龙海滨长廊
Transcriptions
Standard Mandarin
- Hanyu Pinyin: Xī Jiǔlóng Hǎibīn Chángláng
Yue: Cantonese
- Jyutping: sai1 gau2 lung4 hoi2 ban1 coeng4 long4

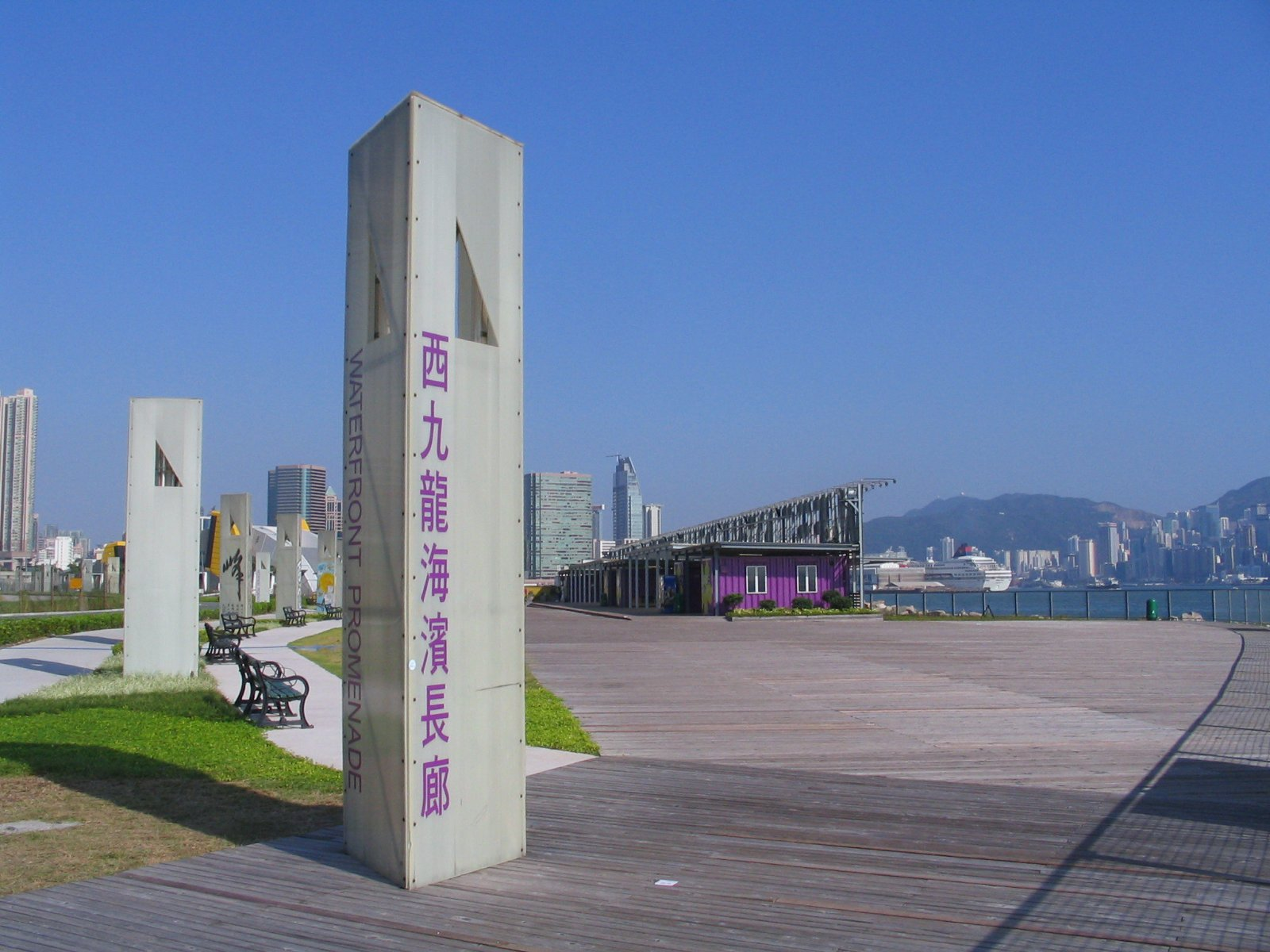
West Kowloon Waterfront Promenade

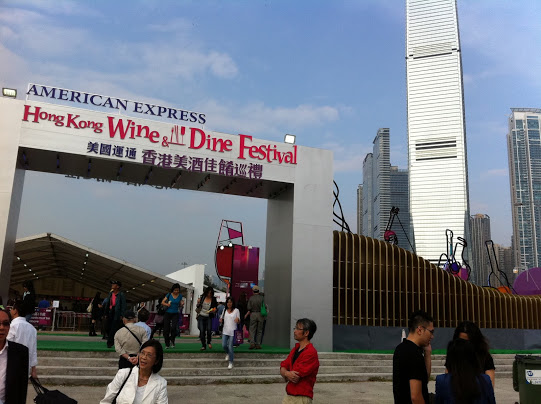
some events in Hong Kong

West Kowloon Waterfront Promenade (Chinese: 西九龍海濱長廊) is a promenade running alongside Victoria Harbour on reclaimed land in Tsim Sha Tsui on the Kowloon peninsula of Hong Kong. It opened to the public on 17 September 2005.

The promenade starts at the junction of Nga Cheung Road (雅翔道) and Austin Road West, outside the toll gate leading to the Western Harbour Crossing.

As the West Kowloon Cultural District project has remained stagnant after a long debate, the Hong Kong Government constructed a promenade on unused reclaimed land. The promenade is decorated with pillars of wind chimes and illuminated paintings as well as calligraphy in various styles.

== Specialties ==
=== Timber Boardwalk ===
The 700 metres (2,300 ft) section along the shore is covered with wooden strips made from construction waste.

=== Dragon of Lanterns ===
There are seventy 4-metre (13 ft) high triangular lighting towers on the 1-kilometre (0.62 mi) "Dragon of Lanterns". Wind chimes are hung at the top of the lighting towers.

== See also ==
- Freespace Fest
