= Eastern District, Hong Kong =

District in Hong Kong Island, Hong Kong

Eastern District 東區
- District
- Eastern District
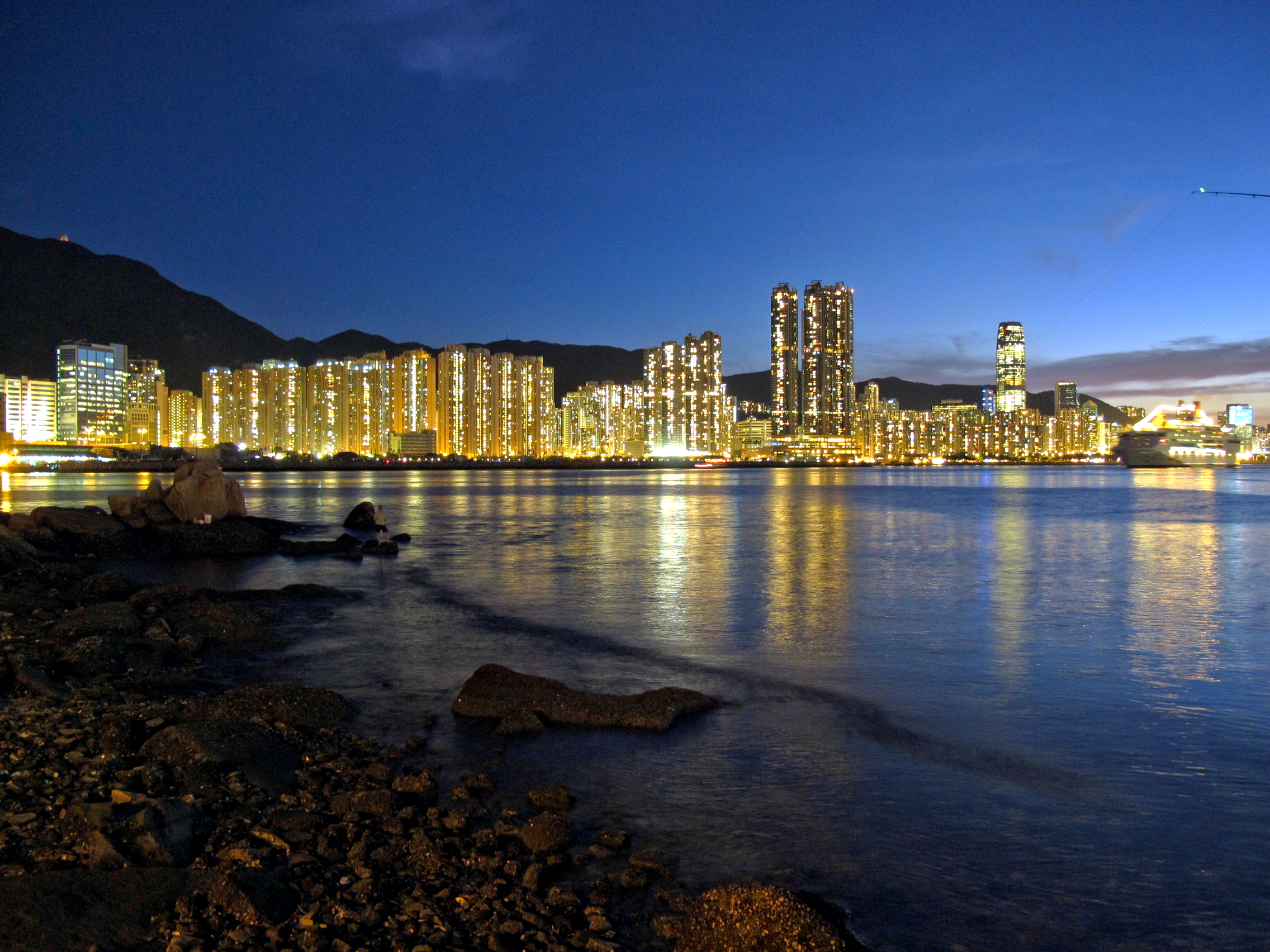
- Night view of the Eastern District skyline

- Official emblem

- Location of Eastern District within Hong Kong
- Interactive map of Eastern District
- Coordinates: 22°17′03″N 114°13′27″E
- Statutorily-defined area: Hong Kong
- Region: Hong Kong (special administrative region)
- Country: China
- Constituencies: 37

Government
  - District Officer: Herman Cho
  - District Council Chairman: Vacant
  - District Council Vice-Chairman: Vacant

Area
  - Total: 18.9 km^{2} (7.3 sq mi)

Population (2011)
  - Total: 588,094
  - Density: 31,100/km^{2} (80,600/sq mi)
- Largest neighbourhood by population: Shau Kei Wan (85,188 – 2016 est)
- Website: District Website

Eastern District
- Traditional Chinese: 東區
- Simplified Chinese: 东区
- Cantonese Yale: Dūng kēui
- Jyutping: dung^{1} keoi^{1}
Transcriptions
Standard Mandarin
- Hanyu Pinyin: Dōng Qū
Wu
- Wugniu: ton^{1} chiu^{1}
- IPA: Shanghainese: [toŋ˥ tɕʰy˧]
Yue: Cantonese
- Yale Romanization: Dūng kēui
- Jyutping: dung^{1} keoi^{1}
- IPA: [tʊŋ˥ kʰɵɥ˥]

The Eastern District is one of the 18 administrative districts of Hong Kong, located on the northeastern part of Hong Kong Island. It had a population of 529,603 in 2021. The district has the second highest population, and its residents have the third highest median household income among the 18 districts.

The Eastern District is well-developed, with a complete public transport and transport network, including subway, bus, ferry, minibus and tram services, while the Island Eastern Corridor and the Eastern Harbour Crossing are important arteries for external traffic. There are educational, medical, community and recreational facilities in the area, as well as large shopping malls and commercial centres. At the same time, there are also many historical and cultural attractions in the Eastern District.

As the Hong Kong Government is determined to develop the Eastern District, many government departments such as the Customs and Excise Department, Fire Services Department, ICAC and the Water Supplies Department, have moved their headquarters and offices from Central and Wan Chai to the Eastern District. In addition, many multinational corporations from Central have moved to Taikoo Place, which has formed to become a new central business district. As such the Eastern District has undertaken some functions of being a political and economic centre in Hong Kong, which had only belonged to Central and Wan Chai.

== Geography ==
It is located in the northeastern part of the Hong Kong Island and includes the areas of Fortress Hill, North Point, Braemar Hill, Quarry Bay, Tai Koo Shing, Sai Wan Ho, Shau Kei Wan, Heng Fa Chuen, Chai Wan and Siu Sai Wan.

The eastern portion of Causeway Bay and Tin Hau were once in Eastern District, but were moved to Wan Chai District on 1 January 2016.

== History ==
Originally a backwater of fishing villages, quarries and dockyards, there are archaeological evidence there were villages and small towns appeared during the Song dynasty (AD 960–1279).

The Eastern District is now mostly residential, with some industrial areas and several large shopping malls. While mostly Home Ownership Scheme and public housing estates are located from Sai Wan Ho to Chai Wan, large private housing estates are also located within the eastern district, such as Taikoo Shing, Kornhill and Heng Fa Chuen. A commercial hub has been developed from the former industrial areas in western part of Quarry Bay. Hotels and commercial buildings are also developed near Fortress Hill along the coast.

In the past the district was linked by a single traffic artery, King's Road, which was notoriously congested during peak hours. This was largely resolved by the construction of the Island Eastern Corridor and the Island line within the MTR rapid transit system in the 1980s. It also contains the tram line, now over 100 years old, that runs near the sea shore from Shau Kei Wan west towards other districts.

== Demographics ==
According to the ninth survey of Hong Kong millionaires conducted by Citibank (Hong Kong) and The University of Hong Kong from November 2011 to January 2012, Eastern District is the area with the most millionaires in Hong Kong.

Also, according to the 2021 Population Census in Hong Kong, the population information of the Eastern District is as follows:

Demographics

- Population： 529,603
  - Under 15 years old： 9.8%
  - 15 to 24 years old： 6.8%
  - 25 to 64 years old： 60.5%
  - 65 years or above： 22.9%
- Median age： 48
- Proportion of never-married population aged 15 and over:
  - Male： 30.0%
  - Female： 27.4%
- Proportion of non-school population aged 20 and over with post-secondary education： 38.3%

Working population characteristics

- Working Population： 275,500
- Median age of working population： 44
- Labour force participation rate
  - Male： 63.2%
  - Female： 54.3%
  - Total： 58.2%

Household characteristics

- Number of households： 188,400
- Average size of household： 2.8
- Median Monthly Household Income of Households： HK$31,500

Housing characteristics

- Number of occupied quarters： 183,628
- Proportion of Owner-Owner Households in Total Domestic Households： 61.5%

== Community ==
=== Notable private housing estates ===
Name	Chinese name	Area	Completed	No. blocks	No. units	Developer	Photo	Coordinates
City Garden	城市花園	North Point	1980s	14	2,393	Cheung Kong		22.28637°N 114.19152°E
Grand Promenade	嘉亨灣	Sai Wan Ho	2006	5	2,020	Henderson Land Development, The Hongkong and Yaumati Ferry Co Ltd.		22.2850°N 114.2247°E
Heng Fa Chuen	杏花邨	Chai Wan	1982	48	6,504	MTR Corporation; Kerry Properties		22.2756°N 114.2416°E
Island Resort	藍灣半島	Chai Wan	2001	4	3,098	Sino Land		22.2655°N 114.2512°E
Kornhill	康怡花園	Quarry Bay	1986	44	8,831	Hang Lung Properties; New World Development; MTR Property		22.282778°N 114.216389°E
Lei King Wan	鯉景灣	Sai Wan Ho	1988	17	2,295	Swire Properties		22.1710°N 114.1325°E
Les Saisons	逸濤灣	Sai Wan Ho	2001	4	864	Swire Properties, China Motor Bus & Sun Hung Kai Properties		22.28377°N 114.22476°E
Nam Fung Sun Chuen	南豐新邨	Quarry Bay	1978	12	2,826	Nam Fung Group		22.2829°N 114.2134°E
Taikoo Shing	太古城	Quarry Bay	1980s	61	12,698	Swire Properties		22.2863°N 114.2176°E

- Koway Court
- Bayview Park
- Heng Fa Villa
- Shaukeiwan Plaza
- New Jade Garden
- Island Garden
- Perfect Mount Gardens
- Felicity Garden

- Westlands Gardens
- Sunway Gardens
- Mount Parker Lodge
- Kornville
- Parkvale
- The Orchards Tower
- The Floridian
- Healthy Gardens
- Bedford Garden
- Tanner Gardens

- Island Place
- Provident Centre
- Pacific Palisades
- Braemar Hill Mansions
- Fortress Metro Tower
- Fortress Garden
- Le Sommet
- Harbour Heights
- Viking Garden

=== Public estate under Home Ownership Scheme ===
Public estates under Home Ownership Scheme in the Eastern District are mainly concentrated in Sai Wan Ho, Shau Kei Wan and Chai Wan.

- Kornhill Garden
- Tung Chun Court
- Tung Hei Court
- Tung Lam Court
- Tung Yan Court
- Tung Shing Court
- Tung Yuk Court
- Aldrich Garden

- Tung Tao Court
- Shan Tsui Court Car Park
- Yee Tsui Court
- Walton Estate
- Yan Tsui Court
- Greenwood Terrace
- Neptune Terrace
- King Tsui Court

- Lok Hin Terrace
- Hang Tsui Court
- Yuet Chui Court
- Hiu Tsui Court
- Kai Tsui Court
- Fullview Garden
- Cheerful Garden
- Harmony Garden

=== Public housing estates ===
The public housing estates in the Eastern District are mainly concentrated in Shau Kei Wan, Chai Wan and Siu Sai Wan.

- Model Housing Estate
- Yiu Tung Estate
- Hing Tung Estate
- Hong Tung Estate
- Oi Tung Estate
- Chai Wan Estate

- Hing Wah Estate
- Yue Wan Estate
- Wan Tsui Estate
- Hing Man Estate
- Tsui Wan Estate
- Fung Wah Estate

- Tsui Lok Estate
- Wah Ha Estate
- Lin Tsui Estate
- Siu Sai Wan Estate
- Healthy Village
- Ming Wah Dai Ha

=== Shopping malls ===
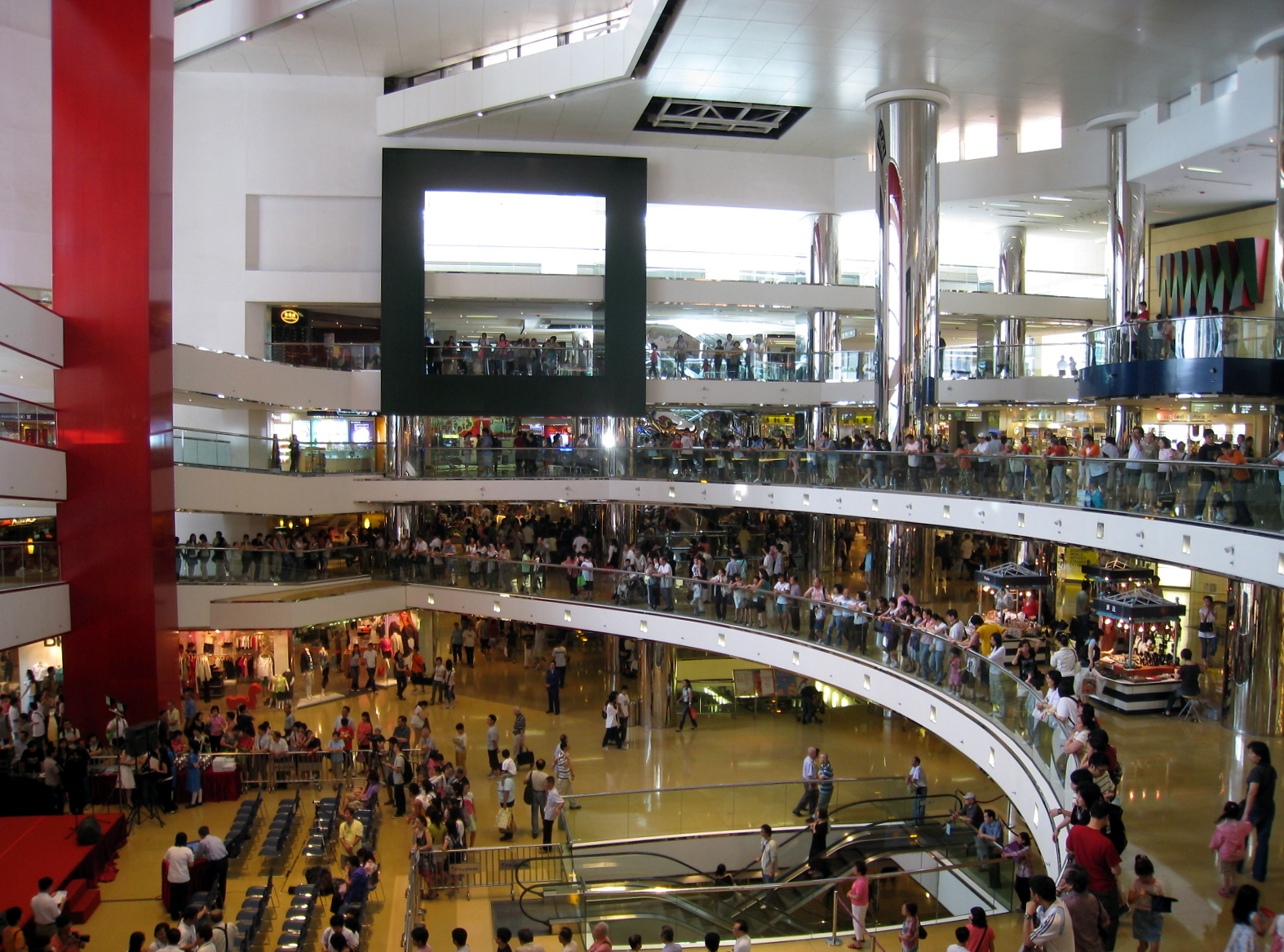
Cityplaza Phase 1

- Cityplaza
- Kornhill Plaza
- Island Resort Mall
- Island Place Mall
- Paradise Mall
- Harbour North
- New Jade Shopping Arcade

=== Commercial buildings ===
The offices of many multinational corporations like LVMH and BNP Paribas are located in the area of Eastern District, such as Taikoo Place, which makes the East District take over the functions of the new core business district and economic centre.

- Taikoo Place: One of the Central Business District in Hong Kong, where the commercial buildings include: One Island East, Devon House, Dorset House, Cambridge House, Lincoln House, Oxford House, Westlands Centre, Berkshire House, One Taikoo Place and Two Taikoo Place.
- Cityplaza
- AIA Tower
- K11 ATELIER King's Road
- 625 King's Road
- Chinachem Exchange Square
- Two Chinachem Exchange Square
- AIA Hong Kong Tower
- K. Wah Centre
- Kerry Centre
- E-Trade Plaza
- Harbour East

=== Government and judiciary organisations ===
As the Government of Hong Kong is determined to develop the Eastern District, many government departments have moved from Central and Wan Chai to the Eastern District, including many headquarters buildings, so that the Eastern District has undertaken some functions of the political centre that originally belonged to other districts.

- ICAC Building
- Customs Headquarters Building
- Water Supplies Department Hong Kong Regional Building
- Marine Regional Headquarters
- Fire Services Headquarters Building
- Eastern Law Courts Building
- North Point Government Offices (including headquarters of Lands Department, Planning Department Headquarters, Town Planning Board, Government Logistics Department)
- New Jade Garden Government Offices
- Hong Kong Council for Accreditation of Academic and Vocational Qualifications Headquarters
- Employees Retraining Board Headquarters
- Water Supplies Department Headquarters with Hong Kong and Islands Regional Office and Correctional Services Department Headquarters Building in Chai Wan (expected to be completed in 2024–25)
- Chai Wan Government Complex and Vehicle Depot (expected to be completed in 2024–25)

In addition, the Securities and Futures Commission is headquartered in Taikoo PlaceOne Island East, the Accounting and Financial Reporting Council is headquartered in Two Taikoo Place, Hong Kong Housing Society is headquartered at 1063 King's Road, Consumer Council is headquartered in K. Wah Centre, Tourism Commission is headquartered in Harbour East, Fortress Hill, and Estate Agents Authority is headquartered in E-Trade Plaza, Chai Wan.

== Public facilities ==
=== Education ===
==== Tertiary education ====
- Hong Kong Shue Yan University
- Hong Kong Institute of Vocational Education (Chai Wan)
- Technological and Higher Education Institute of Hong Kong
- School for Higher and Professional Education
- HKU School of Professional and Continuing Education (HKU SPACE) - Island East Campus & Fortress Tower Learning Centre
- Hong Kong Art School - Shau Kei Wan Campus & Chai Wan Campus

==== Primary and secondary schools ====
Secondary education

- Belilios Public School
- Clementi Secondary School
- Henrietta Secondary School
- Canossa College
- Cheung Chuk Shan College
- CCC Kwei Wah Shan College
- Man Kiu College
- Fortress Hill Methodist Secondary School
- Hong Kong Chinese Women's Club College

- St. Mark's School
- Munsang College Hong Kong Island
- Salesian English School
- Shau Kei Wan Government Secondary School
- Shau Kei Wan East Government Secondary School
- Lingnan Secondary School
- Precious Blood Secondary School
- Cognitio College (Hong Kong)
- Chong Gene Hang College
- Caritas Chai Wan Marden Foundation Secondary School

- SKH Li Fook Hing Secondary School
- Islamic Kasim Tuet Memorial College
- Christian Nationals' Evangelism Commission Lau Wing Sang Secondary School
- The Methodist Church Hong Kong Wesley College
- Lingnan Hang Yee Memorial Secondary School
- Pui Kiu Middle School
- Kiangsu-Chekiang College
- Fukien Secondary School
- Hon Wah College
- The Chinese Foundation Secondary School

Primary education

- Pun U Association Wah Yan Primary School
- HKUGA Primary School
- SKH St. Michael's Primary School
- Tai Koo Primary School
- Buddhist Chung Wah Kornhill Primary School
- Canossa School Hong Kong
- North Point Government Primary School
- North Point Methodist Primary School
- Chinese Methodist School North Point
- Chan's Creative School (H.K. Island)
- Shanghai Alumni Primary School
- Chinese Methodist School, Tanner Hill

- SKH Chai Wan Saint Michael's Primary School
- Shaukiwan Tsung Tsin School
- Salesian School
- Meng Tak Catholic School
- Shau Kei Wan Government Primary School
- ELCHK Faith Love Lutheran School
- St. Mark's Primary School
- The H.K.C.W.C. Hioe Tjo Yoeng Primary School
- The Church of Christ in China Kei Wan Primary School
- C.C.C Keiwan Primary School (Aldrich Bay)

- Salvation Army Ann Wyllie Memorial School
- The Endeavourers Leung Lee Sau Yu Memorial Primary School
- Aldrich Bay Government Primary School
- Pui Kiu Primary School
- The Salvation Army Centaline Charity Fund School
- Hon Wah College (Primary Section)
- Kiangsu & Chekiang Primary School

International schools

- Quarry Bay School
- Chinese International School
- French International School
- DSC International School Hong Kong
- Korean International School
- Carmel School of Hong Kong

Special schools

- Po Leung Kuk Yu Lee Mo Fan Memorial School
- R.c.h.k. Island West Hong Chi Morninghope School
- Caritas Lok Yi School

==== Public libraries ====
Hong Kong Public Libraries operates the Chai Wan, Electric Road (North Point address), North Point, Quarry Bay, Siu Sai Wan, and Yiu Tung (in Shau Kei Wan) libraries.

=== Medical services ===
Public clinic

- Lady Robert Black Clinic
- Chai Wan Maternal and Child Health Centre
- Sai Wan Ho Health Centre
- Shau Kei Wan Jockey Club Clinic
- Wan Tsui Government Clinic

Public hospitals (Hong Kong East Cluster)

- Pamela Youde Nethersole Eastern Hospital – Regional acute hospital with comprehensive specialty services

Private clinic

- HKSH Eastern Medical Centre

=== Leisure ===
Museum

- Law Uk Folk Museum
- Hong Kong Film Archive
- Hong Kong Museum of Coastal Defence
- Fireboat Alexander Grantham Exhibition Gallery

Arts and cultural

- Oi!
- Youth Square
- Eastern District Cultural Square

Library

- North Point Public Library
- Quarry Bay Public Library
- Chai Wan Public Library
- Electric Road Public Library
- Yiu Tung Public Library
- Siu Sai Wan Public Library
- District Library and Residential Care Home for the Elderly in the Joint User Complex at Lei King Road (expected to be completed in 2023–24)

Community centers and halls

- Sai Wan Ho Civic Centre
- Aldrich Bay Community Hall
- Quarry Bay Community Hall
- St. James' Settlement
- Youth Outreach Jockey Club Building
- Hong Kong Federation of Youth Groups Building
- TWGHs Fong Shu Chuen Social Service Building

Sports centres

- Chai Wan Sports Centre
- Siu Sai Wan Sports Centre
- Island East Sports Centre
- Java Road Sports Centre
- Quarry Bay Sports Centre
- Sai Wan Ho Sports Centre

Swimming pools

- Chai Wan Swimming Pool
- Siu Sai Wan Swimming Pool
- Island East Swimming Pool

Park

- East Coast Park Precinct
- Quarry Bay Park
- Chai Wan Park
- Choi Sai Woo Park
- Aldrich Bay Park
- Aldrich Bay Promenade
- Sai Wan Ho Harbour Park
- Pak Fuk Road Safety Town

Grass pitches

- Siu Sai Wan Sports Ground
- Quarry Bay Park

Public holiday village

- Lei Yue Mun Park and Holiday Village

Country parks and trails

- Tai Tam Country Park (Quarry Bay Extension) (as known as Quarry Bay Country Park)
- Red Incense Burner Summit
- Sir Cecil's Ride
- Eastern District Tourist Trail
- Quarry Bay Tree Walk
- Mount Parker Road Green Trail
- Leaping Dragon Walk
- Cape Collinson

Churches and temples

- Holy Cross Church
- St. Jude Church
- Salesian Mission House
- Savio House
- Tsung Tsin Mission of Hong Kong Shaukiwan Church
- Chinese Methodist Church North Point
- Church of Christ in China Kei Wan Church
- Hong Kong Sheng Kung Hui Saint Peter's Church North
- Chai Wan Baptist Church
- Star of the Sea Catholic Church
- Taoism Temple, Quarry Bay
- Tin Hau Temple, Shau Kei Wan
- Tam Kung Temple, Shau Kei Wan
- Yuk Wong Po Din, Shau Kei Wan
- Shing Wong Temple, Shau Kei Wan (Shau Kei Wan City God Temple)
- Fuk Tak Temple, Shau Kei Wan
- Tin Hau Temple, Chai Wan
- Cape Collison Masjid مسجد

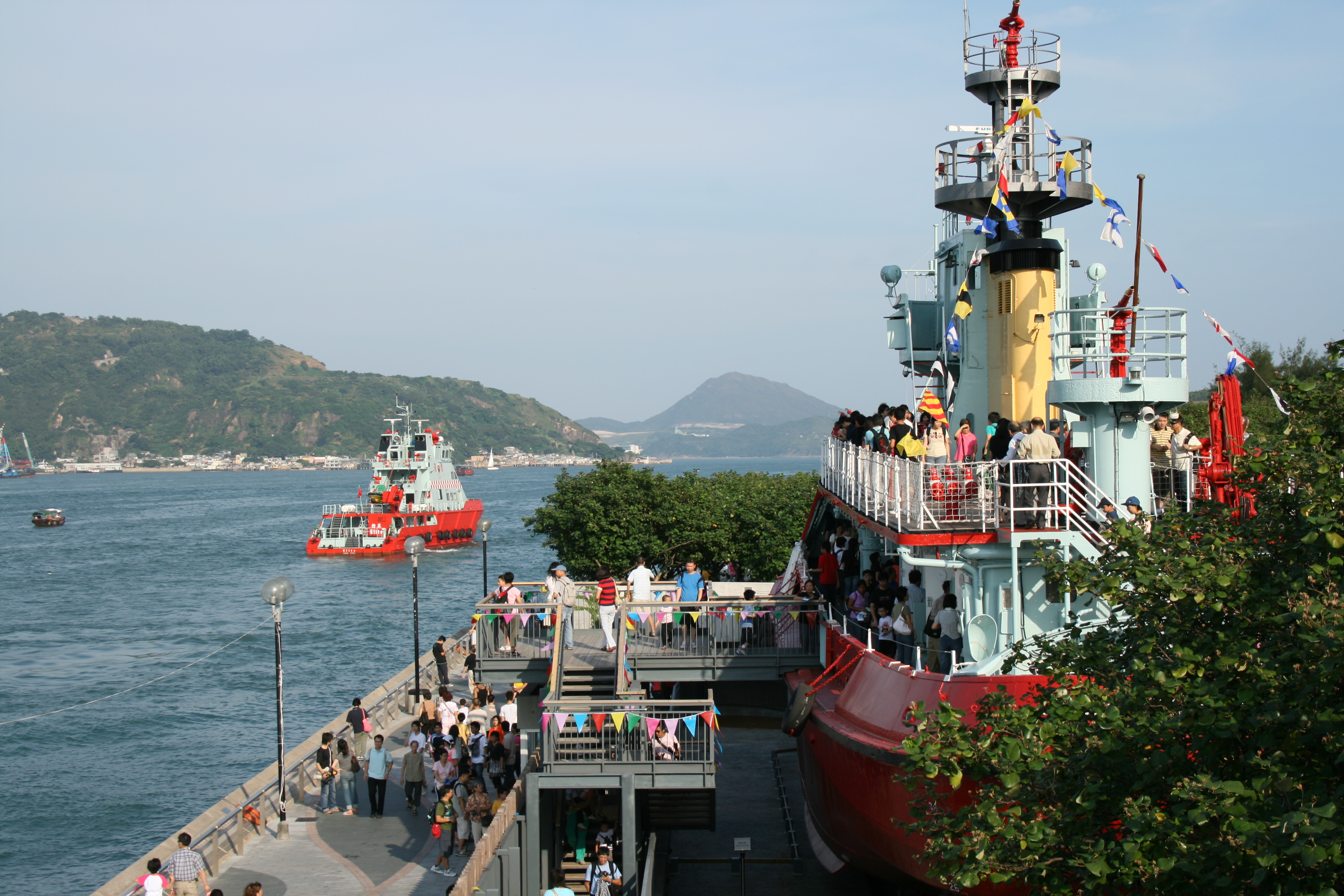
Fireboat Alexander Grantham Exhibition Gallery

== Tourist attractions ==
- SoHo East
- Quarry Bay Park
- Law Uk Folk Museum
- Hong Kong Film Archive
- Hong Kong Museum of Coastal Defence

- East Coast Park Precinct
- Tai On Building
- Sunbeam Theatre
- Tin Hau Temple, Shau Kei Wan
- Tam Kung Temple, Shau Kei Wan

=== Hospitality ===
- EAST Hong Kong
- Harbour Grand Hong Kong
- Hyatt Centric Victoria Harbour Hong Kong
- Hotel Alexandra Hong Kong
- Harbour Plaza North Point
- City Garden Hotel

- iclub Fortress Hill Hotel
- Ramada Hong Kong Grand View
- ibis Hong Kong North Point
- Youth Square Y-loft
- M1 Hotel North Point
- Shama Island North Hong Kong

== Economic development ==
=== Commercial ===
Commercial buildings and hotels in the Eastern District are concentrated in Fortress Hill, Taikoo Shing and Quarry Bay. The main building is Taikoo Place, the tallest in the Eastern District since April 2008 SkyscraperHong Kong Island East Center Occupied in stages.

=== Industrial ===
Industrial buildings are concentrated in the east of North Point, Chai Wan Pier and Chai Wan Road near the MTR station.

=== Household income ===
North Point, Quarry Bay and Sai Wan Ho are one of the most expensive urban residential areas in traditional locations, with convenient transportation and the fourth highest median income in Hong Kong. There are 15 public housing estates in Shau Kei Wan and Chai Wan, and 23 HOS housing estates, resulting in a large income gap within the Eastern District. However, public housing has also injected grassroots labour into the Eastern District, enabling the middle-class population in the Eastern District to enjoy cheaper services, so the urban planning of the Eastern District has been very successful.

== See also ==
- List of places in Hong Kong
