= Yiu Tung Estate =

Public housing estate in Shau Kei Wan, Hong Kong

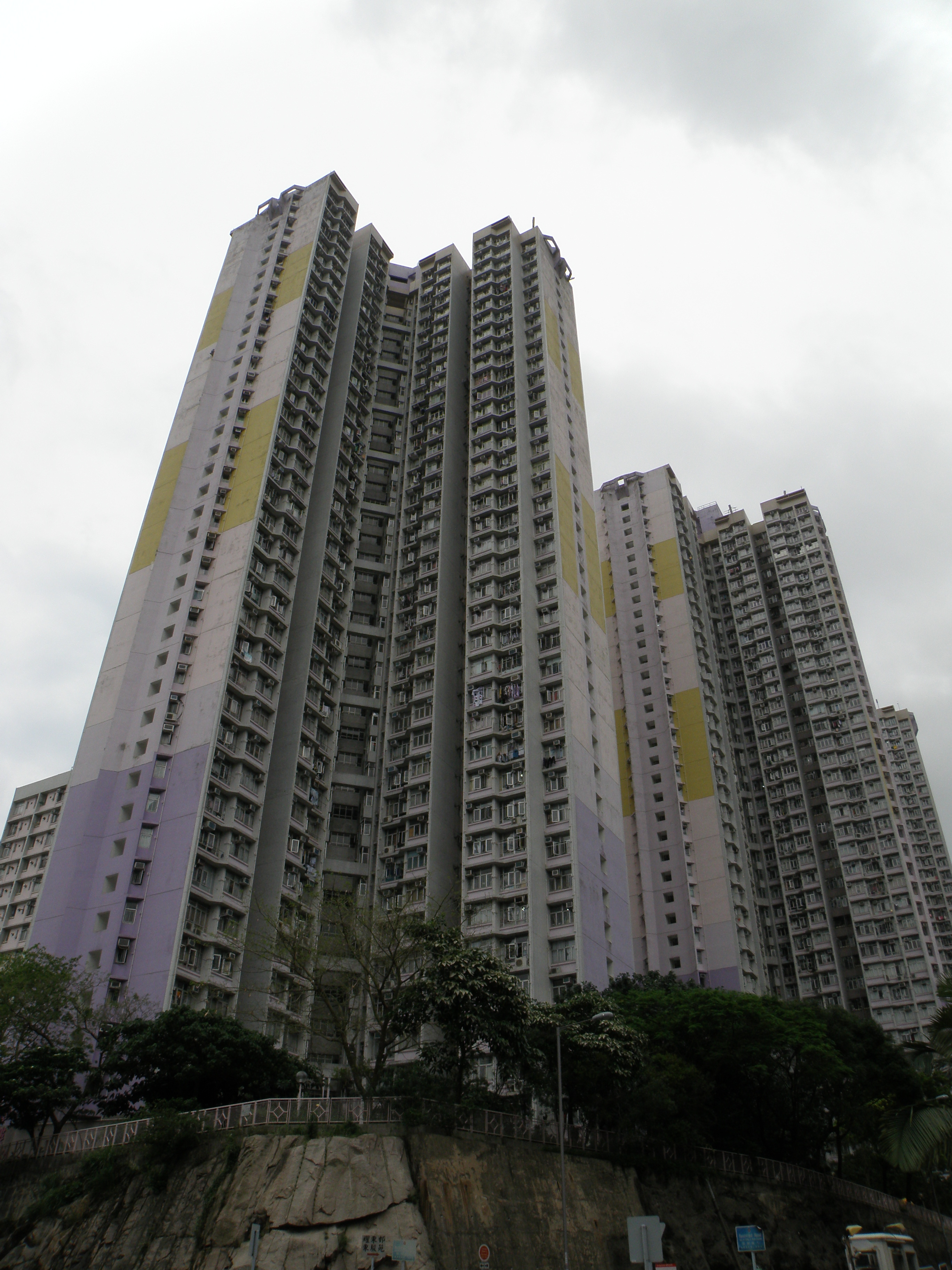
- Yiu Tung Estate
- Interactive map of Yiu Tung Estate

General information
- Location: 39 Yiu Hing Road, Shau Kei Wan; Hong Kong Island, Hong Kong
- Coordinates: 22.27745°N 114.22235°E
- Status: Completed
- Category: Public rental housing
- Population: 15,244 (2016)
- No. of blocks: 11
- No. of units: 5,305

Construction
- Constructed: 1994; 32 years ago
- Authority: Hong Kong Housing Authority

Yiu Tung Estate (Chinese: 耀東邨) is a public housing estate in Shau Kei Wan, Hong Kong Island, Hong Kong. The estate was constructed in a former squatter areas at a hill in Southwest Shau Kei Wan and consists of 11 residential buildings built in 1994 and 1995 respectively. The Yiu Tung Public Library is located within the estate.

Tung Chun Court (東駿苑) and Tung Shing Court (東盛苑) are Home Ownership Scheme housing courts in a former squatter areas at a hill in Southwest Shau Kei Wan, near Yiu Tung Estate, built in 1994 and 2000 respectively.

== History ==
The foothills of Shau Kei Wan were once home to a vast area of squatter villages. In the mid-1980s, the government launched a plan to clear the squatter huts, resettle the inhabitants, and redevelop the area into modern and safe public housing. Clearance work began in 1987. The area became Yiu Tung Estate and Hing Tung Estate.

In early 1992, Yau Lee Holdings was awarded the HK$231-million contract to build the second phase of Yiu Tung Estate.

Visiting dignitaries were brought to the estate when it was new. During a January 1996 visit to Hong Kong, foreign secretary Malcolm Rifkind was given a tour by Chris Patten. Patten also brought Labour MP Derek Fatchett to Yiu Tung Estate in December 1996.

== Houses ==
=== Yiu Tung Estate ===
Name	Chinese name	Building type	Completed
Yiu Lok House	耀樂樓	Harmony 1	1994
Yiu Fook House	耀福樓	Harmony 1	1994
Yiu Fu House	耀富樓	Harmony 1	1994
Yiu Wah House	耀華樓	Harmony 1	1994
Yiu Fung House	耀豐樓	Harmony 3	1994
Yiu On House	耀安樓	Harmony 3	1994
Yiu Kwai House	耀貴樓	Harmony 3	1995
Yiu Cheong House	耀昌樓	Harmony 3	1995
Yiu Hing House	耀興樓	Harmony 3	1995
Yiu Fai House	耀輝樓	Harmony 3	1995
Yiu Ming House	耀明樓	Harmony 3	1995

=== Tung Chun Court ===
Name	Chinese name	Building type	Completed
Kam Chun House	金駿閣	Harmony 1	1994
Ngan Chun House	銀駿閣	Harmony 1	1994

=== Tung Shing Court ===
Name	Chinese name	Building type	Completed
Tung Shing Court	東盛苑	New Cruciform (Ver.1984)	2000

== Demographics ==
According to the 2016 by-census, Yiu Tung Estate had a population of 15,244 while Tung Chun Court had a population of 3,442. Altogether the population amounts to 18,686.

== Politics ==
For the 2019 District Council election, the estate fell within two constituencies. Most of the estate and Tung Shing Court are located in the Lower Yiu Tung constituency, which is represented by Ho Wai-lun, while the remainder of the estate and Tung Chun Court falls within the Upper Yiu Tung constituency, which is represented by Chow Cheuk-ki.

== See also ==
- Public housing estates in Shau Kei Wan
