= Hing Tung (constituency) =

Hong Kong constituency

- Elected constituency for the Eastern District Council
- Boundary of Hing Tung in Eastern District
- District: Eastern
- Legislative Council constituency: Hong Kong Island East
- Population: 17,972 (2019)
- Electorate: 12,998 (2019)

Current constituency
- Created: 1999
- Number of members: One
- Member: Vacant

Hing Tung (Chinese: 興東) is one of the 35 constituencies in the Eastern District.

The constituency returns one district councillor to the Eastern District Council, with an election every four years. The seat is lastly held by Cheung Chun-kit.

Hing Tung has estimated population of 17,972.

== Councillors represented ==
Election	Member	Party
1999	Wong Yuet-mui	Democratic
2011	Hui Lam-hing	Independent
201?	Hui Lam-hing	FTU
2019	Cheung Chun-kit→Vacant (Note: Resigned on 8 July 2021.)	HTTHECG

== Election results ==
=== 2010s ===
Eastern District Council Election, 2019: Hing Tung
Party	Candidate	Votes	%	±%
HTTHECG	Cheung Chun-kit	5,389	57.82	
FTU	Hui Lam-hing	3,932	42.18	
Majority		1,457	15.64	
Turnout		9,346	71.93	
HTTHECG gain from FTU		Swing		
