= Shau Kei Wan =

Area in Hong Kong

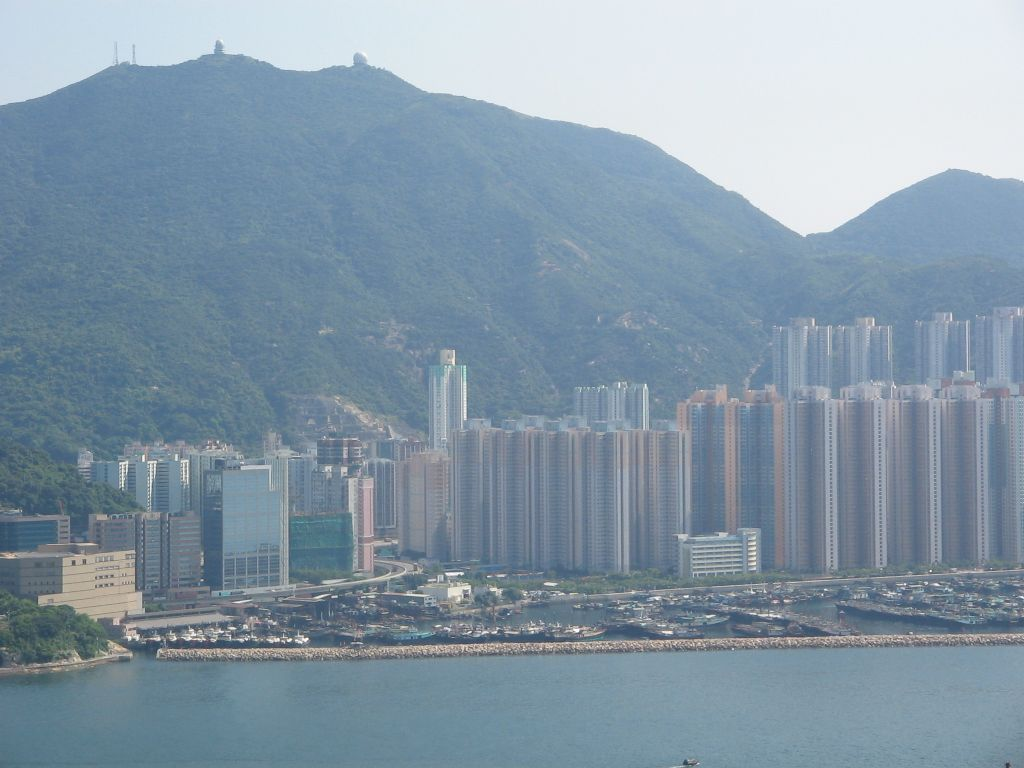
- View of Shau Kei Wan and Shaukeiwan Typhoon Shelter. Mount Parker is in the background.
- Traditional Chinese: 筲箕灣
- Simplified Chinese: 筲箕湾
- Literal meaning: Winnow Basket Bay
Transcriptions
Standard Mandarin
- Hanyu Pinyin: Shāojīwān
Yue: Cantonese
- Jyutping: Saau1 gei1 waan1

Shau Kei Wan or Shaukiwan is a neighborhood in the Eastern District of Hong Kong Island. The area is bordered by Chai Wan to the east, Mount Parker to the south, Sai Wan Ho to the west, and Victoria Harbour to the north.

Shau Kei Wan is considered as an area surrounded by A Kung Ngam Road and A Kung Ngam Village Road to the east, Yiu Hing Road and Shau Kei Wan Road to the south, Junction of Aldrich Bay Road and Shau Kei Wan Road to the west, and Oi Kan Road to the north.

== Etymology ==
Shau Kei is the Chinese word for a basket used to wash rice, much like a colander, and Wan means "bay". The name, which appeared at least as early as the Ming dynasty in the book The Great Chronicles of Yue (Chinese: 粵大記, albeit written as Chinese: 稍箕灣), refers to the former shape of the nearby bay, which is now named Aldrich Bay, after a British Army major who improved troop discipline.

Another name for the area is Ngor Yan Wan (餓人灣; 'Bay of Starving Men'). Legend has it the name came about after a group of British merchants were marooned in the area following a typhoon in the 18th century, only to find that there was no food to buy in the area.

== History ==
In the early 18th century, local fishermen discovered Shau Kei Wan as a good storm shelter and eventually, the fishing population began to move into the area, away from Chai Wan, which housed most of the fishing populations for years. Also, Hakka people from Huizhou began to move into the area to operate quarries during this time, and began building houses along the coastline. The population grew, and by the 1841 Hong Kong census, the area housed approximately 1,200 people, roughly 5% of Hong Kong Island's population. Most of the residents in the area lived in fishing boats at the time.

By 1860, piracy became a serious issue, and Colonial Governor Richard Macdonnell began to crack down on crime and revitalise the area. During the process, the entire area was replanned with proper roads and housing. Police dispatch posts were also built for the authorities to better combat piracy.

At the time of the 1911 census, the population of Shau Kei Wan was 5,908. The number of males was 4,317. Life for Shau Kei Wan as an industrial area began in the 1920s, when light industries began to move into the area.

After World War II, Shau Kei Wan gradually developed into a fish-trading market (a position it still holds today). Also, many Mainland China refugees began to settle into the area at this time, and built around 13 mountain villages in the ensuing years. Most of them were slum houses, and sanitations in those areas were generally atrocious. In the 1960s, the Hong Kong Government began to replan the area once more, building public housing estates and beginning landfill projects. The plans went ahead slowly until 1975, when a large fire burnt down many of the slum houses in the Aldrich Bay Typhon Shelter which were built along the shore & over the water of the bay. Afterwards, the government began to bulldoze slum areas and built public housing in its place.

Today, Shau Kei Wan is a densely populated residential district. However, the change over the years has come with a cost: it is said that the coastline has suffered a great change since the late 19th century.

== Sights ==
=== Eastern District Tourist Trail (Shau Kei Wan Section) ===
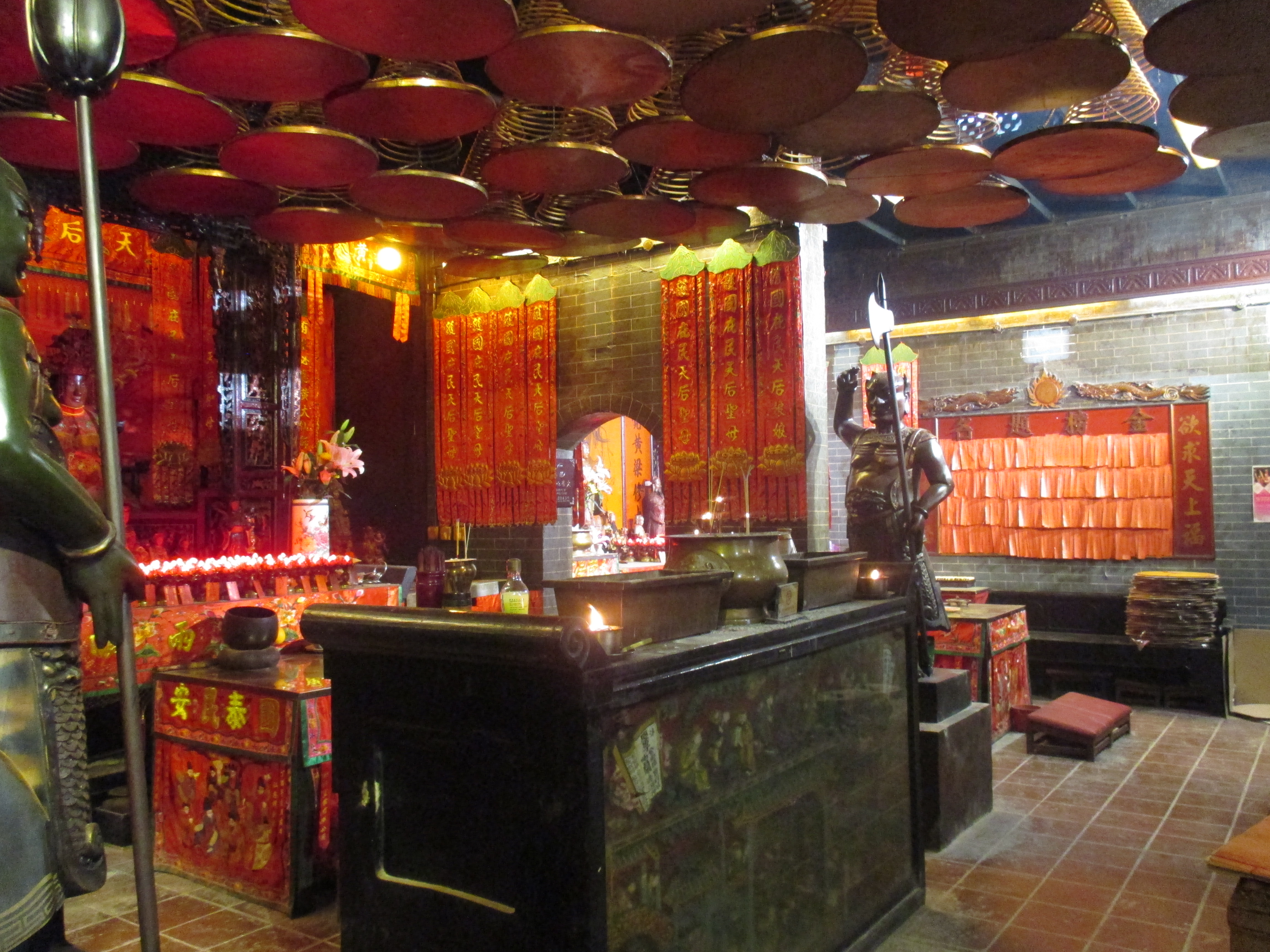
Interior of Tin Hau Temple, located along Shau Kei Wan Main Street East.

Hidden amidst the high-rise residential towers of the Eastern District is a trail that will showcase the hustle and bustle of everyday life in the area. Visitors can discover vestiges of Hong Kong's seafaring past at the A Kung Ngam Shipyards and the Shau Kei Wan Wholesale Fish Market. (The sea has always been an important part of life in Shau Kei Wan. Its name comes from the shape of the neighbouring bay: shau kei means "colander" and wan means "bay".)

The historical trail starts at the tram terminus and heads along Shau Kei Wan Main Street East towards the waterfront before ending at the Hong Kong Museum of Coastal Defence. Along the way, you will see temples dedicated to different gods: Shing Wong, Tin Hau, Tam Kung and Yuk Wong.

=== Shau Kei Wan Main Street East ===
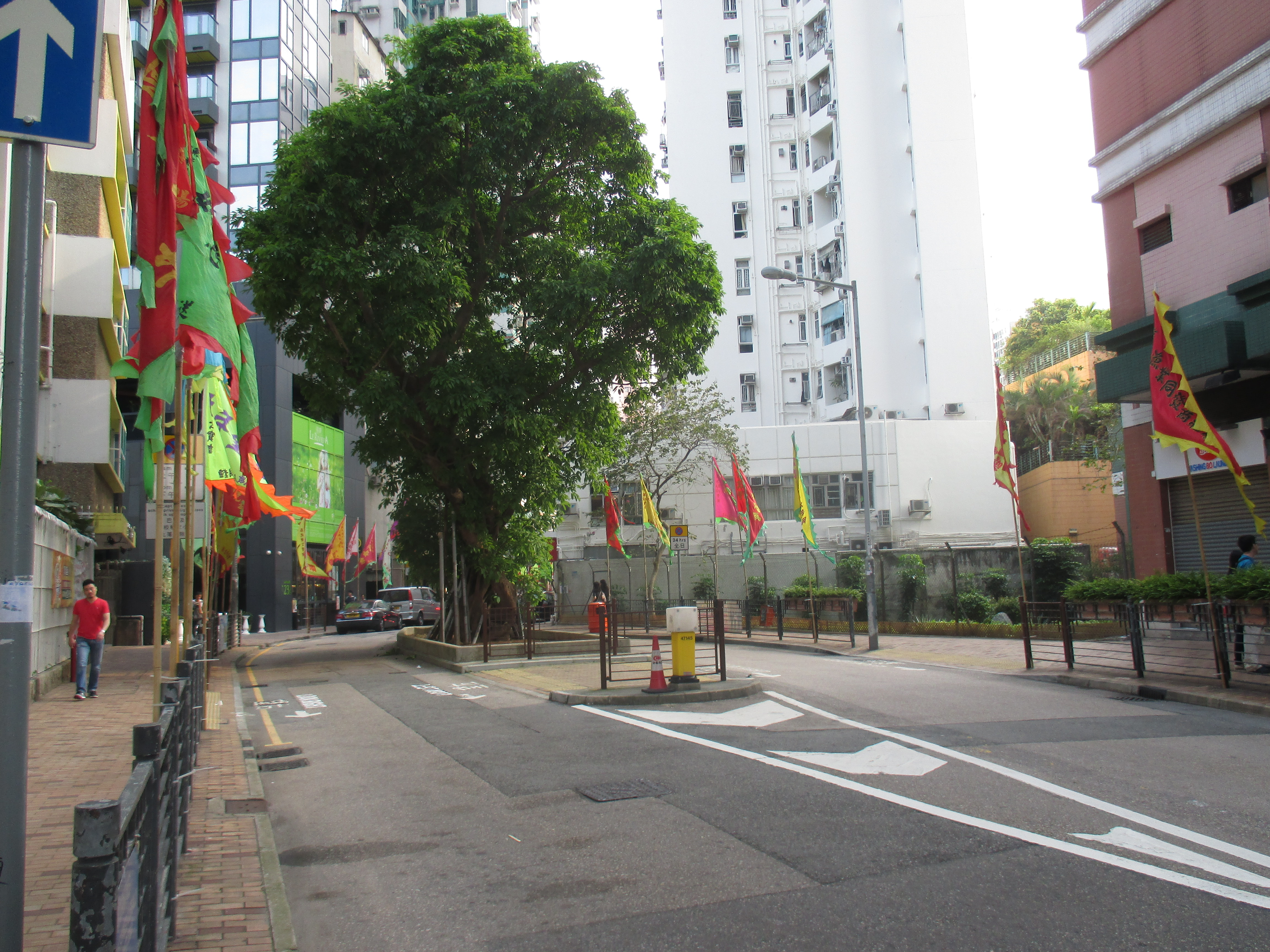
Shau Kei Wan Main Street East and fig tree

Shau Kei Wan Main Street East (筲箕灣東大街) is one of the most important streets in Shau Kei Wan district. In the 19th century, the street was on the waterfront. In 1860s, to crack down the pirates hiding in the area, the Hong Kong government decided to open up the area and to build houses and stores on the two sides of the road.

Today, restaurants and groceries handed down from the past still operate along the street while the old houses have been replaced by modern high-rises. It becomes a popular dining place with a myriad of well-known international restaurants and street food stores.

When the street was widened the hundred-year-old fig tree in the middle of the street was preserved on the request of the community. The botanical name of this old fig is Ficus superba.

=== Hong Kong Museum of the War of Resistance and Coastal Defence ===
A famous tourist attraction of Shau Kei Wan is the Hong Kong Museum of the War of Resistance and Coastal Defence. It is a museum located near Lei Yue Mun with a total area of 34,200 square meters. The redoubt was built by the British in 1887 and was originally built for coastal defence, especially for the east Victoria Harbour, but it is currently an exhibition center. Inside, there are forts, a defence basement, military vehicles, weapons, and naval signs, crests, and emblems on display.

=== Shau Kei Wan Wholesale Fish Market ===
One important primary product of Hong Kong is marine fish. Fresh marine fish are distributed to outside retail market after wholesaling in Shau Kei Wan Wholesale Marine Fish Market, which is located at 37 Tam Kung Temple Road, Shau Kei Wan (22°17′00″N 114°13′57″E). Facilities for the landing and wholesale of fresh marine fish are provided. It is one of the seven wholesale fish market operated by the Fish Market Organization. It is currently the second largest in Hong Kong, after the one in Aberdeen.

=== Temples ===
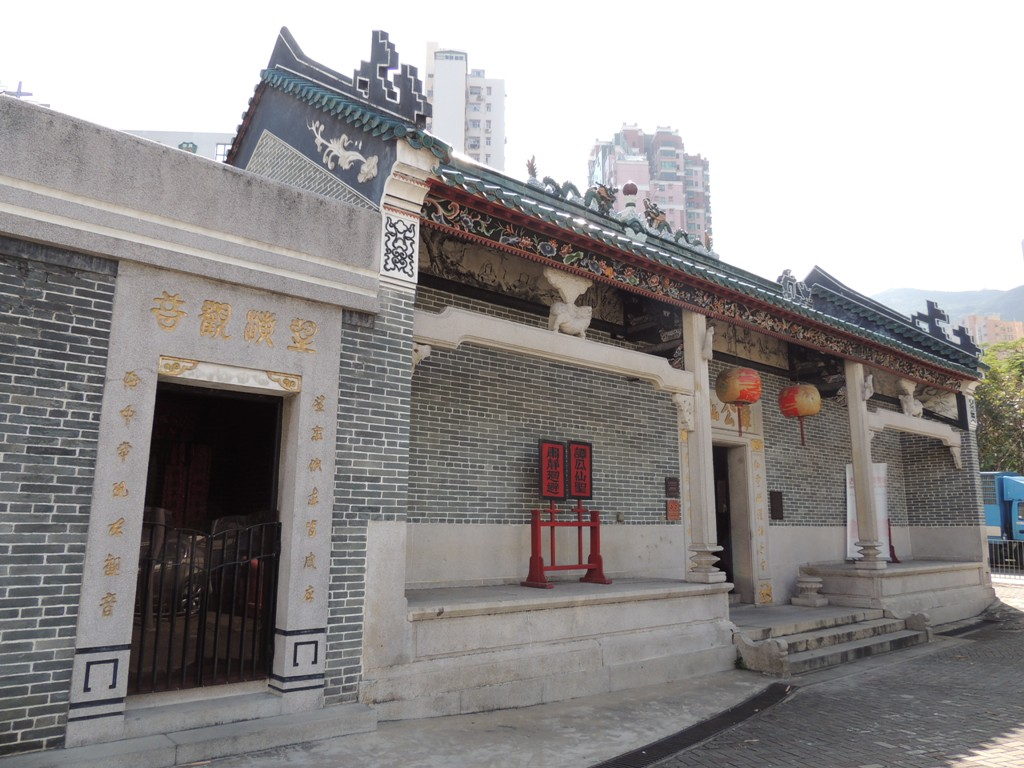
Tam Kung Temple, Shau Kei Wan

Developed from a fishing village, special religious beliefs are formed. Besides worshiping Tin Hau, residents, who were historically mainly fishermen, also worship Tam Kung. It is believed that since Tam Kung can control the weather and heal the sick, people worship Tam Kung for a safe return from the sea. Tam Kung is a unique religious belief in Hong Kong and temples worshiping Tam Kung can mostly be found here.

There are temples on Shau Kei Wan Main Street East which are dedicated to Shing Wong, Tin Hau, Tam Kung and Yuk Wong. Tin Hau Temple and Tam Kung Temple are relatively famous. In the past, fishermen worshiped them for safety at sea. Although the fishing industry in the area has been diminishing, the tradition still continues.

=== Tsung Tsin Church ===
Located on Basel Road adjacent to Shau Kei Wan Main Street East, the church was built in 1862 by local Hakka and priests from the Swiss Basel Church. It was originally built to a country house style. After reconstruction in 1933, it became a well established church. It was occupied as the temporary headquarters of military police during the Japanese invasion in 1941. In 1958, a school was built next to it. After that, it was rebuilt and used as church again and was expanded in 1984.

== Community ==
=== Shopping Centres ===
There are several shopping arcades in Shau Kei Wan, such as Yiu Tung Shopping Centre, Oi Tung Shopping Centre, Hing Tung Shopping Centre and SoHo East. Each is located underneath a housing estate, and was built mainly for the residents in that area. The structure and the interior design of these shopping centres are different from those found in Central; the emphasis is placed on the internal function and practical space rather than detailed decoration or facade. The shopping units inside include stores such as supermarket, Chinese restaurants and clothes shop. The goods here are relatively cheaper and usually are commodities.

=== Public facilities ===
There are recreational facilities for the public. There is also the Island East Sports Centre (港島東體育館), a sport complex which provides various sports facilities such as gym rooms and ball courts.

=== Hospitals ===
The Shau Kei Wan Jockey Club Clinic provides various medical services, such as maternal and child health, and family health. The nearby UMP Aldrich Garden Medical Centre also offers medical care to local residents. Various private clinics are located in different housing estates.

Dental service is provided by a satellite location of Yan Chai Hospital, located on the main street of Shau Kei Wan. It was built to serve other nearby areas such as Chai Wan along with Shau Kei Wan.

=== Authority office ===
There are also some authority offices located at Shau Kei Wan, such as The Film Service Office. It aims to promote film relevant service to local area. Details can be referred to the official site.

=== Cinema ===
- L Cinema Shau Kei Wan

== Housing development ==
=== Implementation ===
A long term strategic implementation is taken up by The Housing Society and the Urban Renewal Authority (URA). URA will focus on project on Shau Kei Wan Road and Nam On Street.

The stage of the project is now at the beginning, the 17 buildings that will be acquired are over 40 years old. Project is expected to be finished on 2009 and will provide 300 residential units.

=== Project Information ===
Site Area	1,890 square meters
No. of affected buildings	17
No. of affected households	about 230
No. of affected shops	about 35
No. of affected property interests	about 130

=== Development Content ===
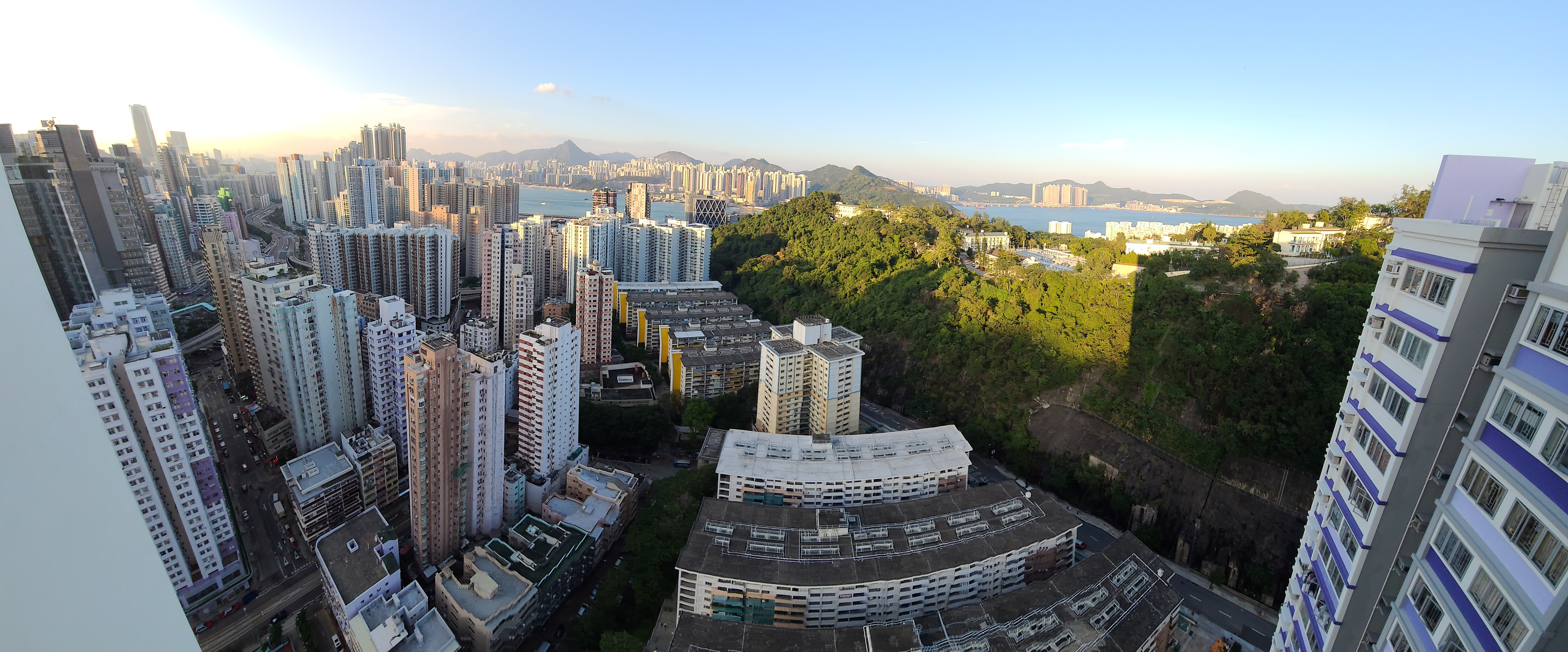
Overlooking Victoria Harbour and Shau Kei Wan from Ming Wah Dai Ha

Residential	about 17,800 square meters
Commercial	about 1,700 square meters

Housing developments in Shau Kei Wan include:

- Aldrich Garden
- Ming Wah Dai Ha
- Oi Tung Estate
- Tung Shing Court
- Tung Chun Court
- Tung Yuk Court
- Tung Tao Court
- Yiu Tung Estate

== Environment ==
There are two Champion Trees in Shau Kei Wan, both of which are located on Shau Kei Wan Main Street East by the side of the road. One is located beside Shau Kei Wan Government School. It is a large-leaved banyan. The other is a Coconut Palm, which is located in front of the Urban Council market.

== Transportation ==
=== In the past ===
In earlier times, Shau Kei Wan, along with the rest of the Island, did not have a good transportation system. This, coupled with the relative distance of Central and Wan Chai (other population centers of the time), made transportation rather inconvenient.

For most of its modern history, Shau Kei Wan's major connection with the rest of the island was King's Road (英皇道). Its only major connection with its eastern neighbour of Chai Wan was Chai Wan Road (柴灣道), which was notorious for its steep incline.

In 1904, a single-track tram service between North Point (北角) and Shau Kei Wan was established.

After World War II, Hong Kong experienced a population boom, and factories, along with people, started to move into Shau Kei Wan. This created considerable congestion, and public buses began to serve the area in an effort to alleviate the problem. Their efforts proved to be ineffective, and congestion continued up until the point where the MTR and the Island Eastern Corridor were completed and introduced to the region. To further alleviate congestion problems, ferry companies began a service from Shau Kei Wan to Central to get people to work on time.

All of these transportation impediments gave birth to a once-popular maxim: " (英雄被困筲箕灣，不知何日到中環". This translates to "A 'hero' is trapped in Shau Kei Wan without knowing which day he will reach Central."

Nowadays, as different means of transportation are well developed, one can travel between the two places within very short time, even if one takes the slow tram.

=== Tram ===
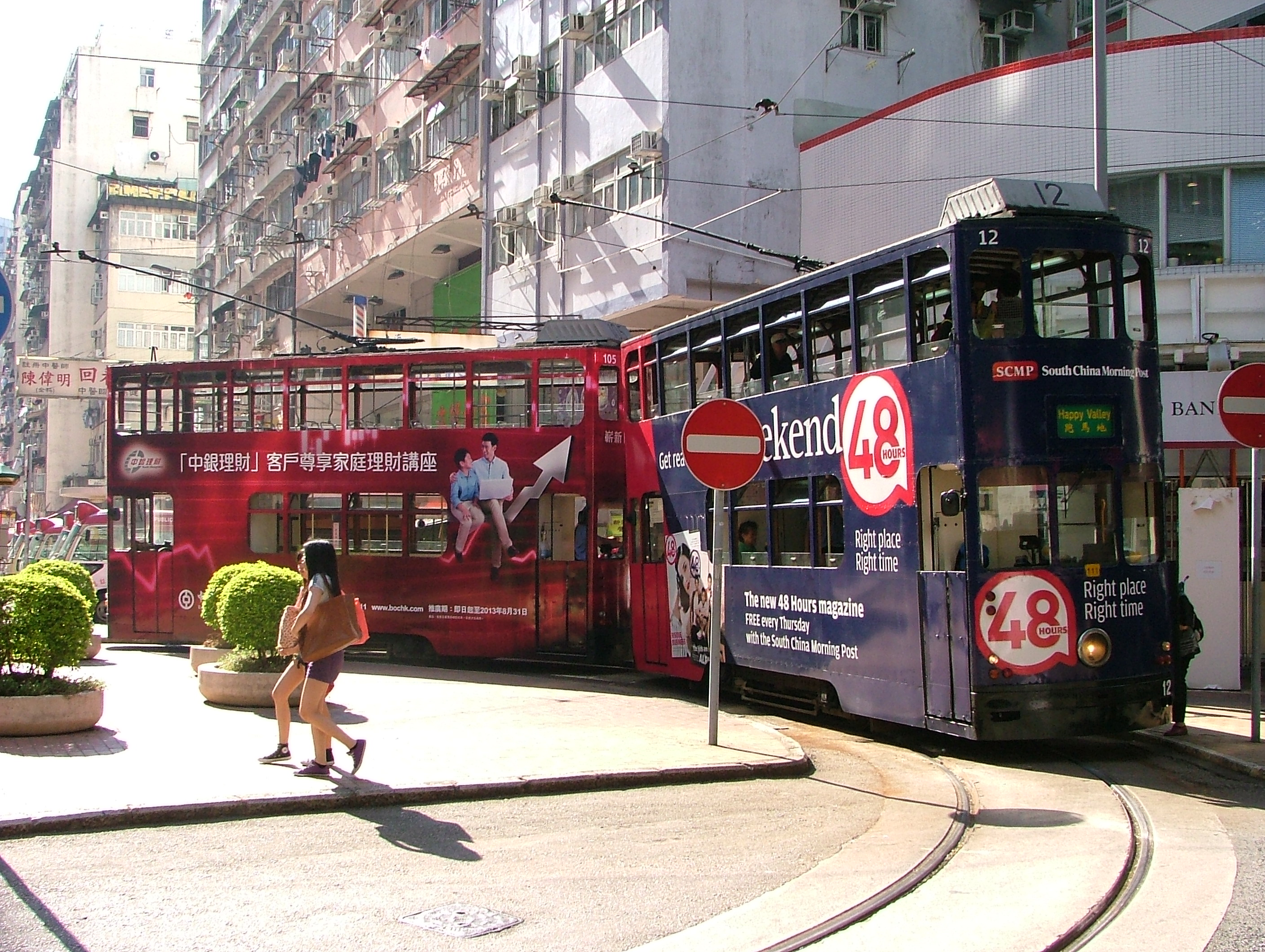
Shau Kei Wan tram terminus.

One of the seven Hong Kong Tramways termini is located in Shau Kei Wan. It is at the junction of Shau Kei Wan Main Street East and Kam Wa Street. The track system runs east from Sai Wan Ho to the west of the northern part of Hong Kong Island linking Shau Kei Wan and Kennedy Town. It is the longest tram track in Hong Kong while the whole track system was completed in 1904. Although there exists various types of transportation, some residents still prefer using trams because of tradition and the extremely low fare.

=== MTR ===
Shau Kei Wan is served by the station of the same name on the Island line of the MTR metro system. The station is between Sai Wan Ho and Heng Fa Chuen. The MTR connects Shau Kei Wan to the rest of Hong Kong Island and Kowloon. It takes 18 minutes to travel to Central, and 26 minutes to travel to Mong Kok.

=== Bus ===
There are over 20 bus lines passing through Shau Kei Wan which connects Shau Kei Wan to other districts. Passengers can take routes 2, 2X, 9, 18X, 33X, 77, 99, 102, 102P, 110, 608, 613, 720, 720A, and N122 from the Shau Kei Wan Bus Terminus at Nam On Street. Other bus lines include: 2A, 14, 81, 81A, 82, 82X, 85, 106, 606, 606A, 606X, 682, 682A, 682B, 682P, 694, 722, N8 and N8X. Passengers can also travel to the Hong Kong International Airport via route A12.

=== Mini-bus ===
There are several green mini-buses that have their terminus at Po Man Street in Shau Kei Wan. These include 32 and 57M. Other minibus services include Routes 50, 65, and 66 and also:

- Route 20 to Chai Wan
- Route 32 to Kornhill
- Route 50 to Sai Wan Ho
- Route 66 to Chai Wan
- Route 68 to Quarry Bay

Passengers can also easily board red mini-buses in Shau Kei Wan, which bring them to places such as Wan Chai, Chai Wan and Causeway Bay. Overnight minibuses are also available to Mong Kok, To Kwa Wan, Kwun Tong, Sai Wan and Kennedy Town.

=== Boat ===
There are boat service at Saturday 9 am, 10am, 11am, going to Tung Lung Chau; a popular hiking site.

=== Major Thoroughfares, Roads and Streets ===
- A Kung Ngam Road
- A Kung Ngam Village Road
- Aldrich Bay Road
- Aldrich Street
- Basel Road
- Church Street
- Factory Street
- Kam Wa Street
- Miu Tung Street
- Mong Lung Street
- Oi Kan Road
- Oi Yin Street
- Shau Kei Wan Main Street East
- Shau Kei Wan Road
- Tam Kung Temple Road
- Tung Hei Road
- Yiu Hing Road

== Education ==
=== Primary and secondary schools ===
A number of schools including both primary and secondary schools can be found in Shau Kei Wan.

Secondary Schools (in alphabetical order):

- Carmel School Association Elsa High School (Private Jewish high school)
- Hong Kong Chinese Women's Club College (香港中國婦女會中學)
- Munsang College (Hong Kong Island) (港島民生書院)
- Salesian English School (Secondary Section) (慈幼中學)
- Shau Kei Wan East Government Secondary School (筲箕灣東官立中學)
- Shau Kei Wan Government Secondary School (筲箕灣官立中學)
- St. Mark's School (Hong Kong) (聖馬可中學)

Primary Schools (in alphabetical order):

- Aldrich Bay Government Primary School (愛秩序灣官立小學)
- CCC Kei Wan Primary School (中華基督教會基灣小學)
- CCC Kei Wan Primary School (Aldrich Bay) (中華基督教會基灣小學(愛蝶灣))
- END Leung Lee Sau Yu Memorial Primary School, The AM (勵志會梁李秀娛紀念上午小學)
- END Leung Lee Sau Yu Memorial Primary School, The PM (勵志會梁李秀娛紀念下午小學)
- Salesian School (慈幼學校)
- Shau Kei Wan Government Primary School (筲箕灣官立小學)
- Shaukiwan Tsung Tsin School (筲箕灣崇真學校)
- St. Mark's Primary School (聖馬可小學)
- The Endeavourers Leung Lee Sau Yu Memorial Primary School
- The HKCWC Hioe Tjo Yoeng Primary School (香港中國婦女會丘佐榮學校)

Shau Kei Wan is in Primary One Admission (POA) School Net 16. Within the school net are multiple aided schools (operated independently but funded with government money) and two government schools: Shau Kei Wan Government Primary School and Aldrich Bay Government Primary School.

Former schools:

- Kellett School Shau Kei Wan campus

=== Public libraries ===
The Yiu Tung Public Library, located in Yiu Tung Estate and operated by Hong Kong Public Libraries, provides a place for people to read and borrow books and other publications.

== Climate ==
Climate data for Shau Kei Wan (2008–2020)
Month	Jan	Feb	Mar	Apr	May	Jun	Jul	Aug	Sep	Oct	Nov	Dec	Year
Mean daily maximum °C (°F)	18.4 (65.1)	18.9 (66.0)	21.0 (69.8)	24.5 (76.1)	28.1 (82.6)	30.6 (87.1)	31.5 (88.7)	31.6 (88.9)	30.6 (87.1)	27.9 (82.2)	24.6 (76.3)	20.4 (68.7)	25.7 (78.2)
Daily mean °C (°F)	15.8 (60.4)	16.2 (61.2)	18.6 (65.5)	22.1 (71.8)	25.7 (78.3)	28.0 (82.4)	28.6 (83.5)	28.6 (83.5)	28.0 (82.4)	25.3 (77.5)	21.8 (71.2)	17.5 (63.5)	23.0 (73.4)
Mean daily minimum °C (°F)	13.8 (56.8)	14.3 (57.7)	16.7 (62.1)	20.1 (68.2)	23.7 (74.7)	25.9 (78.6)	26.3 (79.3)	26.1 (79.0)	25.7 (78.3)	23.4 (74.1)	19.9 (67.8)	15.3 (59.5)	20.9 (69.7)
Average precipitation mm (inches)	35.7 (1.41)	34.8 (1.37)	80.0 (3.15)	129.9 (5.11)	325.0 (12.80)	462.7 (18.22)	325.8 (12.83)	326.3 (12.85)	262.9 (10.35)	105.0 (4.13)	48.3 (1.90)	28.0 (1.10)	2,164.4 (85.22)
Source: Hong Kong Observatory

== See also ==
- List of places in Hong Kong
- Public housing estates in Shau Kei Wan
