= Public housing estates in Shau Kei Wan =

Public housing in Shau Kei Wan, Hong Kong

The following is a list of public housing estates in Shau Kei Wan, Hong Kong, including Home Ownership Scheme (HOS), Private Sector Participation Scheme (PSPS), Sandwich Class Housing Scheme (SCHS), Flat-for-Sale Scheme (FFSS), and Tenants Purchase Scheme (TPS) estates.

== Overview ==
Name		Type	Inaug.	No Blocks	No Units	Notes
Aldrich Garden	愛蝶灣	PSPS	2001	10	2,972	
Hing Tung Estate	興東邨	Public	1996	4	2,151	
Hong Tung Estate	康東邨	Public	1998	1	475	
Oi Tung Estate	愛東邨	Public	2001	6	3,207	
Yiu Tung Estate	耀東邨	Public	1997	11	5,305	
Ming Wah Dai Ha	明華大廈	Public	1962, 1963, 1965, 1978; 2019, 2024, 2034 after reconstruction	13	3,169	HK Housing Society
Tung Chun Court	東駿苑	HOS	1994	2	1,216	
Tung Hei Court	東熹苑	HOS	1995	4	2,432	
Tung Lam Court	東霖苑	HOS	1997	1	697	
Tung Shing Court	東盛苑	HOS	2000	1	370	
Tung Tao Court	東濤苑	HOS	2005	4	1,216	
Tung Yan Court	東欣苑	HOS	1998, 1999	2	1,050	
Tung Yuk Court	東旭苑	HOS	2001	5	1,600	

== Aldrich Garden ==
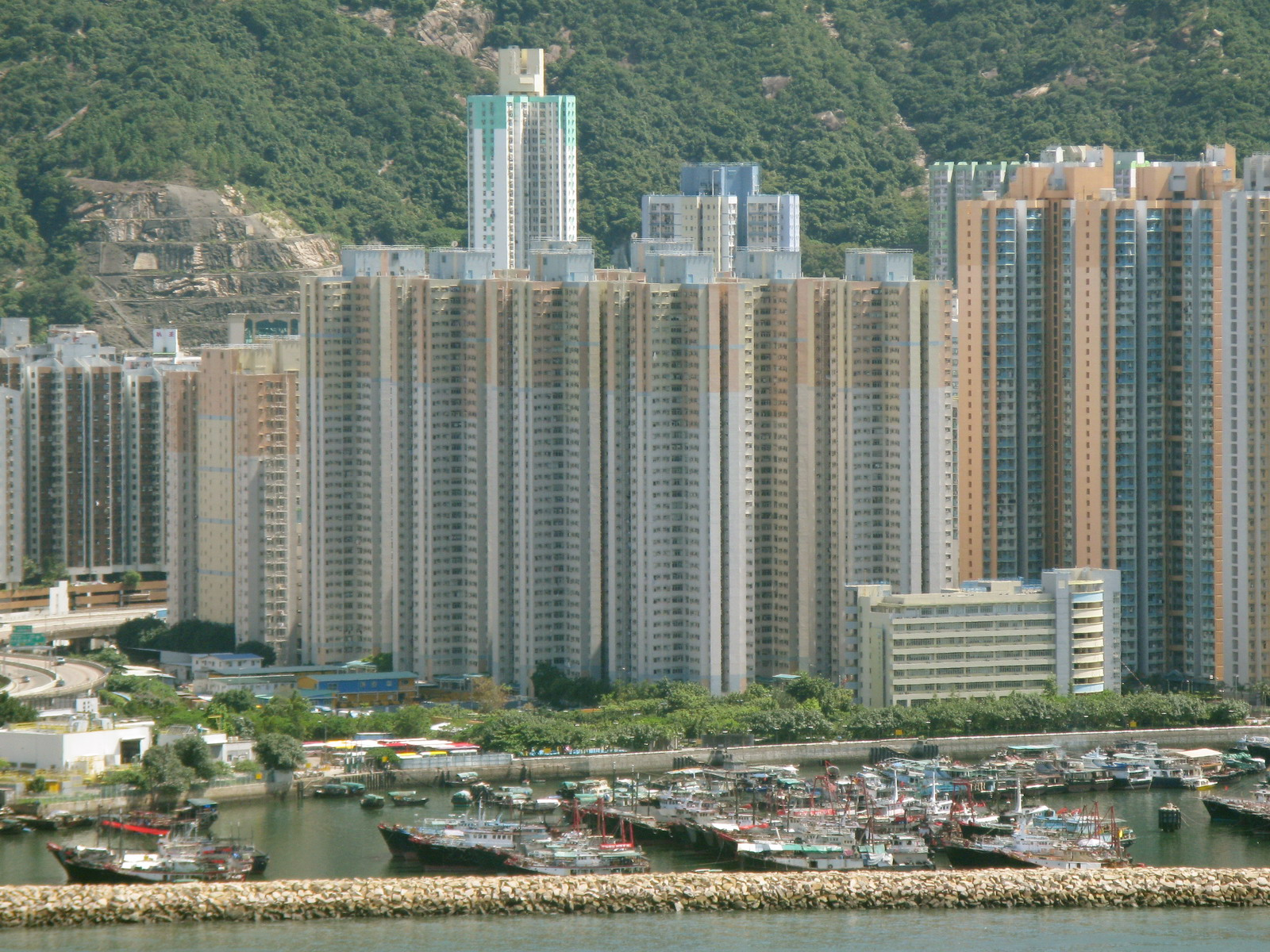
Aldrich Garden, with Shau Kei Wan Typhoon Shelter in the foreground.

Aldrich Garden (Chinese: 愛蝶灣) is a Home Ownership Scheme and a Private Sector Participation Scheme estate in the reclaimed land of Aldrich Bay, Shau Kei Wan, Hong Kong. It was completed in 2001, which consists of 10 residential buildings that offer a total of 2,972 flats. Gross floor area and saleable area ranging from 46 to 71 square metres and 40 to 55 square metres respectively.

=== Houses ===
Name	Type	Completion
Block 1	Private Sector Participation Scheme	2001
Block 2	Private Sector Participation Scheme	2001
Block 3	Private Sector Participation Scheme	2001
Block 4	Private Sector Participation Scheme	2001
Block 5	Private Sector Participation Scheme	2001
Block 6	Private Sector Participation Scheme	2001
Block 7	Private Sector Participation Scheme	2001
Block 8	Private Sector Participation Scheme	2001
Block 9	Private Sector Participation Scheme	2001
Block 10	Private Sector Participation Scheme	2001

== Hing Tung Estate ==
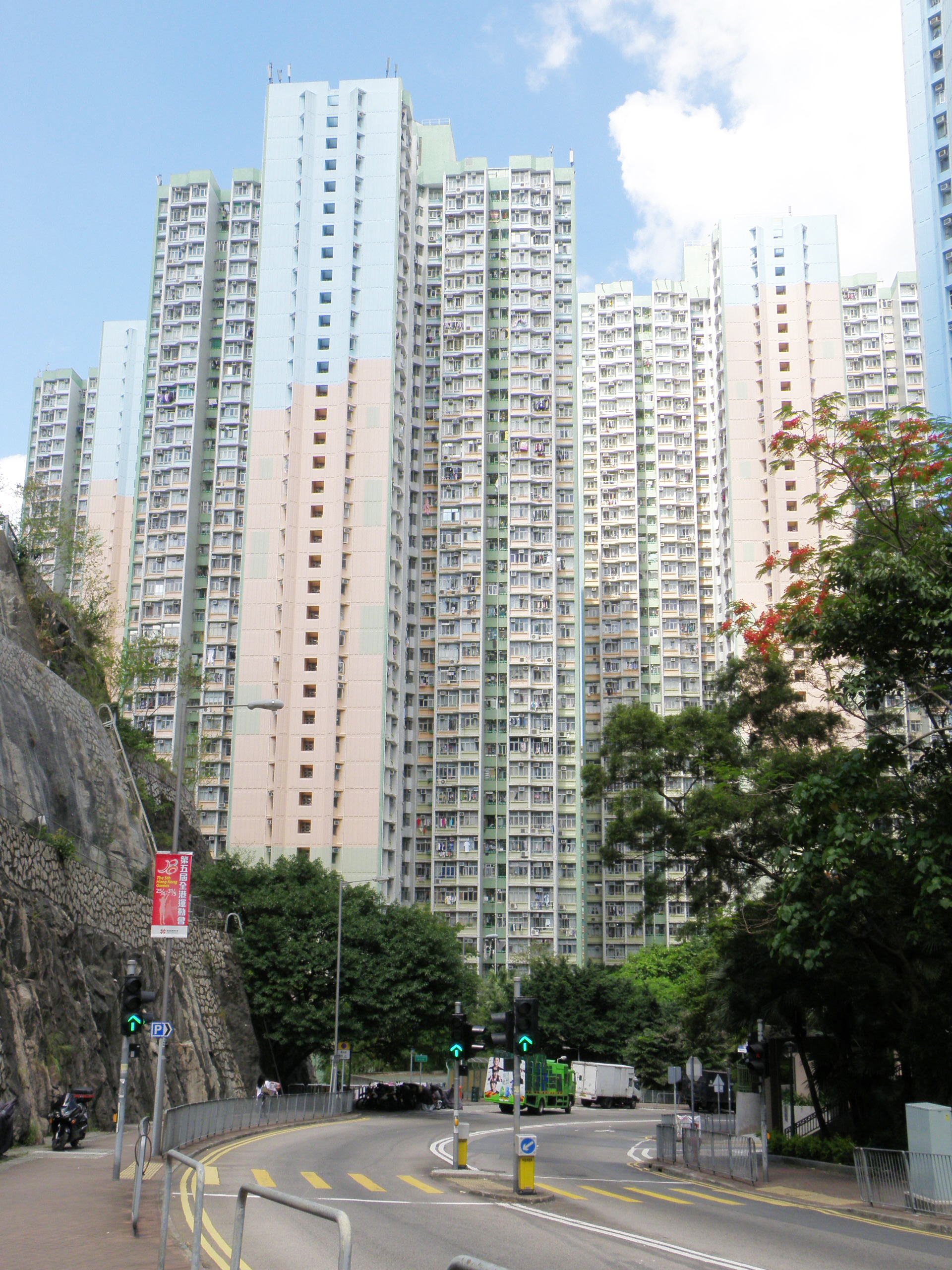
Hing Tung Estate

Hing Tung Estate (Chinese: 興東邨) is located in a former squatter areas at a hill in Southwest Shau Kei Wan, the estate consists of 3 rental buildings and 1 HOS building, Tung Lam Court (Chinese: 東霖苑), a Housing for Senior Citizens. They were completed in 1996 and 1997 respectively.

=== Houses ===
Name	Type	Completion
Hing Cho House	Harmony 1	1996
Hing Fung House	Harmony 1	1996
Hing Hong House	Harmony 1	1996
Tung Lam Court (Housing for Senior Citizens)	Harmony 1	1997

== Hong Tung Estate ==
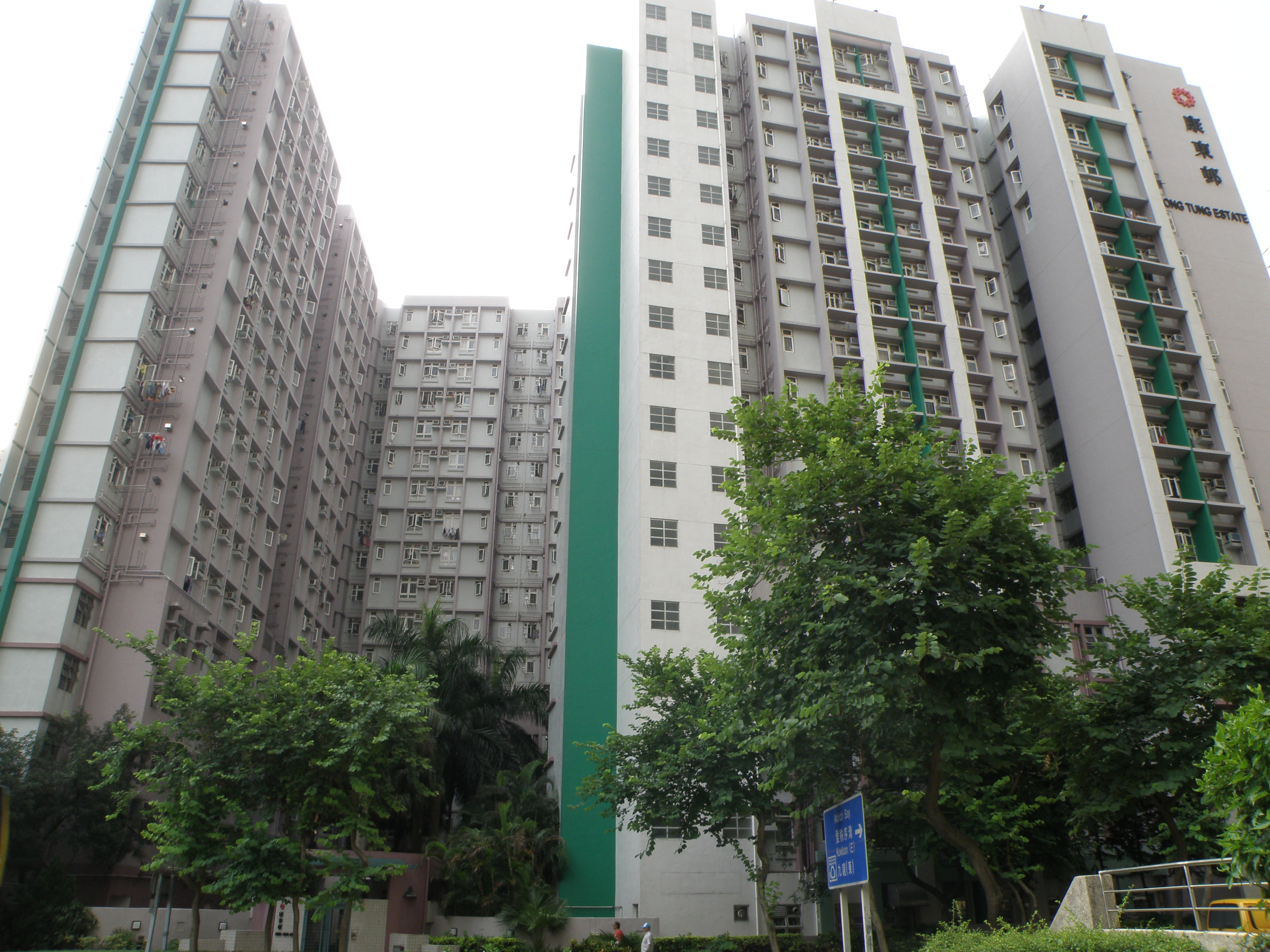
Hong Tung Estate

Hong Tung Estate (Chinese: 康東邨) was built on reclaimed land of the north of Island Eastern Corridor and near Lei King Wan and Tsui Woo Terrace, Tai Koo Shing.

The estate has 1 residential building with about 500 flats. Some of the flats are offered to senior citizen tenants.

Hong Tung Estate is in Primary One Admission (POA) School Net 14. Within the school net are multiple aided schools (operated independently but funded with government money) and North Point Government Primary School.

=== Houses ===
Name	Type	Completion
Hong Shui House	Small Household Block	1998

== Oi Tung Estate ==
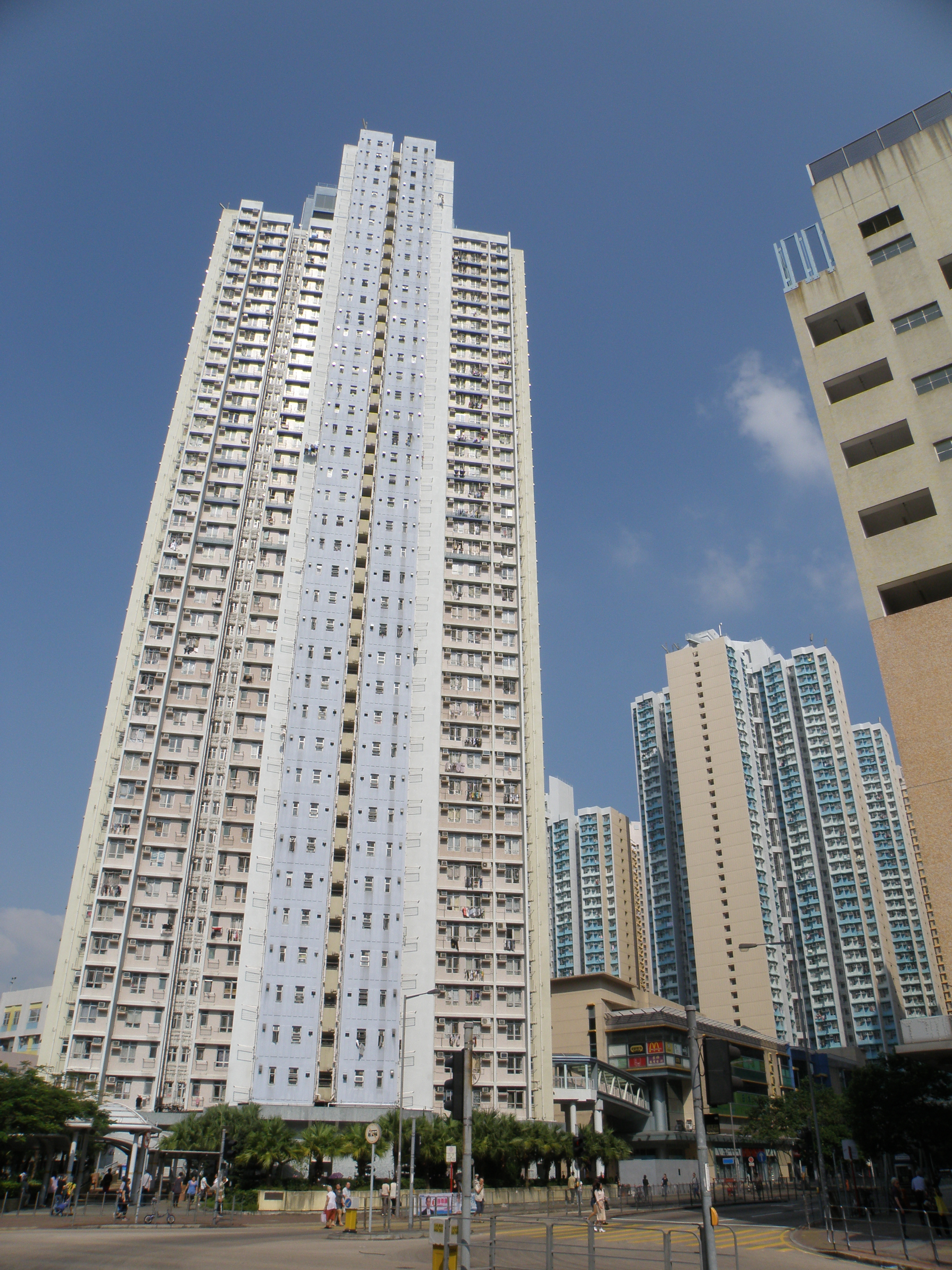
Oi Tung Estate

Oi Tung Estate (Chinese: 愛東邨) was built on reclaimed land of Aldrich Bay, Shau Kei Wan, Hong Kong, with Tung Yuk Court and Aldrich Garden, two Home Ownership Scheme courts. It consists of 6 residential blocks completed, providing a total of 3,900 flats.

=== Houses ===
Name	Type	Completion
Oi Chak House	Harmony 1	2001
Oi Ping House	Harmony 1	2001
Oi Yuk House	Harmony 1	2001
Oi Sin House	Small Household Block	2001
Oi Po House	Small Household Block	2003
Oi Yat House	Non Standard	2008

== Yiu Tung Estate ==
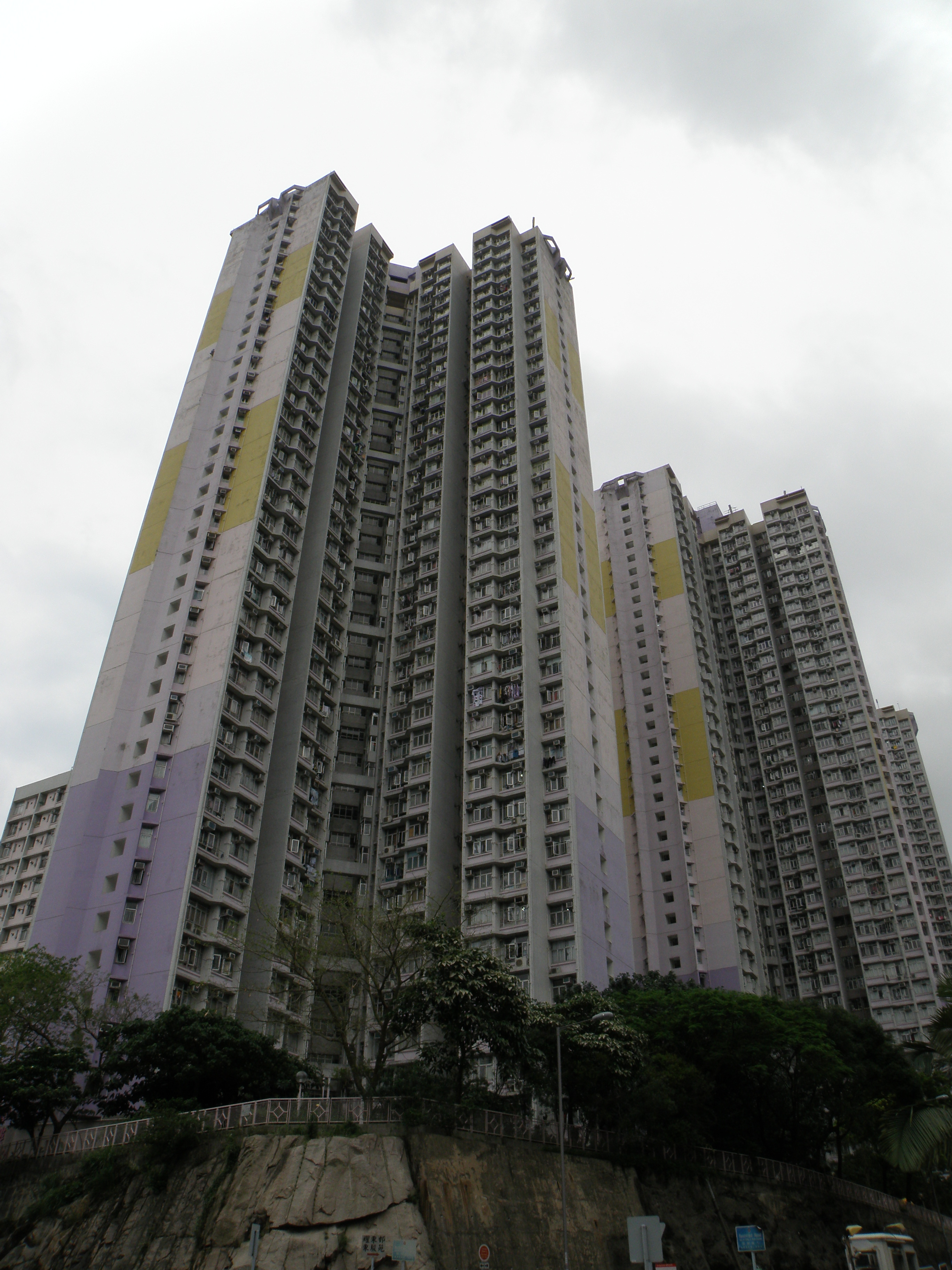
Yiu Tung Estate

Yiu Tung Estate (Chinese: 耀東邨) was constructed in a former squatter areas at a hill in Southwest Shau Kei Wan, the estate consists of 11 residential buildings built in 1994 and 1995 respectively. The Yiu Tung Public Library is located within the estate.

=== Houses ===
Name	Type	Completion
Yiu Lok House	Harmony 1	1994
Yiu Fook House	Harmony 1	1994
Yiu Fu House	Harmony 1	1994
Yiu Wah House	Harmony 1	1994
Yiu Fung House	Harmony 3	1994
Yiu On House	Harmony 3	1994
Yiu Kwai House	Harmony 3	1995
Yiu Cheong House	Harmony 3	1995
Yiu Hing House	Harmony 3	1995
Yiu Fai House	Harmony 3	1995
Yiu Ming House	Harmony 3	1995

== Ming Wah Dai Ha ==
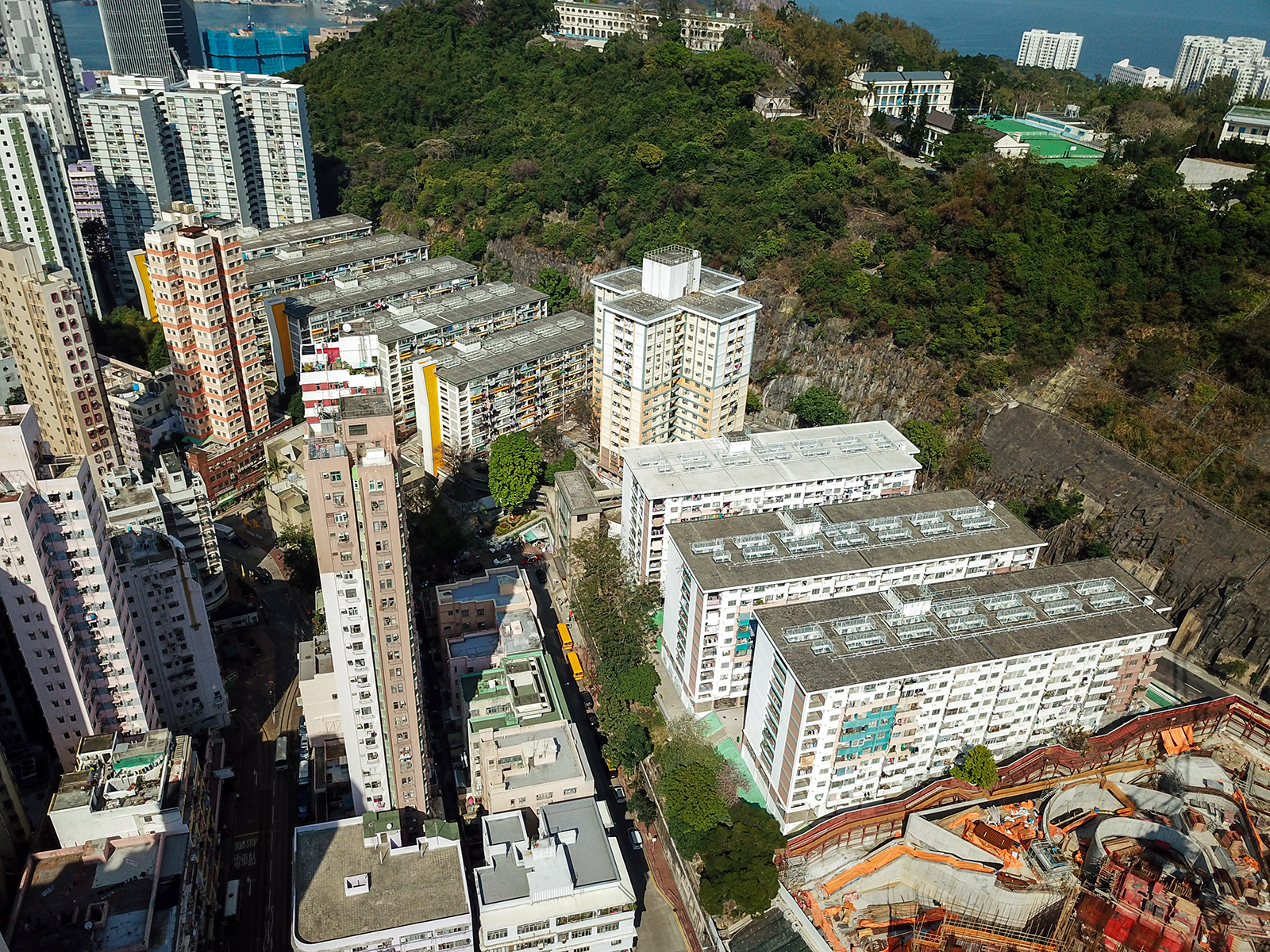
Aerial view of Ming Wah Dai Ha

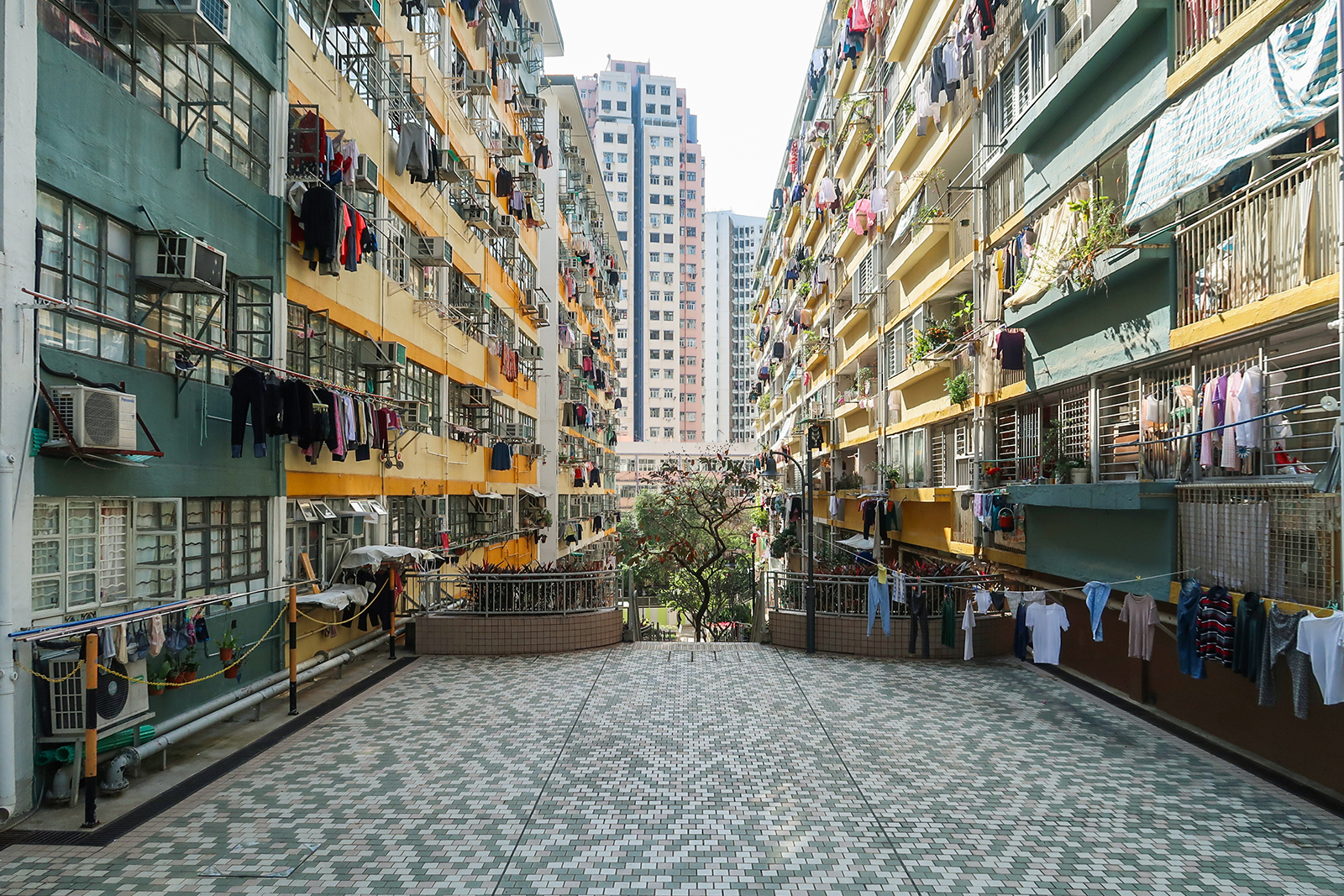
Ming Wah Dai Ha Block B & C Open space

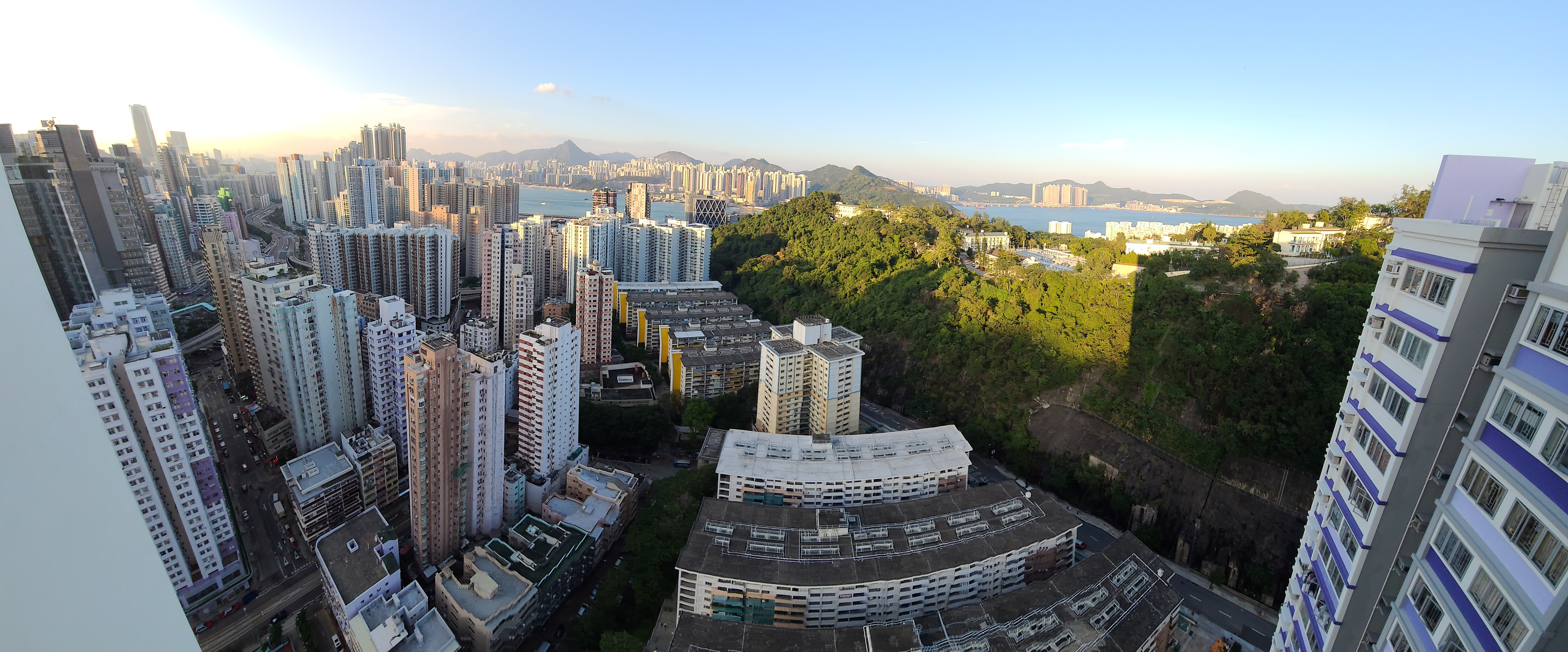
Looking North from Block 2

Ming Wah Dai Ha (Chinese: 明華大廈) comprises 13 residential blocks completed between 1962 and 1978. It is the oldest existing public housing estate developed by the Hong Kong Housing Society. It was named for Bishop Ronald Owen Hall, one of the founders of Hong Kong Housing Society. Block A was built in 1965 and redeveloped in 1978 and Block 1 (30 stories) and Block 2 (31 stories) were redeveloped in 2021.

Notable former residents include Aaron Kwok.

=== Houses ===
Name	Type	Completion
Block A	Non-standard	1978
Block B	Slab	1965–1966
Block C	Slab	1965–1966
Block D	Slab	1965–1966
Block E	Slab	1965–1966
Block F	Slab	1965–1966
Block G	Cruciform	1962
Block H	Slab	1963
Block I	Slab	1963
Block J	Slab	1962
Block K	Slab	1962
Block L	Slab	1962
Block M	Slab	1962
Block 1	Y Central Corridor	2021
Block 2	Y Central Corridor	2021

== Tung Chun Court ==
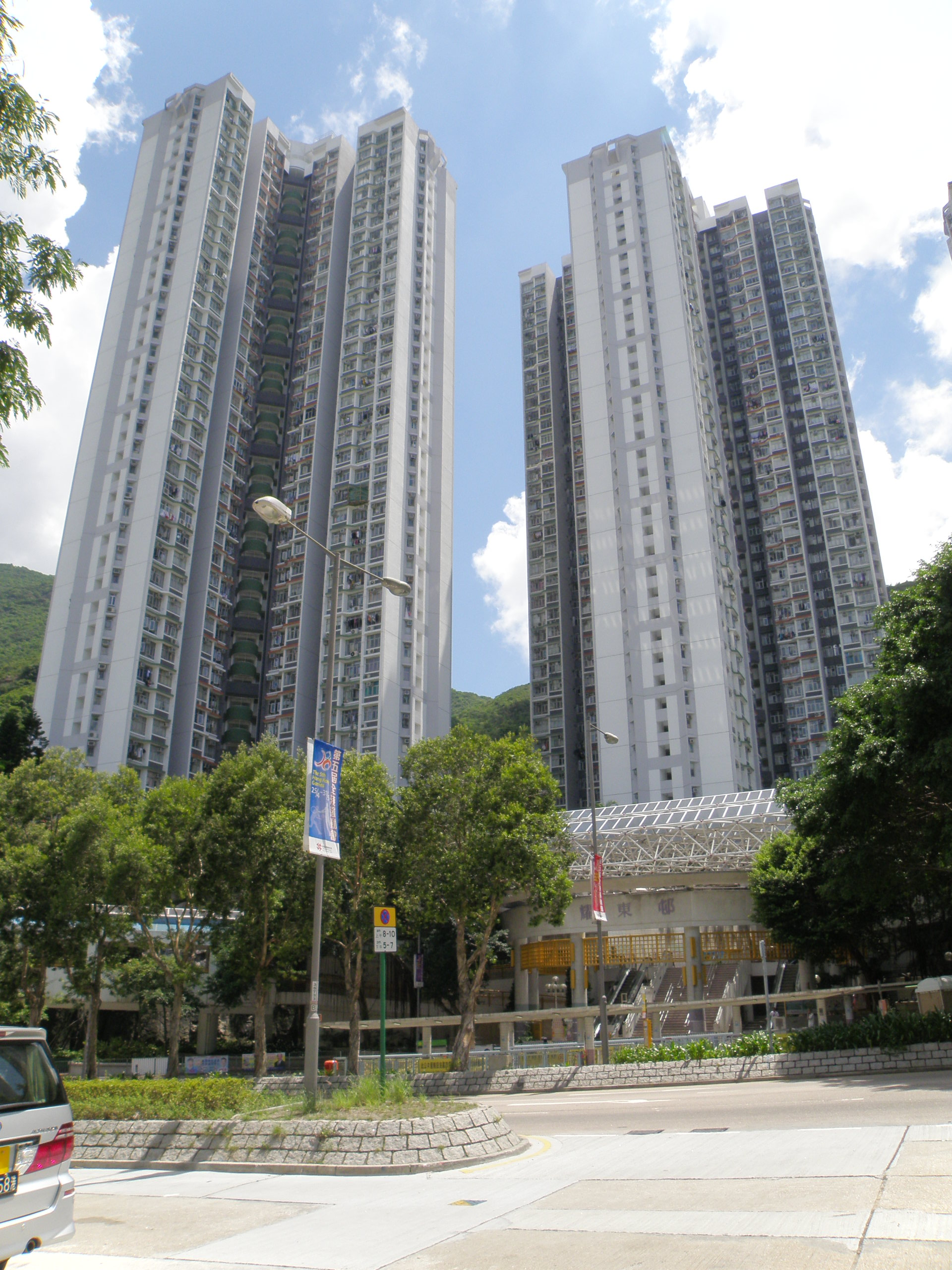
Tung Chun Court

Tung Chun Court (Chinese: 東駿苑) is a Home Ownership Scheme court in a former squatter areas at a hill in Southwest Shau Kei Wan, near Yiu Tung Estate. It has two blocks completed in 1994.

=== Houses ===
Name	Type	Completion
Kam Chun House	Harmony 1	1994
Ngan Chun House	Harmony 1	1994

== Tung Hei Court ==
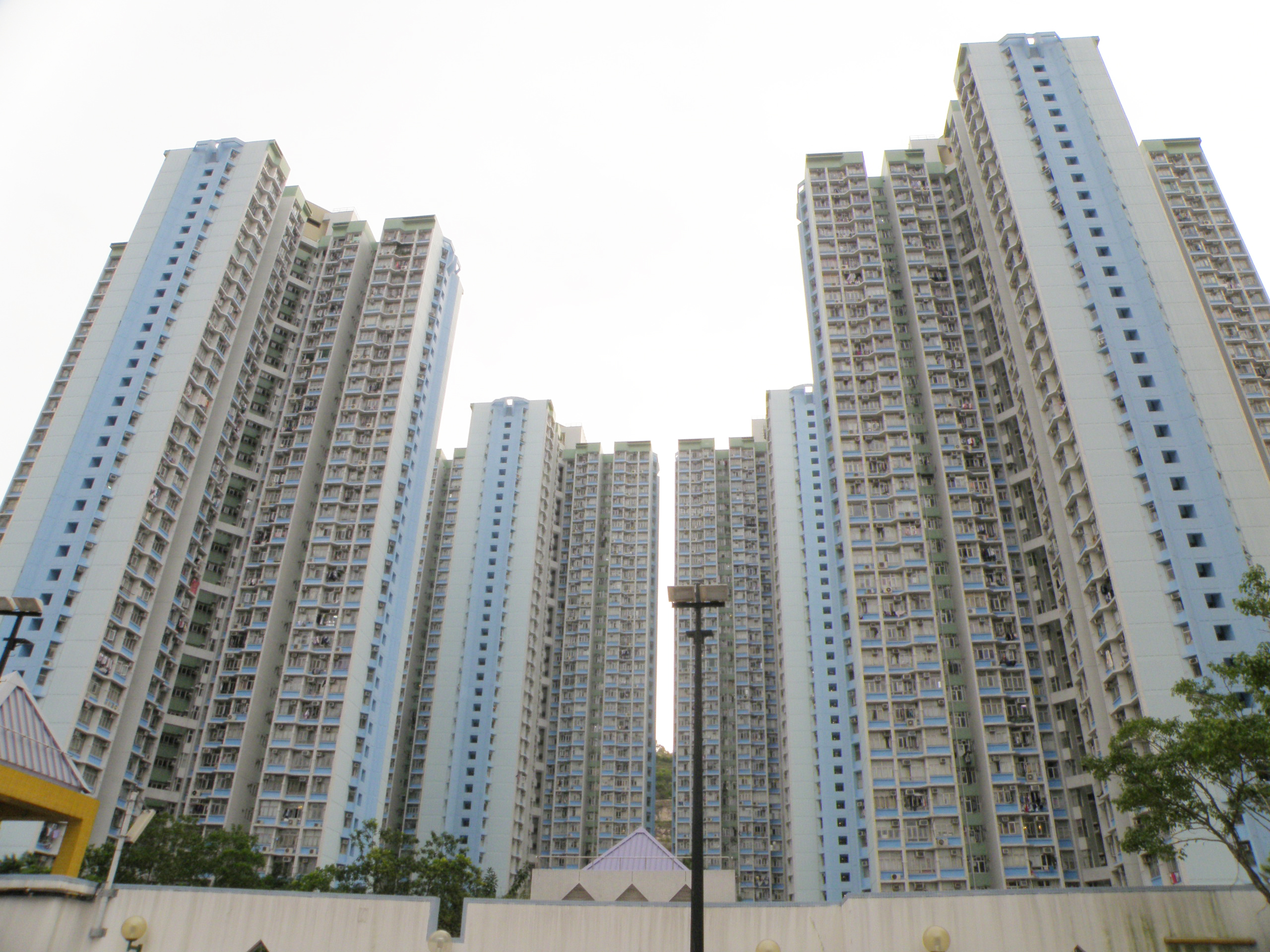
Tung Hei Court

Tung Hei Court (Chinese: 東熹苑) is a Home Ownership Scheme court in Shau Kei Wan, near Hing Tung Estate. It has totally 4 residential towers providing 2,432 domestic units, which were completed in 1995.

=== Houses ===
Name	Type	Completion
King Hei House	Harmony 1	1995
Yat Hei House	Harmony 1	1995
Wah Hei House	Harmony 1	1995
Yiu Hei House	Harmony 1	1995

== Tung Lam Court ==
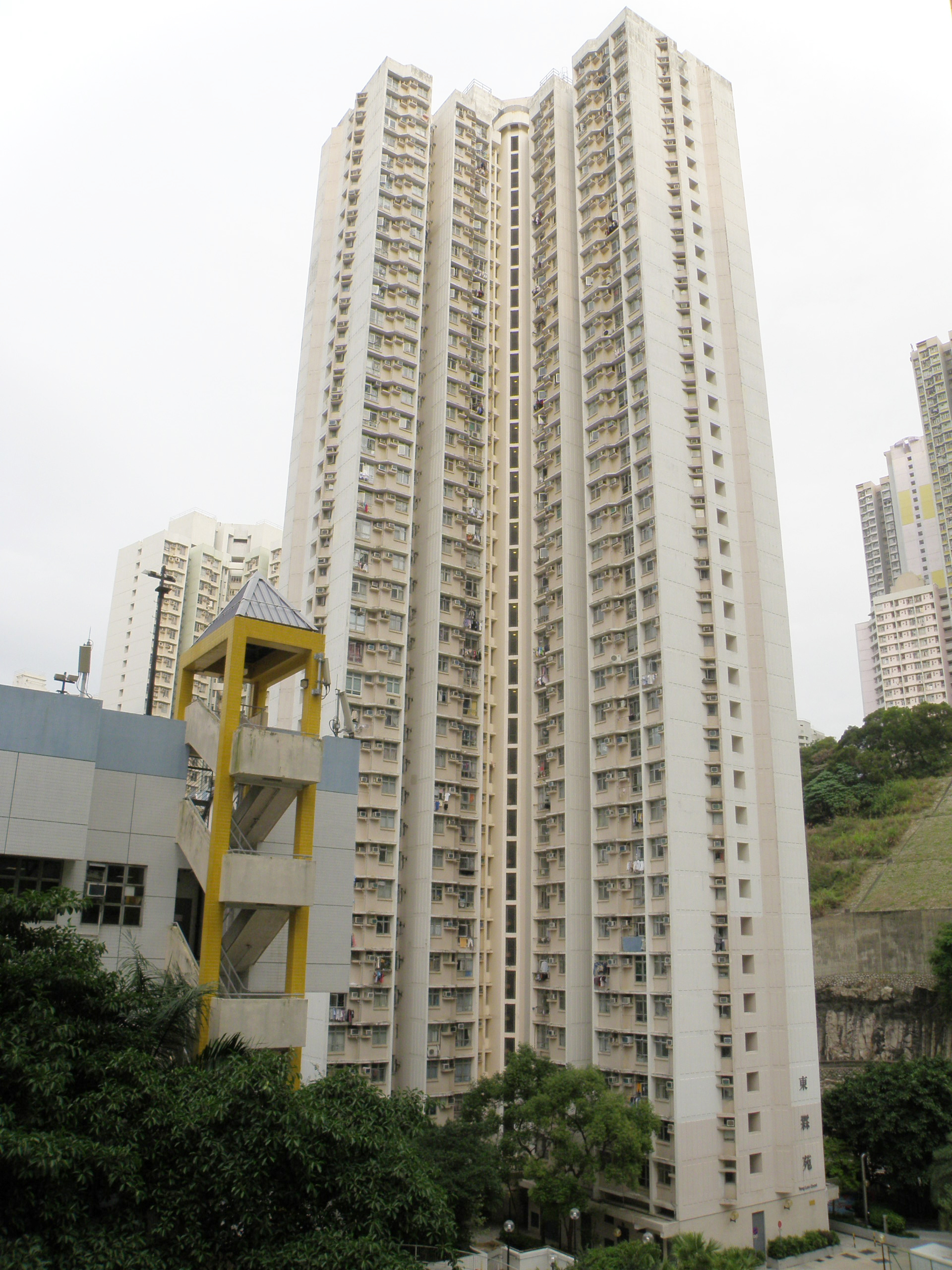
Tung Lam Court

Tung Lam Court (Chinese: 東霖苑) is a Home Ownership Scheme court in Shau Kei Wan near Hing Tung Estate. Formerly the site of squatter areas, the court has one block completed in 1997.

=== House ===
Name	Type	Completion
Tung Lam Court	Harmony 1	1997

== Tung Shing Court ==
Tung Shing Court (Chinese: 東盛苑) is a Home Ownership Scheme court in a former squatter areas at a hill in Southwest Shau Kei Wan, near Yiu Tung Estate. It has one block completed in 2000.

=== House ===
Name	Type	Completion
Tung Shing Court	New Cruciform (Ver.1984)	2000

== Tung Tao Court ==
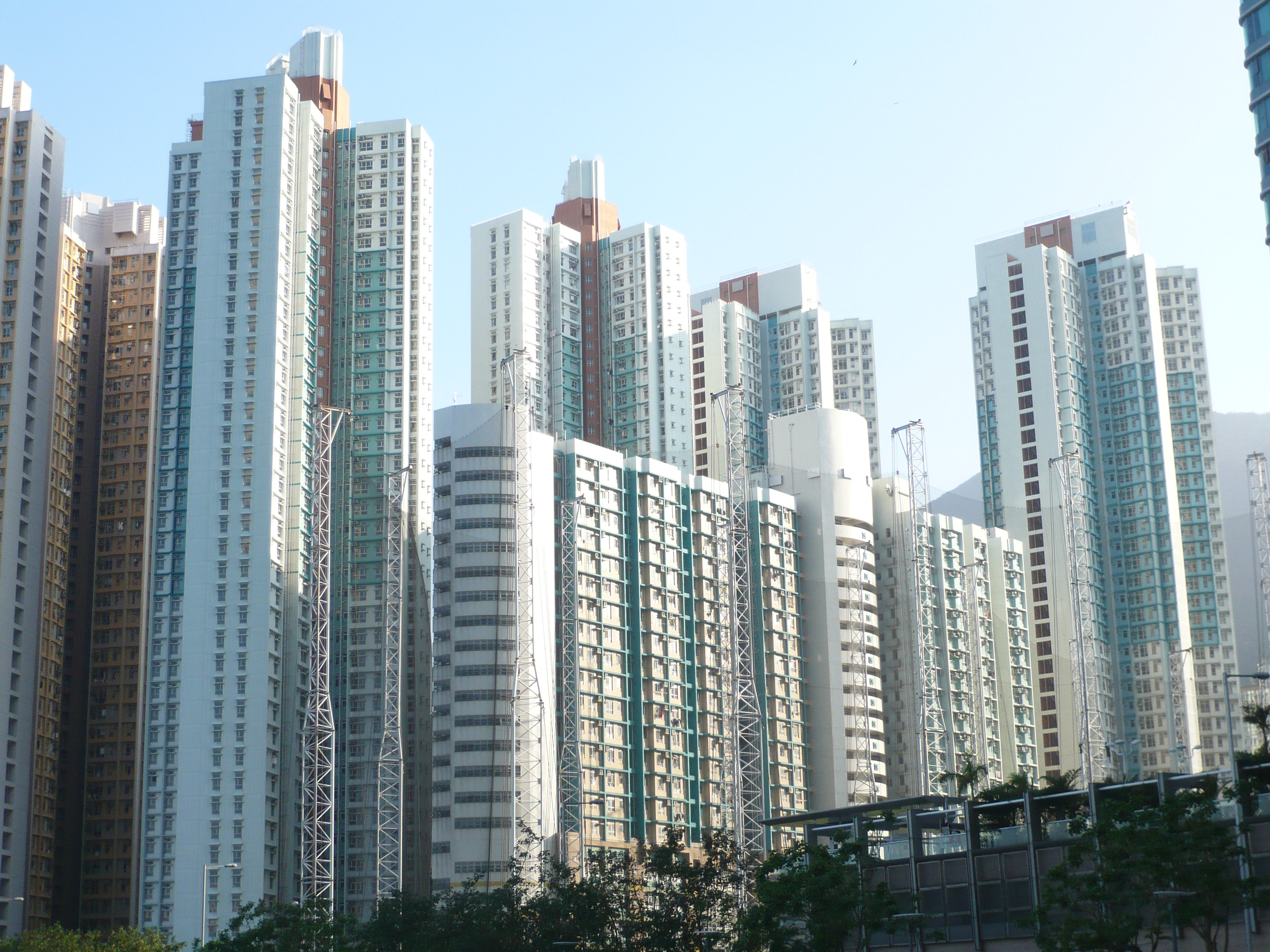
Tung Tao Court

Tung Tao Court (Chinese: 東濤苑) is a Home Ownership Scheme court on the waterfront of the reclaimed land of Aldrich Bay in Shau Kei Wan. It originally comprised 5 concord towers completed in 2005. Four of them are HOS blocks and were sold to public through the Sale of Surplus HOS Flats Phase 3 and 4 in 2008. One of them is public rental housing block. It was later reassigned to nearby Oi Tung Estate and renamed as "Oi Po House".

=== Houses ===
Name	Type	Completion
Hiu Tao House	New Cruciform (Ver.1999)	2005
Yuk Tao House	New Cruciform (Ver.1999)	2005
Fai Tao House	Single Aspect Concord	2005
Ying Tao House	Single Aspect Concord	2005

== Tung Yan Court ==
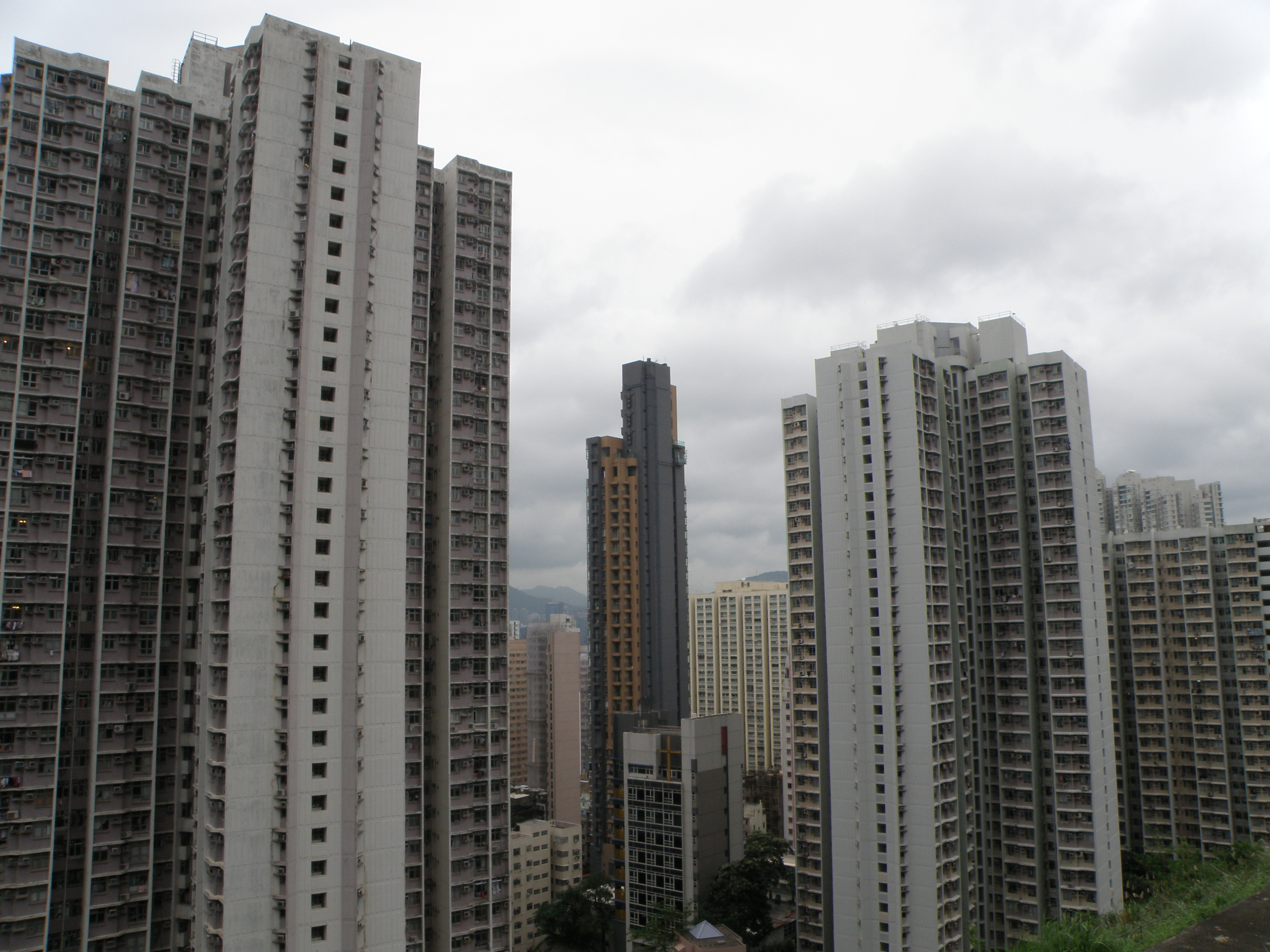
Tung Yan Court

Tung Yan Court (Chinese: 東欣苑) is a Home Ownership Scheme court in Shau Kei Wan. Formerly the site of squatter areas, the court consists of 2 blocks completed in 1998 and 1999.

=== Houses ===
Name	Type	Completion
Foon Yan Court	Harmony 1	1998, 1999
Wing Yan Court	Harmony 3	1998, 1999

== Tung Yuk Court ==
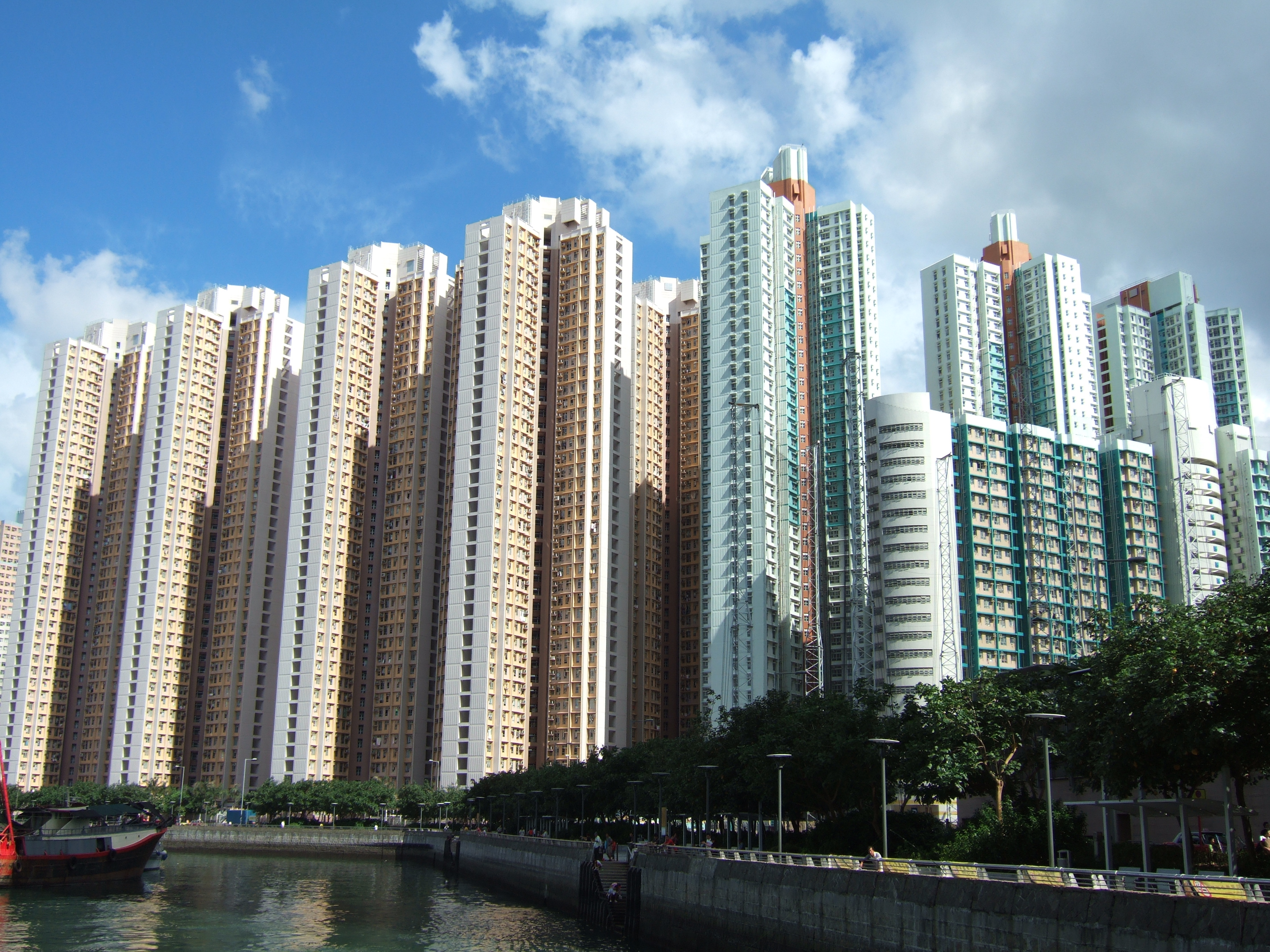
Tung Yuk Court (left) and Tung Tao Court (right)

Tung Yuk Court (Chinese: 東旭苑) is a Home Ownership Scheme court on the waterfront of the reclaimed land of Aldrich Bay in Shau Kei Wan. It comprises 5 concord towers with 1600 flats completed in 2001, and many units have full sea views over the harbour and Lei Yue Mun.

=== Houses ===
Name	Type	Completion
Tung King House	Concord 1	2001
Tung Chi House	Concord 1	2001
Tung Hiu House	Concord 1	2001
Tung Lai House	Concord 1	2001
Tung Ning House	Concord 1	2001

== See also ==
- Public housing in Hong Kong
- List of public housing estates in Hong Kong
