= Upper Yiu Tung (constituency) =

Hong Kong constituency

- 上耀東
- Elected constituency for the Eastern District Council
- Boundary of Upper Yiu Tung in Eastern District
- District: Eastern
- Legislative Council constituency: Hong Kong Island East
- Population: 13,149 (2019)
- Electorate: 9,479 (2019)

Current constituency
- Created: 1999
- Number of members: One
- Member: Chow Cheuk-ki (Democratic)

Upper Yiu Tung (Chinese: 上耀東) is one of the 35 constituencies in the Eastern District.

The constituency returns one district councillor to the Eastern District Council, with an election every four years. The seat is currently held by Chow Cheuk-ki.

Upper Yiu Tung has estimated population of 13,149.

== Councillors represented ==
Election	Member	Party
1999	Chiu Chi-keong	DAB
2011	Chiu Chi-keong	FTU
2019	Chow Cheuk-ki	Democratic

== Election results ==
=== 2010s ===
Eastern District Council Election, 2019: Upper Yiu Tung
Party	Candidate	Votes	%	±%
Democratic	Chow Cheuk-ki	3,492	52.78	
FTU	Ng Ching-ching	3,124	47.22	
Majority		368	5.56	
Turnout		6,646	70.14	
Democratic gain from FTU		Swing		
