= Hing Tung Estate =

Public housing estate in Sai Wan Ho, Hong Kong

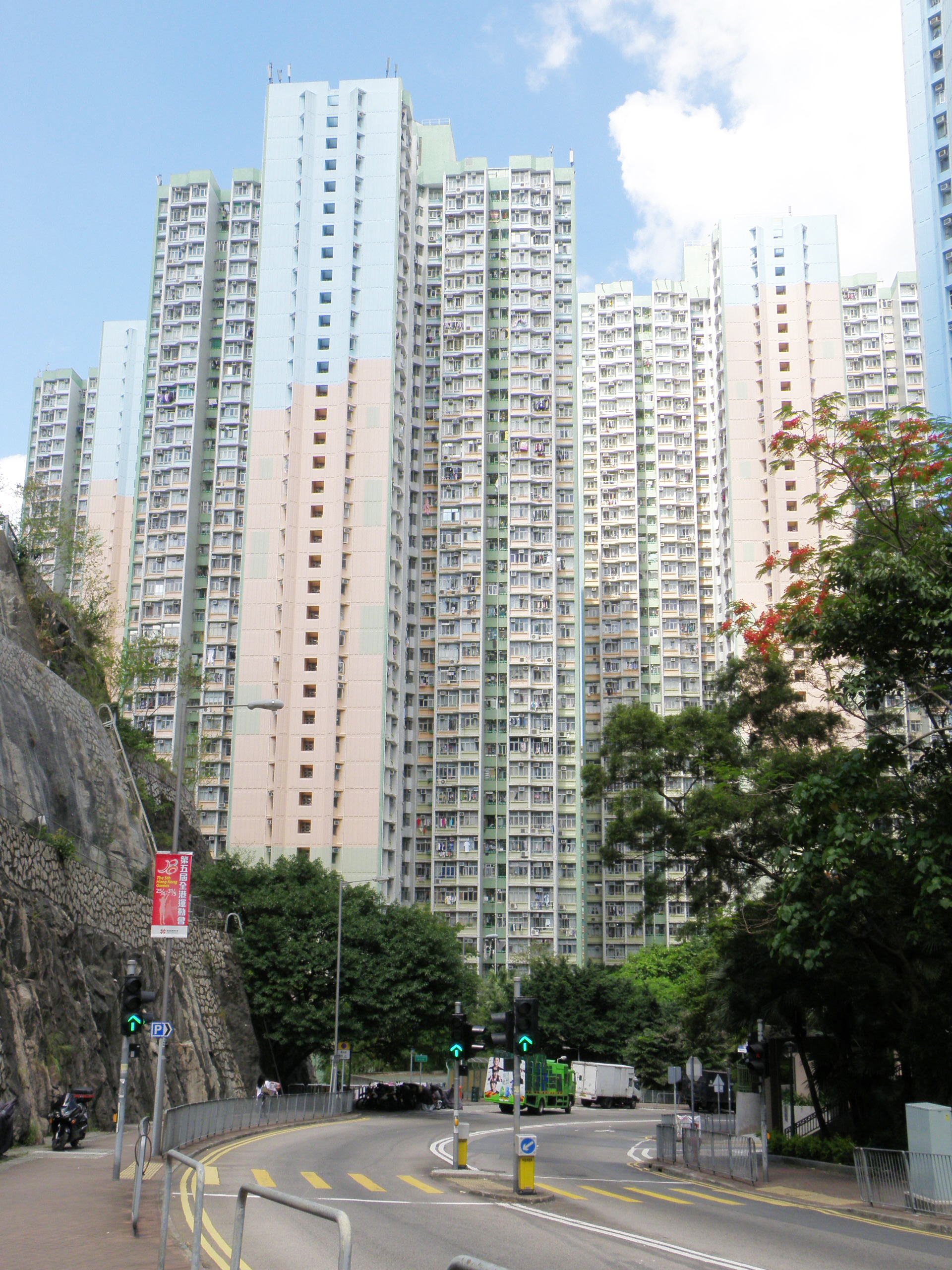
- Hing Tung Estate
- Interactive map of Hing Tung Estate

General information
- Location: 53 Yiu Hing Road, Sai Wan Ho; Hong Kong Island, Hong Kong
- Coordinates: 22.28167°N 114.21968°E
- Status: Completed
- Category: Public rental housing
- Population: 6,296 (2016)
- No. of blocks: 3
- No. of units: 2,151

Construction
- Constructed: 1996; 30 years ago
- Authority: Hong Kong Housing Authority

Hing Tung Estate (Chinese: 興東邨) is a public housing estate in Sai Wan Ho, Hong Kong Island, Hong Kong. The estate was constructed in a former squatter areas at a hill in Southwest Shau Kei Wan and consists of 3 residential buildings built in 1996.

Tung Hei Court (東熹苑), Tung Lam Court (東霖苑) and Tung Yan Court (東盛苑) are Home Ownership Scheme housing courts in a former squatter areas at a hill in Southwest Shau Kei Wan, near Hing Tung Estate, built between 1995 and 1998.

== Houses ==
=== Hing Tung Estate ===
Name	Chinese name	Building type	Completed
Hing Cho House	興祖樓	Harmony 1	1996
Hing Fung House	興豐樓	Harmony 1	1996
Hing Hong House	興康樓	Harmony 1	1996

=== Tung Hei Court ===
Name	Chinese name	Building type	Completed
King Hei House	景熹閣	Harmony 1	1995
Yat Hei House	逸熹閣	Harmony 1	1995
Wah Hei House	華熹閣	Harmony 1	1995
Yiu Hei House	耀熹閣	Harmony 1	1995

=== Tung Lam Court ===
Name	Chinese name	Building type	Completed
Tung Lam Court	東霖苑	Harmony 1	1997

=== Tung Yan Court ===
Name	Chinese name	Building type	Completed
Foon Yan House	歡欣閣	Harmony 1	1998
Wing Yan House	榮欣閣	Harmony 3	1998

== Demographics ==
According to the 2016 by-census, Hing Tung Estate had a population of 6,296 while Tung Hei Court had a population of 7,157. Altogether the population amounts to 13,453.

== Politics ==
Hing Tung Estate, Tung Hei Court, Tung Lam Court and Tung Yan Court are located in Hing Tung constituency of the Eastern District Council. It is currently represented by Cheung Chun-kit, who was elected in the 2019 elections.

== Education ==
Hing Tung Estate, Tung Hei Court, and Tung Lam Court are in Primary One Admission (POA) School Net 16. Within the school net are multiple aided schools (operated independently but funded with government money) and two government schools: Shau Kei Wan Government Primary School and Aldrich Bay Government Primary School.

== See also ==
- Public housing estates in Shau Kei Wan
