= Fortress Hill Methodist Secondary School =

School in Hong Kong

Coordinates: 22.2885°N 114.1958°E

- Traditional Chinese: 炮台山循道衞理中學
- Simplified Chinese: 炮台山循道卫理中学
Transcriptions
Standard Mandarin
- Hanyu Pinyin: Pàotái Shān xún dào Wèi lǐ Zhōngxué
Yue: Cantonese
- Jyutping: paau3 toi4 saan1 ceon4 dou6 wai6 lei5 zung1 hok6

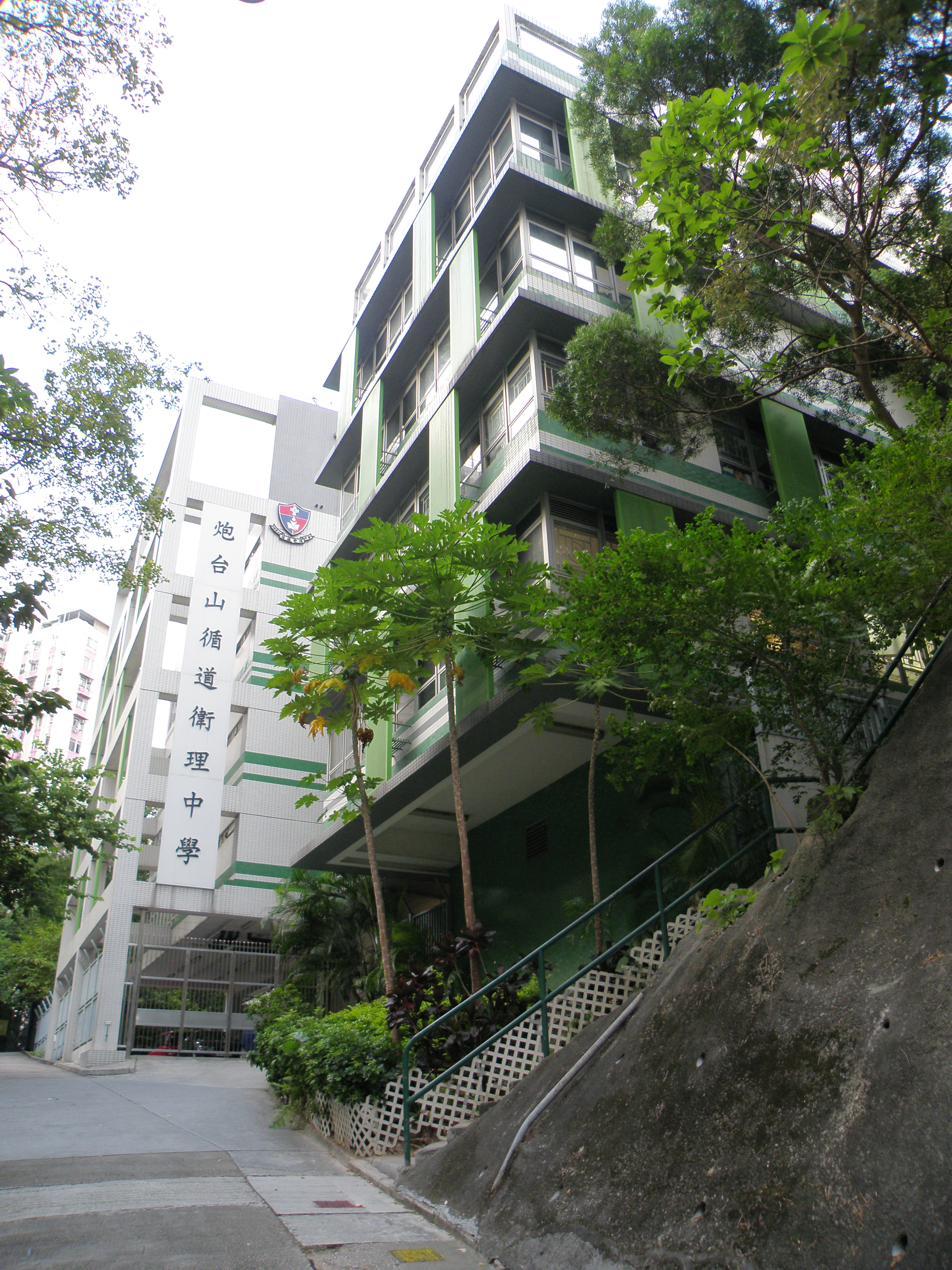
Fortress Hill Methodist Secondary School (brighter version)

Fortress Hill Methodist Secondary School (Chinese: 砲臺山循道衞理中學) is a school located in North Point, Hong Kong Island, Hong Kong. It is a secondary school serving students with learning difficulties.
