= Yiu Tung Public Library =

Public library in Hong Kong

Coordinates: 22.27686°N 114.22560°E

- 耀東公共圖書館
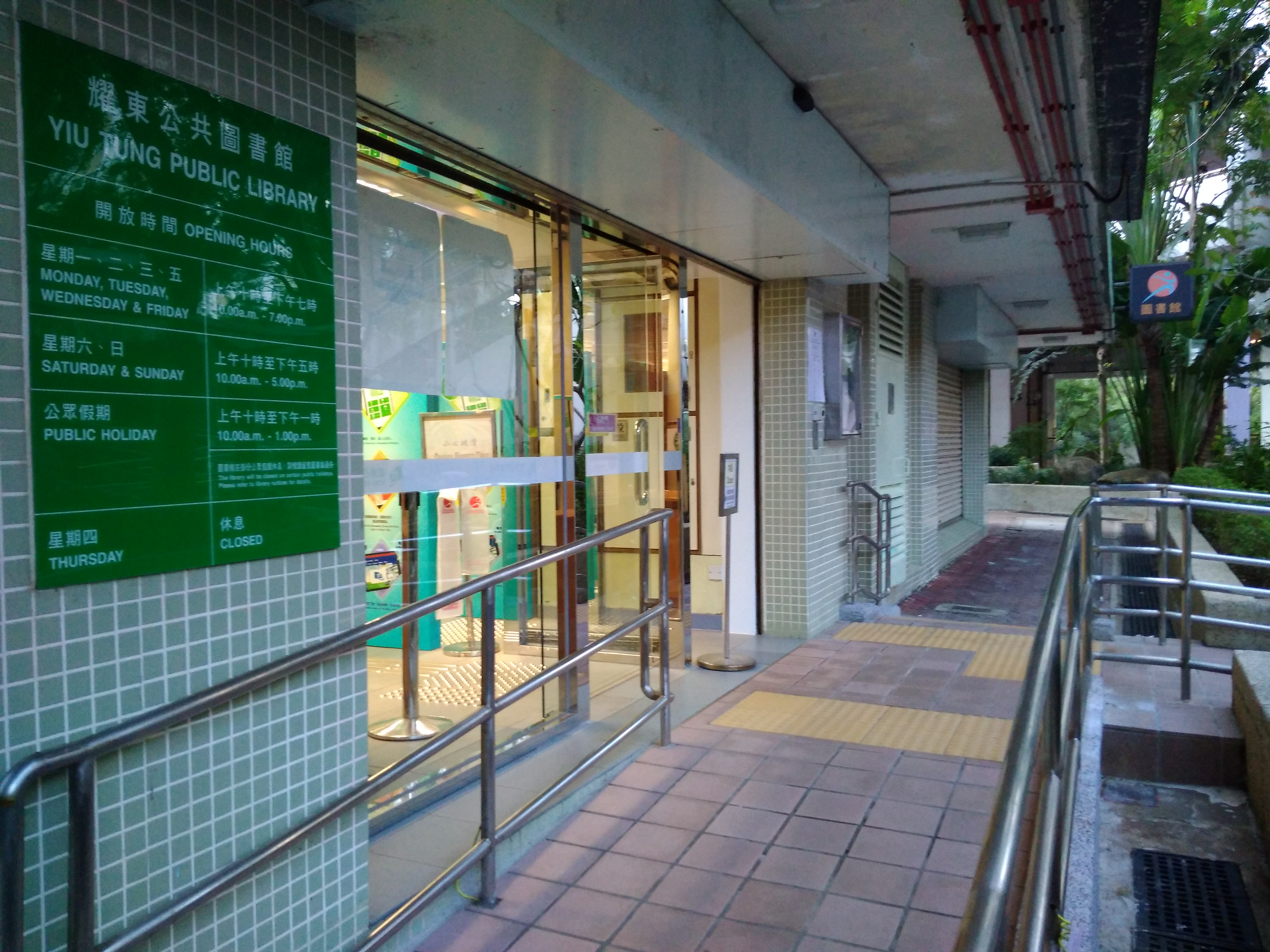
- Yiu Tung Public Library
- Location: G/F, Yiu Cheong House, Yiu Tung Estate, Shau Kei Wan, Hong Kong
- Type: Public

Other information
- Parent organisation: Leisure and Cultural Services Department
- Affiliation: Hong Kong Public Libraries
- Website: Official website

Yiu Tung Public Library
- Traditional Chinese: 耀東公共圖書館
- Simplified Chinese: 耀东公共图书馆
Transcriptions
Standard Mandarin
- Hanyu Pinyin: Yào Dōng Gōnggòng Túshūguǎn
Yue: Cantonese
- Yale Romanization: Yiuh dūng gūng guhng tòuh syū gún
- Jyutping: Jiu6 dung1 gung1 gung6 syu1 gun2

Yiu Tung Public Library is a public library, located in Yiu Tung Estate, Shau Kei Wan, Hong Kong. It is operated by Hong Kong Public Libraries.

== Facilities ==
Adult Lending Library
Junior Lending Library
Newspapers and Periodicals Section
Extension Activities Room
Services
Lending Service
Reservation and Inter-library Loan
Newspapers and Periodicals Service
Outreach Programmes

== See also ==
- List of buildings and structures in Hong Kong
- Hong Kong Public Libraries
