= Sai Wan Ho Civic Centre =

Coordinates: 22°16′55″N 114°13′21″E

- 西灣河文娛中心
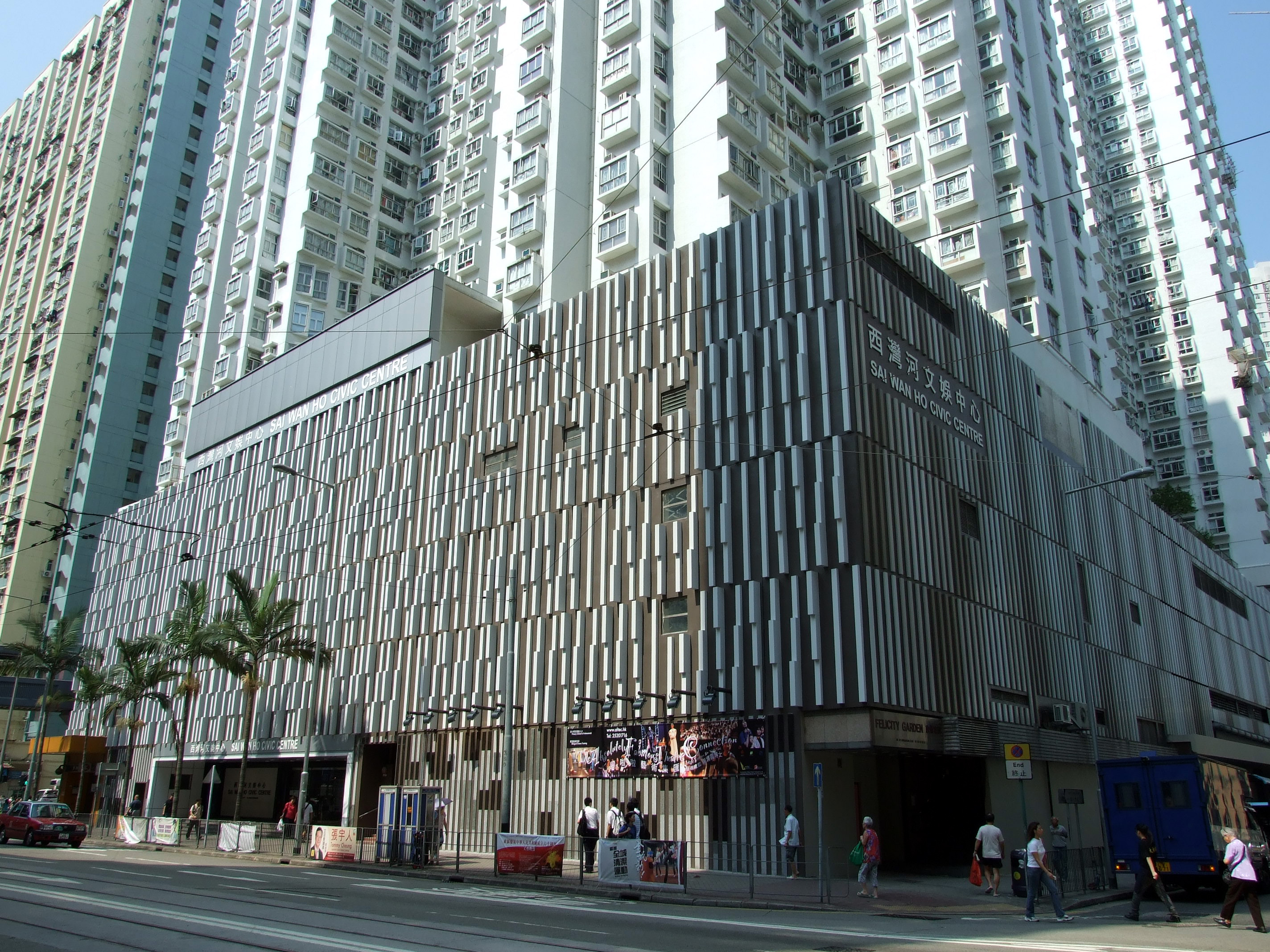
- Sai Wan Ho Civic Centre.
- Interactive map of the Sai Wan Ho Civic Centre area

General information
- Type: Community arts centre
- Location: Sai Wan Ho, Hong Kong Island, 111 Shau Kei Wan Road, Hong Kong
- Opened: 4 December 1990; 35 years ago
- Owner: Hong Kong Government
- Landlord: Leisure and Cultural Services Department

Website
- Official website

Sai Wan Ho Civic Centre
- Traditional Chinese: 西灣河文娛中心
Transcriptions
Yue: Cantonese
- Yale Romanization: Sāi wāan hó màhn yùh jūng sām
- Jyutping: Sai1 waan1 ho2 man4 jyu4 zung1 sam1

Sai Wan Ho Civic Centre is a community arts centre in Sai Wan Ho, Hong Kong Island, Hong Kong and maintained by the Leisure and Cultural Services Department, one of the successors to the territory's Urban Council. It was opened on 4 December 1990.

The 3-floor venue consists of:

- Cultural Activities Hall (seats 110)
- Music Practice Rooms - 2 rooms seating 20 each
- Theatre (1/F) - 471-seat auditorium with stage
- Art Studios - 2 rooms seating 20 and 30 people
- URBTIX Box Office

It is serviced by Sai Wan Ho station of the MTR Island line.

== See also ==
- Hong Kong City Hall
- Sha Tin Town Hall
- Tsuen Wan Town Hall
- Tuen Mun Town Hall
