= Grand Promenade =

Housing estate in Sai Wan Ho, Hong Kong

Coordinates: 22.28518°N 114.22473°E

- 嘉亨灣
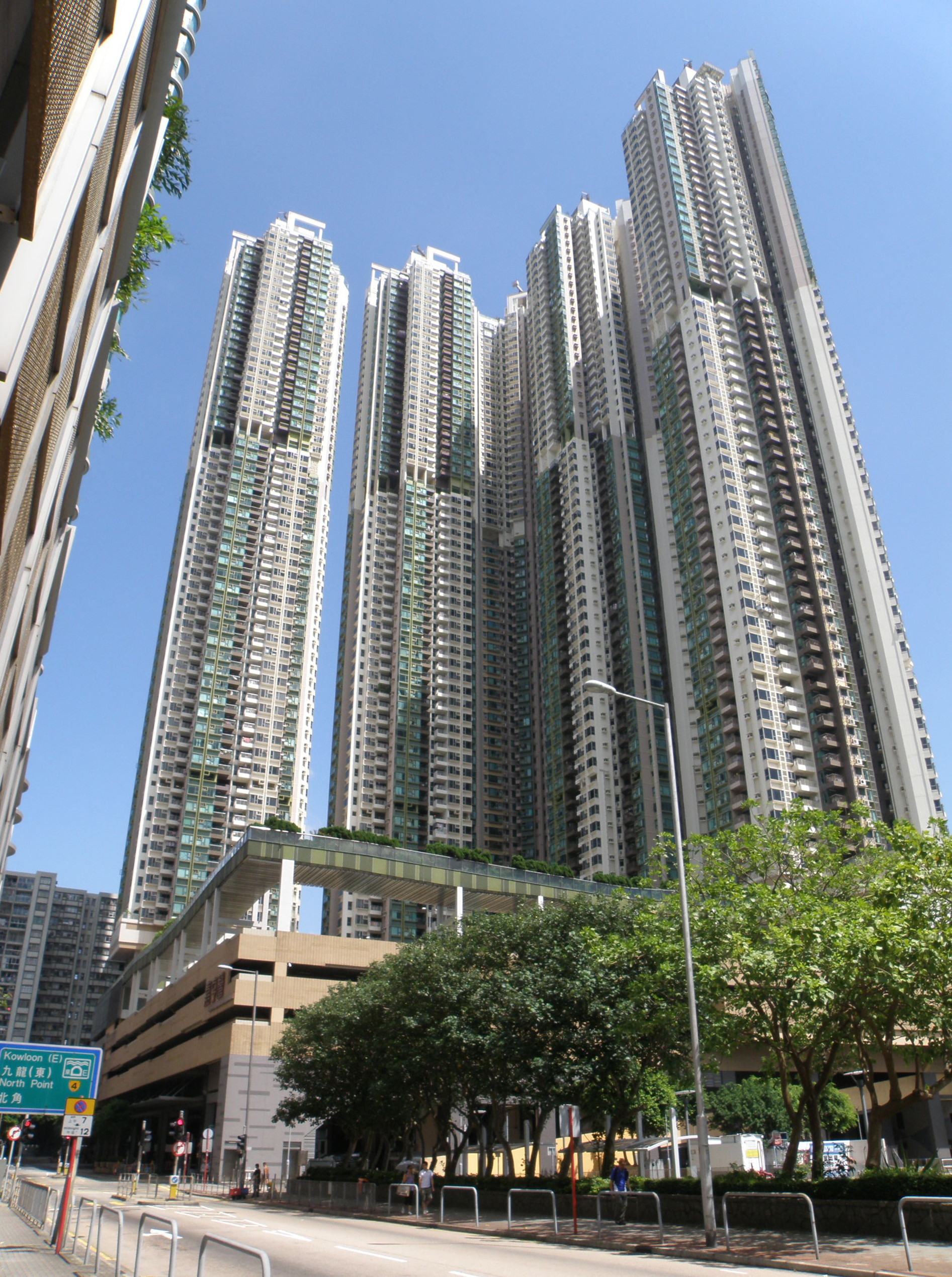
- Grand Promenade

General information
- Status: Completed
- Type: Residential
- Location: 38 Tai Hong Street, Sai Wan Ho, Hong Kong
- Opening: 2005; 21 years ago

Height
- Roof: 219 m (719 ft)

Technical details
- Floor count: 66

Design and construction
- Developer: Henderson Land Development, The Hongkong and Yaumati Ferry Co Ltd.

The Grand Promenade (simplified Chinese: 嘉亨湾; traditional Chinese: 嘉亨灣; Jyutping: ga^{1} hang^{1} waan^{1}) is a high-rise residential development located at 38 Tai Hong Street, Sai Wan Ho, Hong Kong Island, Hong Kong. It is developed by Henderson Land Development and its subsidiary, The Hongkong and Yaumati Ferry Co Ltd. in 2005.

Grand Promenade is built along the east coast of Hong Kong Island. The complex consists of 5 towers ((omitted tower 4) with towers 2, 3, and 5 being interconnected Grande Promenade provides 2,020 residential units. The saleable area of Grande Promenade ranges from 293 sq.ft. to 2,170 sq.ft. The towers are arranged in a way that most units have a panoramic view of Victoria Harbour, Lei Yue Mun, Tathong Channel, or Shaukeiwan Typhoon Shelter. There are clubhouses and swimming pools for residents of the estate. Grand Promenade is also a pet-friendly private housing estates on Hong Kong Island.

Grand Promenade is one of the 20 major housing estates in Hong Kong, and one of the constituent housing estates of the Centa-City Leading Index. According to the 2021 Population Census in Hong Kong, Grand Promenade's median monthly income from major occupations and median monthly household income are HKD45,000 (USD5,750) (ranking 14th in Hong Kong) and HKD67,300 (USD8,600) (ranking 37th in Hong Kong).

In terms of architecture, the 3 towers of Grand Promenade (Towers 2, 3 and 5) are 219 meters high, making them the 36th tallest buildings in Hong Kong. The other two buildings (Towers 1 and 6) are 209 meters high, making them the 63rd tallest buildings in Hong Kong. In addition, Grand Promenade is the tallest residential buildings and the third tallest building in Eastern District on Hong Kong Island, so it is one of the landmark buildings in the district.

== History and naming ==
Grand Promenade was formerly the Sai Wan Ho Ferry Pier. In Jyutping, Grand Promenade is pronounced as "Ga Hang Waan". The name 'Ga Hang' implies smooth sailing in all endeavours, with 'Ga' representing diversity and inclusivity, 'Hang' representing smoothness and unobstructed progress, and 'Waan' representing the waterfront location of the property. The name embodies the ideal of a high-quality, seaside residence on Hong Kong Island where everything goes smoothly.

== Housing ==
Completed in 2005 by Henderson Land Development, there are 5 residential towers (Tower 4 omitted) in a L-shape built upon the base with a total of 2,020 apartments. Residential floors start from 7/F or 8/F to 71/F or 73/F (4/F, 14/F, 24/F, 34/F, 40/F, 44/F, 54/F & 64/F omitted), have 3 to 8 units per floor and a saleable area of 293 sq.ft to 2,170 sq.ft. Each unit has a balcony or flat roof. The penthouses have a rooftop with a jacuzzi.

Rank	Name	Chinese name	Height (m)	Height (ft)	Floor count
1	Grand Promenade 2—5	嘉亨灣第二至五座	219	718	66
2	Grand Promenade 1	嘉亨灣第一座	213	700	63
2	Grand Promenade 6	嘉亨灣第六座	213	700	63

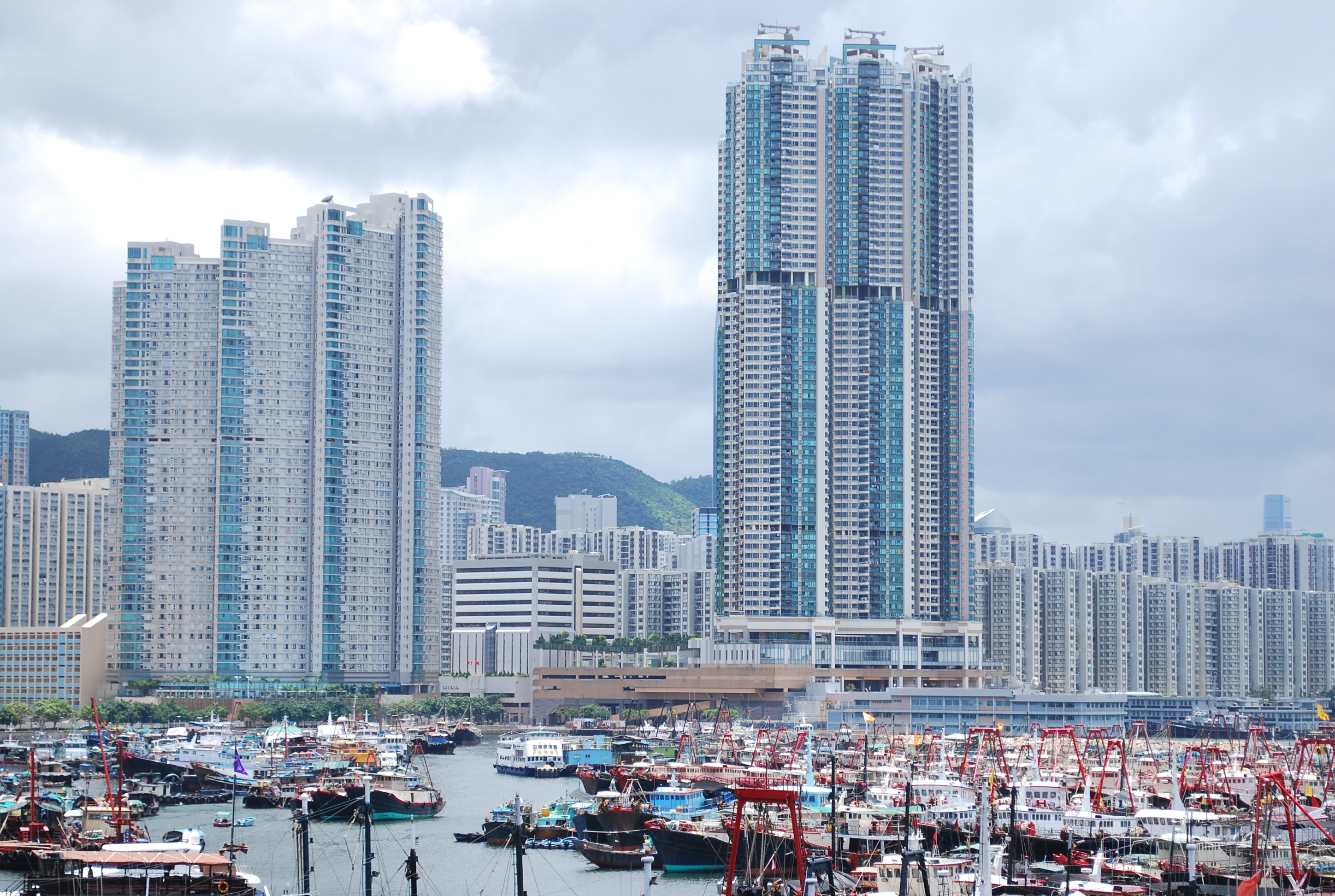
Grand Promenade (Right) from Hong Kong Museum of Coastal Defence

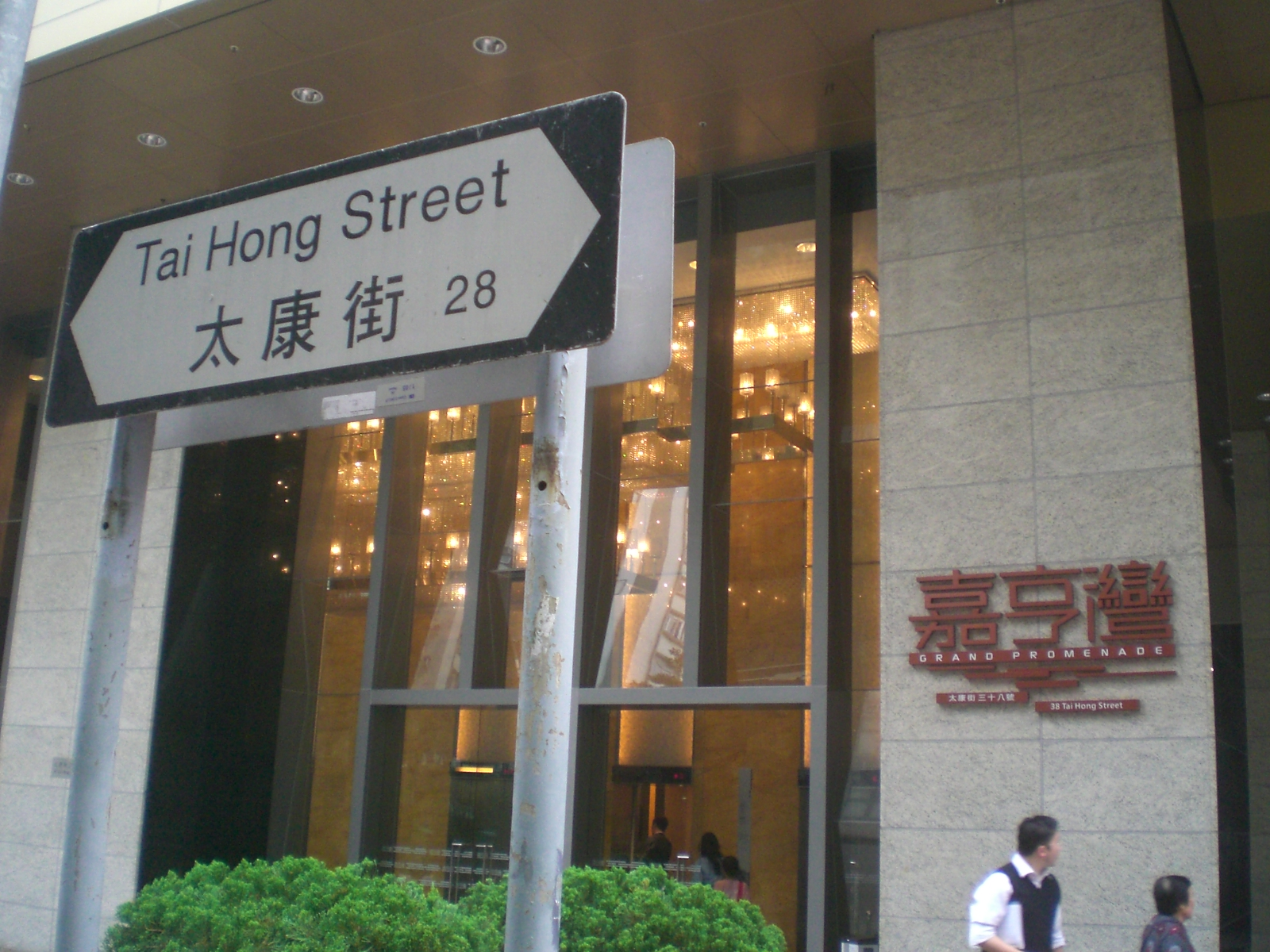
Entrance of Grand Promenade

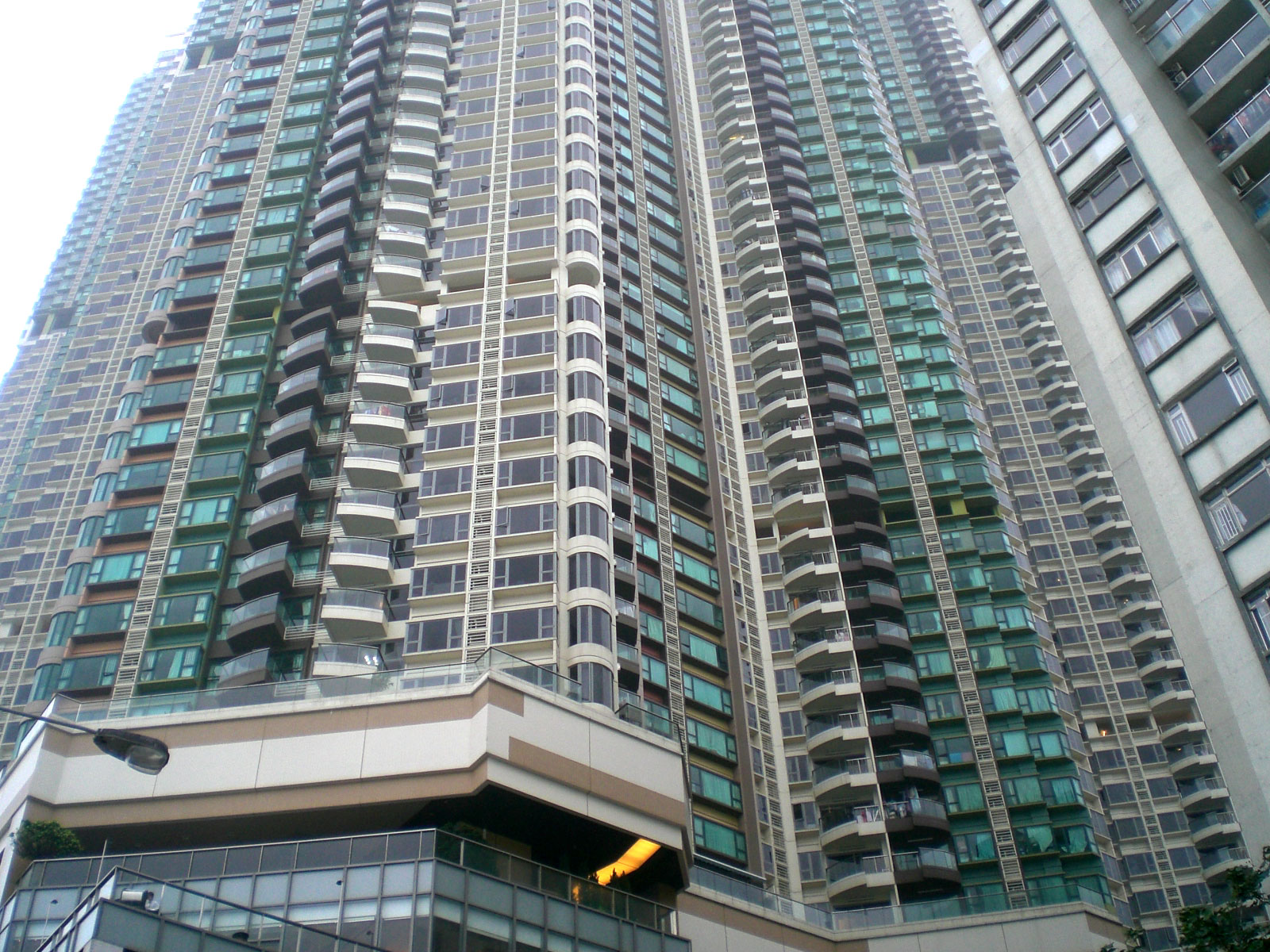
Grand Promenade

== Amenities ==
The development has an extensive clubhouse facilities. Club@Sea, currently located on the 6th floor, covers an area of 130,000 sq.ft. and has more than 70 facilities, which are categorised into four themes: Leisure World, Fitness World, Sports World and Family Kingdom. Facilities include a table tennis room, multi-function room, art studio, game room, band room, Chinese opera room, glow bowling centre, American pool/snooker, karaoke rooms, aerobics/yoga room, piano rooms, conference room, golf simulator room, learning kitchen room, gymnasium, tepidarium, wine gallery etc. Also, it has a garden-style garden platform and sky garden, a 25-meter outdoor all-weather swimming pool, a private dog park and a jogging trail, providing the resident with space for fresh air and entertainment.

== Ancillary facilities ==
Next to Lei King Wan, there is a gathering area of various speciality restaurants - "SOHO East", as well as supermarkets and daily necessities chain stores on the ground floor. There are many livelihood stores and restaurants around MTR Sai Wan Ho Station, banks, shopping malls, cooked food centres and markets. In terms of community recreational facilities, there are Quarry Bay Park, Aldrich Bay Park, Sai Wan Ho Waterfront Park, Island East Sports Centre, Sai Wan Ho Sports Center, Sai Wan Ho Playground and Sai Wan Ho Civic Centre nearby for public use.

Grand Promenade is close to Cityplaza and the core business district of Taikoo Place, and there are many international schools nearby, with complete living and transportation facilities. Therefore, it is favoured by business and corporate tenants and expats like Hong Kong drifter, Japanese and Korean families. At the same time, it also attracts professionals and middle-class people to live here.

== Transportation ==
Grand Promenade is accessible by public transportation and road, with major highways nearby. It is located c. 5 minutes away from Sai Wan Ho MTR station while being next to the Harbour and within easy access to the central business districts in Hong Kong. Grand Promenade is located just a c. 10 minute walk distance to Taikoo Place in Quarry Bay and it is just c. 12-18 minutes away only to Causeway Bay and Central, Hong Kong by MTR.

There is a public transport interchange on the ground floor of Grand Promenade and a 3-story parking lot on the upper floor. There are also many direct bus and minibus routes to Causeway Bay, Admiralty, Central, Stanley etc. There are also various other means of transportation nearby, including trams and ferries to Kwun Tong & Lei Yue Mun.

The system is heavily used by people and tenants who work and study on Hong Kong Island and Kowloon East, especially Hong Kong drifters and professionals who work in Central, Admiralty, Wan Chai and Quarry Bay. Additionally, many professionals and middle-class people who live there also use the system.

== Education ==
Grand Promenade is in secondary school Eastern District School net, while in Primary One Admission (POA) School Net 14. Many reputable primary schools are in the School Net 14, such as Pun U Association Wah Yan Primary School, Canossa School Hong Kong, Kiangsu & Chekiang Primary School and North Point Government Primary School. For secondary schools, Belilios Public School, Canossa College, Cheung Chuk Shan College, Hong Kong Chinese Women's Club College, St. Mark's School, Munsang College (Hong Kong Island) and Shau Kei Wan Government Secondary School etc. are located in Eastern District secondary school net.

Grand Promenade is also close to various international schools, such as the Korean International School of Hong Kong, DSC International School Hong Kong, The International Montessori School and ESF Quarry Bay School. The development is also near several reputable international nurseries such as Grace Garden International Kindergarten. And it only takes 30 minutes from Grand Promenade to the University of Hong Kong and Hong Kong Shue Yan University.

== Demographics ==
In the 2016 by-census, the estate population was recorded as 4,573. The median age of the residents was 36.9. Over 35% of the population is non-Chinese.

== History ==
The entire complex was developed by Henderson Land Development and its subsidiary, The Hongkong and Yaumati Ferry Co Ltd. Henderson Land won a tender for a site in Sai Wan Ho for Grand Promenade with a land premium of HK$2.43 billion in January 2001.

=== Controversy ===
==== Land calculation controversy ====
In July 2001, the developer successfully applied for and was granted permission to exclude the public transport terminus from the gross floor area in its building plan. A land tender controversy was caused when the Government maintained that former Director of Building Authority Leung Chin-man had reasonably exercised his discretionary powers to exempt the area of a public transport terminus in the gross floor area calculation of the development. The effect was to allow the addition of 10,700 square meters to the project, more than doubling the number of apartments from 1,008 to 2,020, costing the government HK$125 million in lost revenue.

In November 2005, the Audit Commission accused Leung of not conferring with other government departments before exercising his discretionary power, thus handing the developer an additional HK$3.2 billion. Leung tabled a judicial review. The two sides reached a deal in May 2006, when the Commissioner dropped legal proceedings, and Leung abandoned his judicial review.

==== Wall effect of area nearby ====
This property has been cited by the government and academics as having had a negative "wall effect" on surrounding neighbourhoods because of its bulky size on reclaimed land next to the harbour, which leads to poor air ventilation for nearby residents.

The awarding of the tender in 2001 to billionaire Lee Shau Kee's Henderson Land Development was met with much controversy over the calculation of land premium. The result of this controversial episode was the massive size of the towers and the aforementioned negative "wall effect".

== See also ==
- List of tallest buildings in Hong Kong
- Les Saisons
