= Les Saisons (Hong Kong) =

Housing estate in Sai Wan Ho, Hong Kong

Coordinates: 22.28377°N 114.22476°E

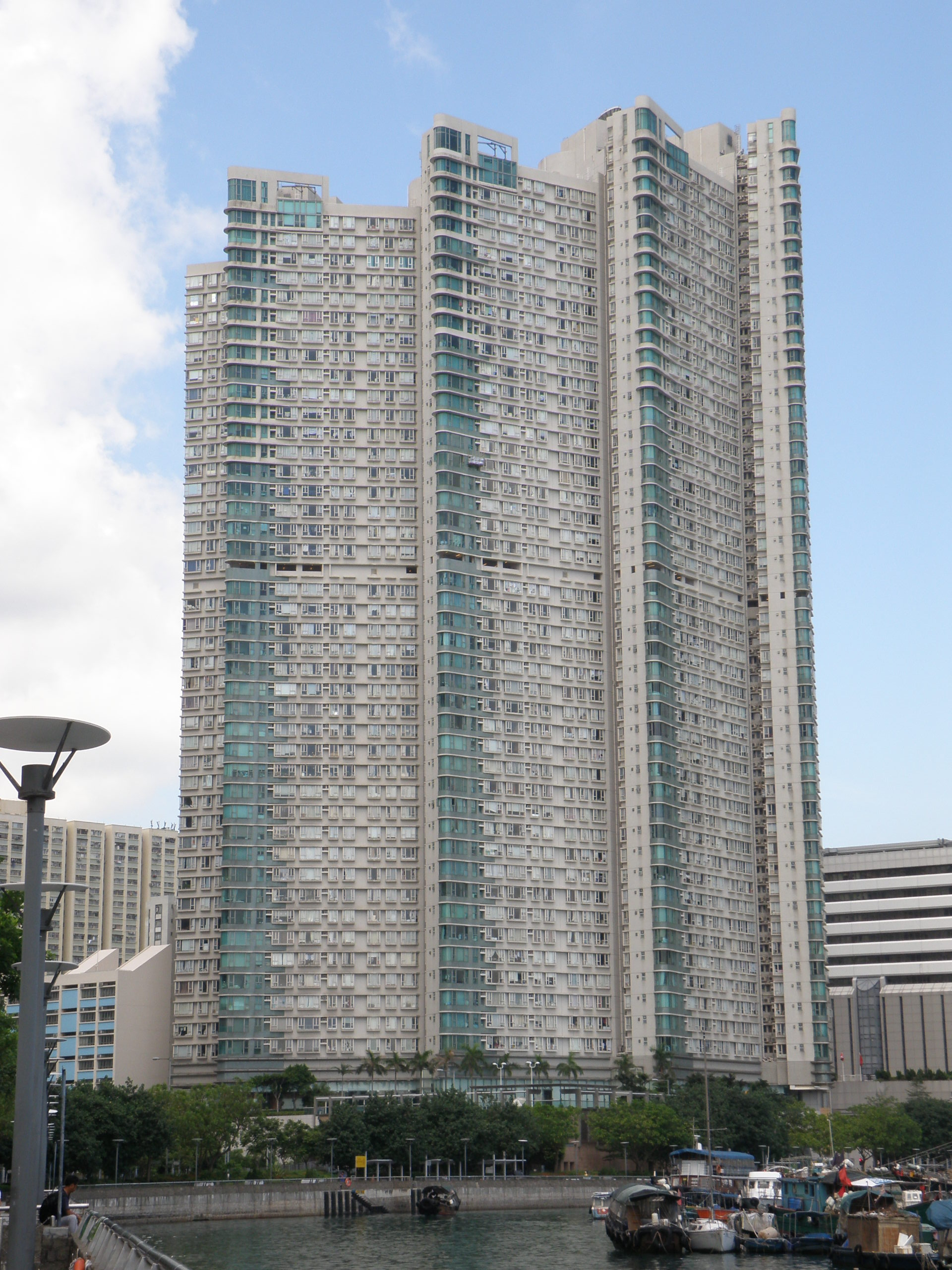
Flats facing the sea are equipped with curved windows

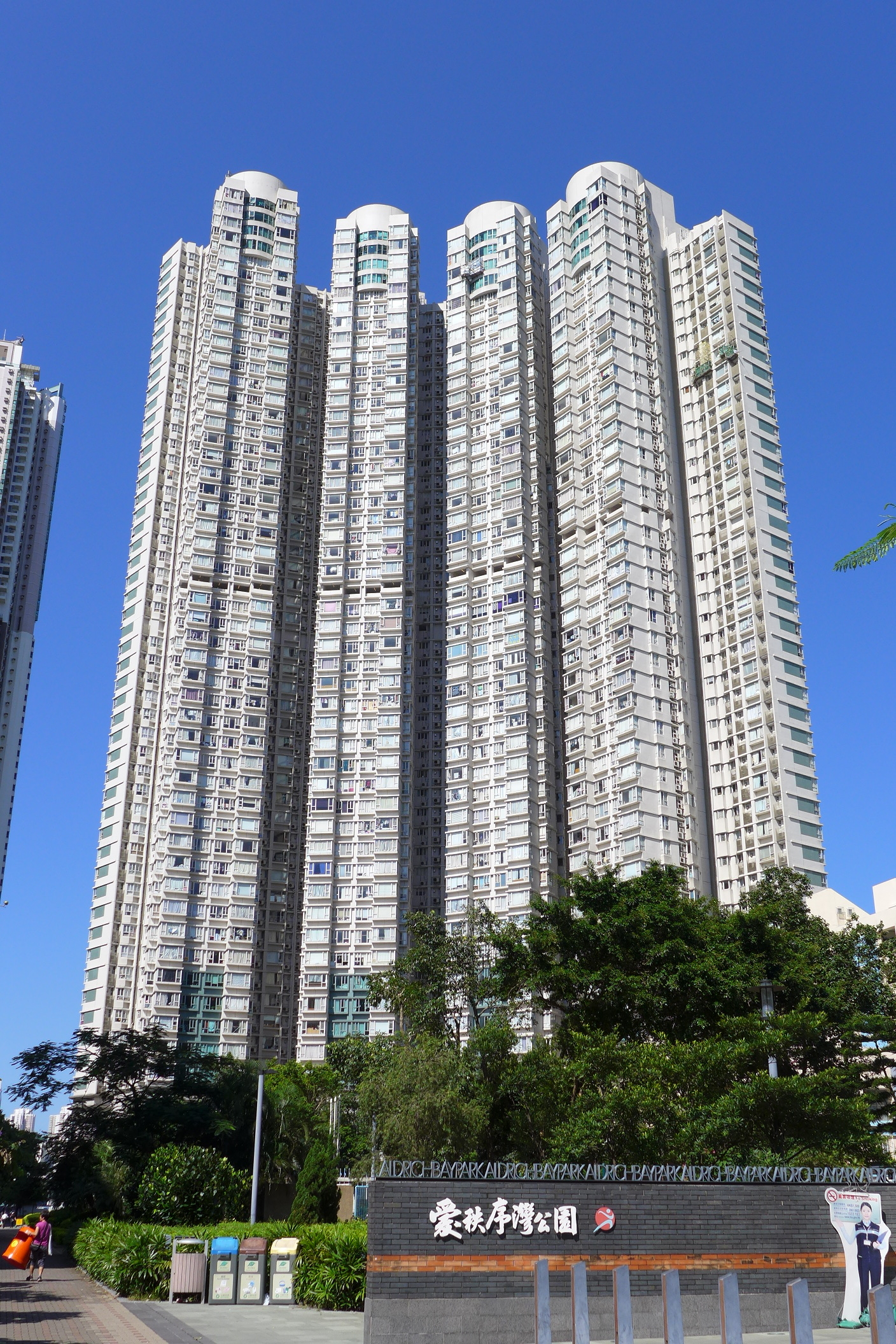
Flats with street view facing southwest

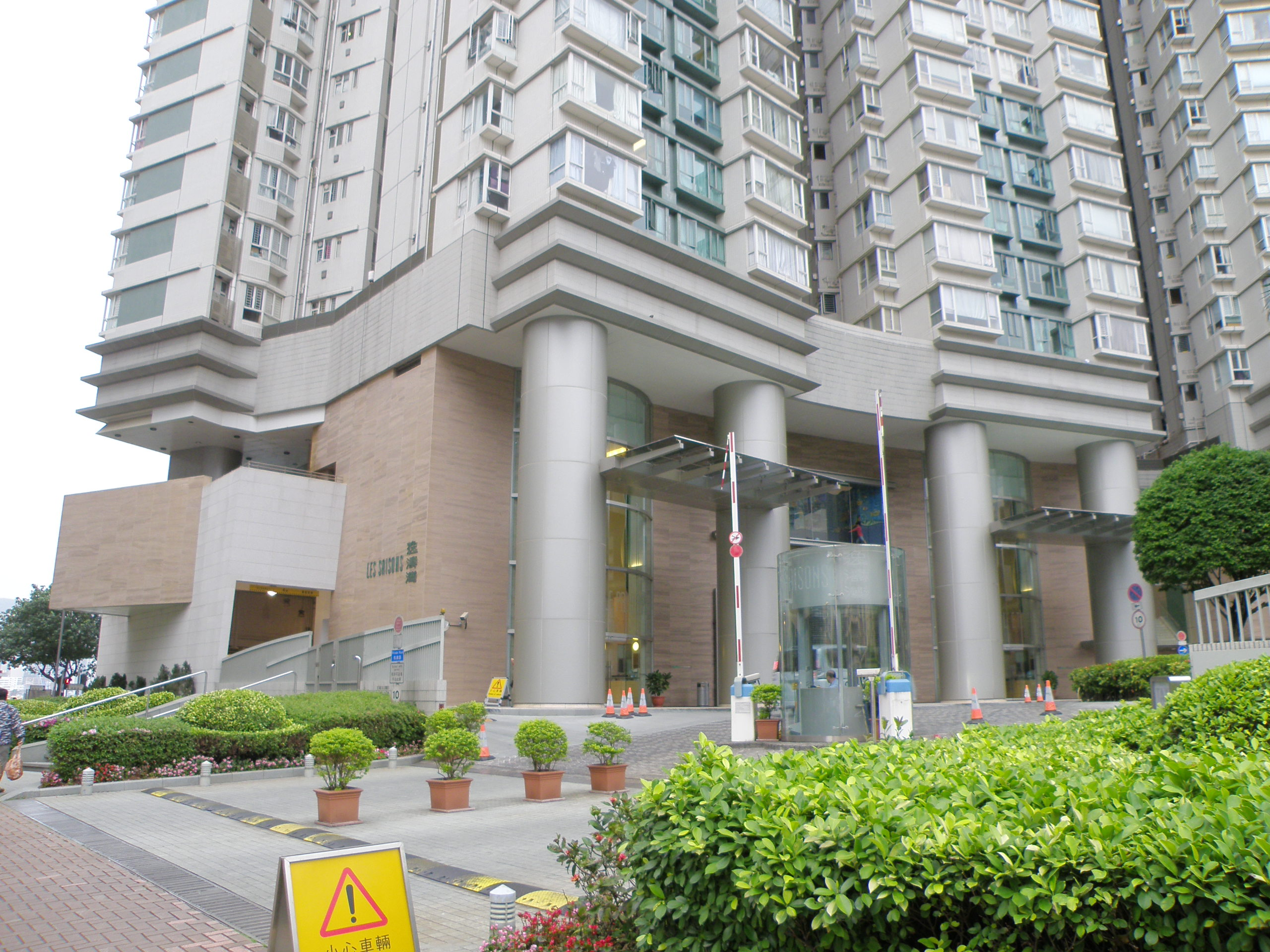
Lobby and car entrance of Les Saisons

Les Saisons (Chinese: 逸濤灣) is a private estate in Hong Kong. Located in Sai Wan Ho of the Eastern District, Hong Kong Island, the property was co-developed by Swire Properties, China Motor Bus and Sun Hung Kai Properties. The estate was completed in October 2001. There is a total of 4 residential buildings with 866 car park spaces provided. More than half of the flats enjoy the sea view of Lei Yue Mun Strait.

== History ==
Adjacent to Les Saisons, vacant land owned by the government was originally the designated site of the Hong Kong Ice Sports Centre. However, the plan was abandoned while the Aldrich Bay Park, a park featuring an old fishing village was built instead. Before the construction of the park, it was once a temporary golf course for training purposes. As the fence blocked certain flats' scenery and the light pollution problem was serious, some of the residents protested against it.

== Ancillary facilities ==
Next to Lei King Wan, there is a gathering area of various speciality restaurants - "SOHO East", as well as supermarkets and daily necessities chain stores on the ground floor. There are many livelihood stores and restaurants around MTR Sai Wan Ho Station, banks, shopping malls, cooked food centres and markets. In terms of community recreational facilities, there are Quarry Bay Park, Aldrich Bay Park, Sai Wan Ho Waterfront Park, Island East Sports Centre, Sai Wan Ho Sports Center, Sai Wan Ho Playground and Sai Wan Ho Civic Centre nearby for public use.

Les Saisons is close to Cityplaza and the core business district of Taikoo Place, and there are many international schools nearby, with complete living and transportation facilities. Therefore, it is favoured by business and corporate tenants and expats like Hong Kong drifter, Japanese and Korean families. At the same time, it also attracts professionals and middle-class families to live here.

== Transportation ==
Les Saisons is accessible by public transportation and road, with major highways nearby. It is located 4-min away from Sai Wan Ho MTR station while being next to the Harbour and within easy access to the central business districts in Hong Kong. Les Saisons is located just a 10-min walk distance to Taikoo Place in Quarry Bay and it is just 12min- & 18min-away only to Causeway Bay and Central, Hong Kong by MTR.

There is a public transport interchange on the ground floor of Grand Promenade. There are many direct bus and minibus routes to Causeway Bay, Admiralty, Central, Stanley etc. There are also various transportation nearby, including trams and ferries to Kwun Tong & Lei Yue Mun.

Therefore, it is favoured by people and tenants who work and study on Hong Kong Island and Kowloon East, especially Hong Kong drifters and professionals who work in Central, Admiralty, Wan Chai and Quarry Bay. At the same time, it also attracts plenty of professionals and middle-class families to live here.

== Education ==
Les Saisons is in secondary school Eastern District School net, while in Primary One Admission (POA) School Net 14. Many reputable primary schools are in the School Net 14, such as Pun U Association Wah Yan Primary School, Canossa School Hong Kong, Kiangsu & Chekiang Primary School and North Point Government Primary School. For secondary schools, Belilios Public School, Canossa College, Cheung Chuk Shan College, Hong Kong Chinese Women's Club College, St. Mark's School, Munsang College (Hong Kong Island) and Shau Kei Wan Government Secondary School etc. are located in Eastern District secondary school net.

Les Saisons is also close to various international schools, such as the Korean International School of Hong Kong, DSC International School Hong Kong, The International Montessori School and ESF Quarry Bay School. The development is also near several reputable international nurseries such as Grace Garden International Kindergarten. And it only takes 30 minutes from Les Saisons to the University of Hong Kong and Hong Kong Shue Yan University.

== See also ==
- List of tallest buildings in Hong Kong
- Grand Promenade
