= Tai On Building =

Coordinates: 22.282842°N 114.221983°E

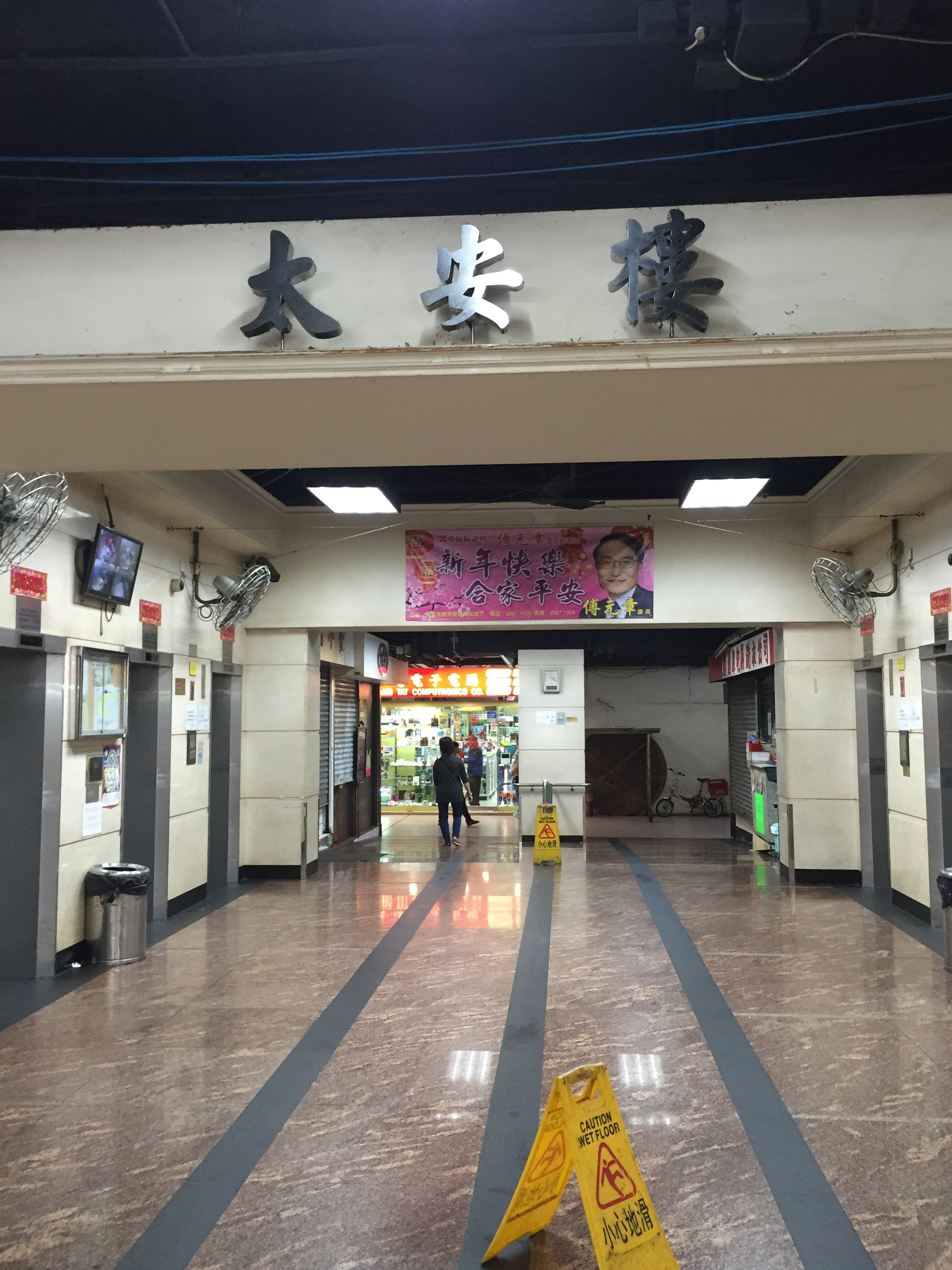
- The lobby

General information
- Location: 57-87 Shau Kei Wan Road, Sai Wan Ho, Hong Kong Island
- Completed: 1968; 57 years ago
- Height: 28 floors

Design and construction
- Developer: Hongkong Land Holdings Limited

Other information
- Facilities: Stores, 1st floor garden, car park, petrol station, numerous eateries like McDonald's, Café de Coral and many more

The Tai On Building is a residential and commercial building in Sai Wan Ho, Hong Kong. It was once one of the largest buildings in the district and remains a landmark. The ground floor arcade is well known for its many snack shops.

== History and background ==
Tai On Building is located at 57-87 Shau Kei Wan Road on Hong Kong Island, which is next to the Sai Wan Ho MTR station and the tram stop of Tai On Street. It was constructed by Hong Kong Land Buildings Limited in 1968. It was designed as a H-block, which was the common structure of residential properties in the 1960s. It has 28 storeys from the ground floor to the 28th floor, there are 68 flats per floor, a total of 1,884 flats all together, and 16 lifts for the entire building. Before land reclamation in around 1978, it was alongside the coastal area.

In the early 1960s, there were no walled residential buildings in Sai Wan Ho area. Thus, the construction of Tai On Building was a sensation at that time and Hong Kong Land Buildings Limited received more than ten thousand applications. There are two types of flats (375 square feet and 465 square feet including a common area) in Tai On Building. In the earlier years, the most expensive flat cost only from $17,300-$27,000, and the buyer only needed to pay a 10% initial deposit while the whole installment payment could be paid off in a maximum of 14 years. Thus, the common working class could also afford the payment.

Besides residence, it also consists of a shopping centre, parking lot, petrol station, and an open garden/terrace area on the waterfront side on the first floor. Once upon a time, Tai On Building had its own cinema named Tai On Cinema which was located at the current McDonald's restaurant. The 20,000 square feet shopping center is on the ground floor with around hundred shops, including food stalls, grocery stores, Chinese restaurant, stationery store, laundry shop, hardware store, clinic, bookstore, game center, etc. Due to the variety of shops, many locals in the area besides the building residents often visit Tai On Building for goods and services.

Tai On Building is famous for the food stalls. Visitors can find many local snacks from those shops. Besides, as most of the food stalls open at night, Tai On Building has been nicknamed "the night market of Hong Kong Island". Ten years ago, some of the food stalls did not have the Food Factory License issued by the Food and Environmental Hygiene Department. However, in recent years, most of the food stalls have been licensed, and therefore the hygiene status has been improved.

Nowadays, many Hong Kong-style snacks are going to disappear as the young generations are not interested in preserving the local refreshments. However, as Tai On Building is providing more and more local cuisines, the popularity of Tai On Building continues to grow. Besides, the most special thing is, currently, not only local citizens but also tourists from all over the world are interested in visiting Tai On Building. As a result, in the future, it may become one of the hottest eating spots in Hong Kong.

== Features ==
=== Door-to-door delivery ===
There are 1,884 flats in the Tai On Building. However, for security reasons, there are no standard mailboxes for flat-owners in the lobby. In the past few years, the Owners’ Association of Tai On Building looked to construct letterboxes on every floor. However, the cost was deemed too expensive, and the Owners’ Association gave up on the idea. As a result, postal delivery personnel have to walk along the H-block for delivery every time.

=== No visitor registration ===
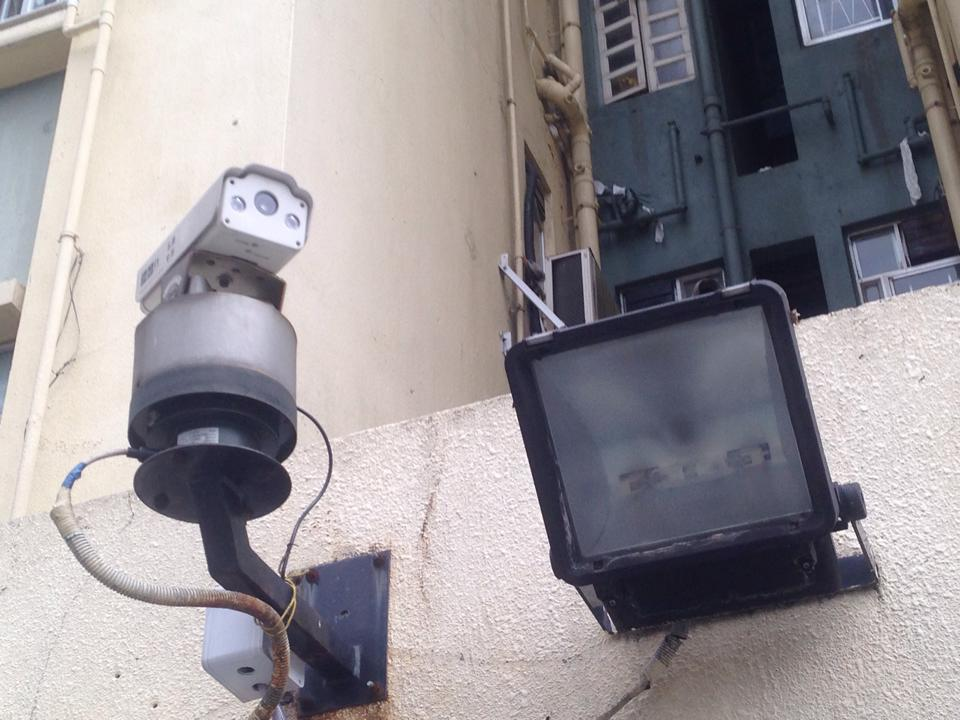
CCTV of Tai On Building

Unlike other typical housing estates, visitors to Tai On Building can go straight up the stairs without any registration. However, there are more than 200 CCTV in different areas, especially at the corners. In addition, there are plainclothes guards working for 24 hours. As a result, crime has been reduced in recent years.

=== Obsolete fountain ===
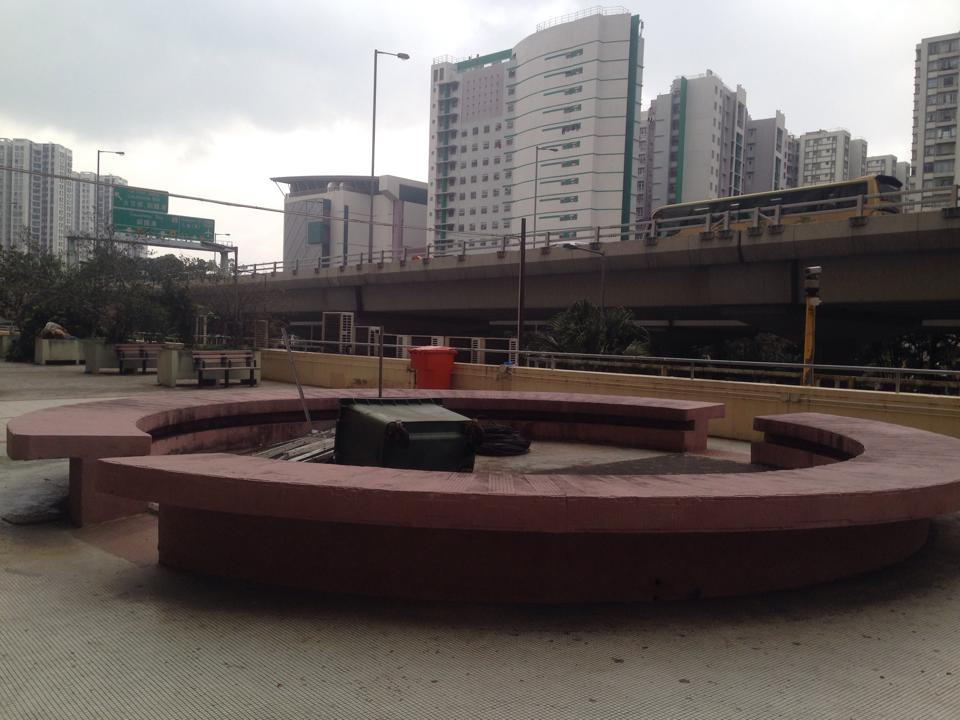
The fountain of Tai On building

On the first floor of the Tai On Building, there is a non-functional fountain. In the past, the first-floor terrace had a great broad view of the harbour and because of that reason, it used to be an excellent place for residents and guests to relax and chill out. At one point, the fountain was a place for residence to launch their battery-operated toy vessels/boats in the late 1960s and early 1970s, it drew quite a large crowd. When the building first opened to the public, there was a huge party with local bands and popular singers on top of the fountain one weekend and since then, it has been nicknamed "The most colourful lighting fountain" by the public. The advertising agencies also took it as a selling point for Tai On Building and it has presented the former's glory. However, due to the security reasons, the fountain has been abandoned years ago. Nowadays, people can only see the periphery of the fountain and few chairs on the first-floor garden.

== Snacks ==
Numerous Hong Kong "street snacks" can be found in Tai On Building, for instance, egg waffles, bovine offals, cart noodles, fish balls, torn pancakes, and others. At midnight, you have to wait for a long time to order food as there is a sea of people.

=== Egg waffles ===
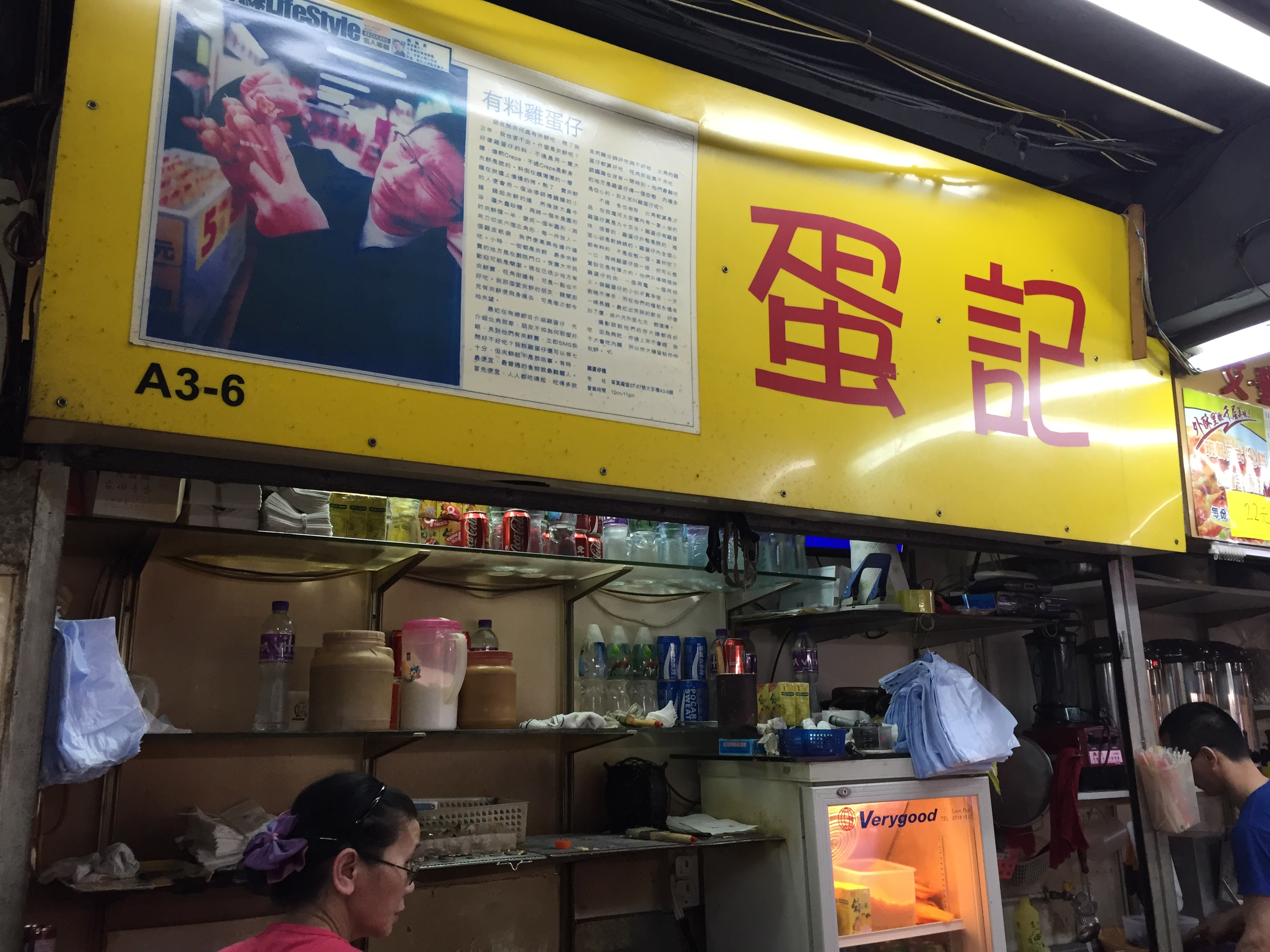
Egg Waffle @ Dan Kee

Gai daan tsai (egg waffles) is the most famous food in Tai On Building and it costs about $13 Hong Kong dollars. So Sze Wong, a famous food critic, put it, "This egg waffle is wonderful as it is crispy and tender". Besides, the gai daan tsai in Tai On Building has been awarded as "one of the best egg waffles in Hong Kong" by CNN.

=== Offal (beef) ===
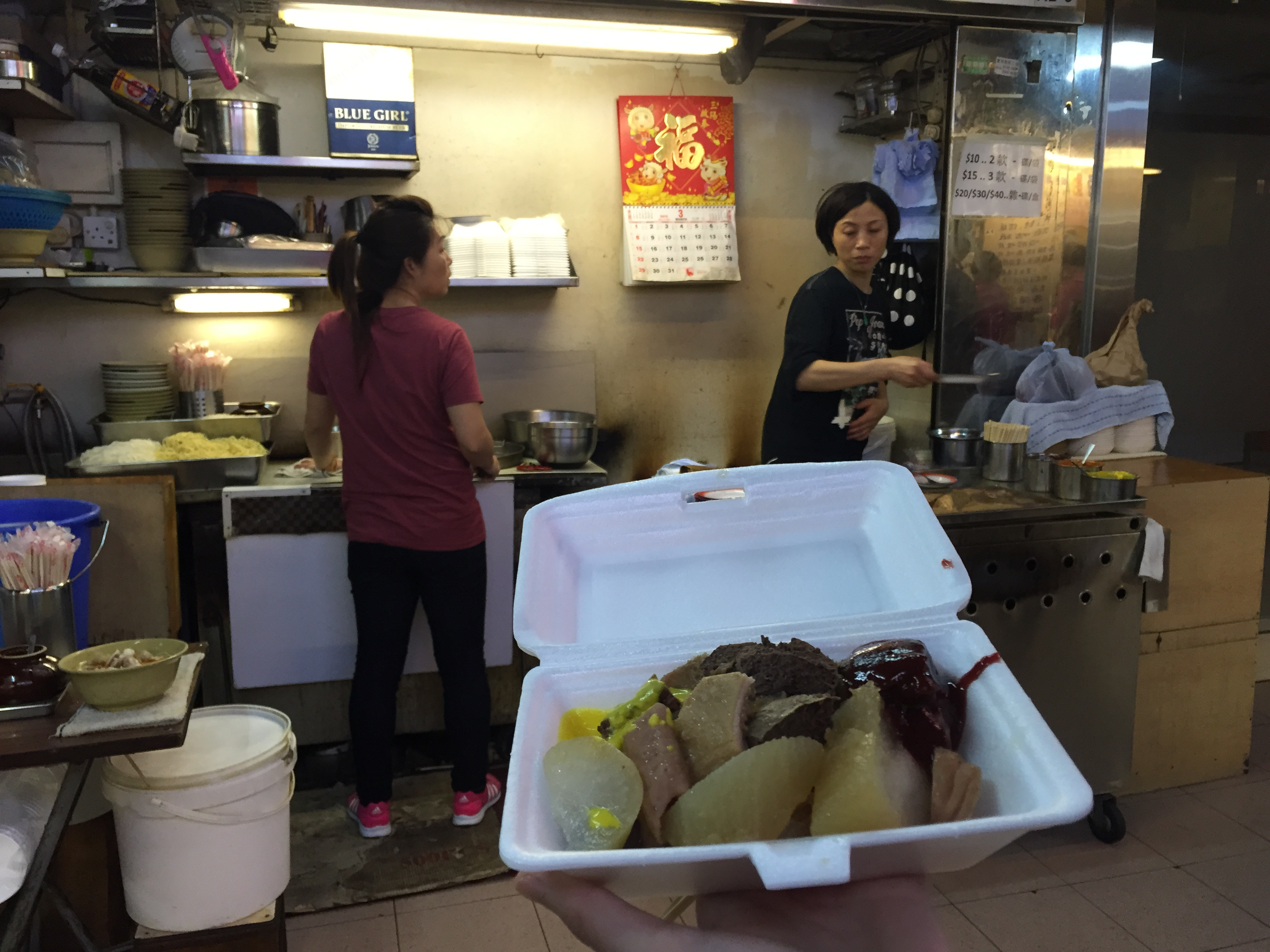
Offal@Tai On Building

Other than egg waffles, bovine offal is also well known in Tai On Building. It is a cheaper "street snack" in Hong Kong which only costs about $20 to $30 Hong Kong dollars depending on the size. It is a must to eat with sweet sauce and mustard.

=== Cart noodle ===
The cart noodles store is located near one of the entrances. There are more than 40 toppings for you to choose from, including chicken wing, vegetable, beef brisket, wonton, spring roll, and more. There are also two soup bases, ranging from original to curry. Each bowl of noodles includes three different toppings, and each additional topping costs HK$3.

=== Torn pancake ===
A bit different from Taiwan torn pancakes, torn pancakes in Tai On Building have mixed with Hong Kong style. It is located in the middle of the Tai On Building. Over 30 toppings can be chosen like mushrooms, cheese, beef, corn, sausages, and others. People can make their personal torn pancakes by mixing with various toppings and different sauces. It costs about 20 Hong Kong dollars.

=== Tong sui (dessert) ===
In Tai On Building, tong sui must be mentioned as many people are attracted by its reputation. The 80 feet dessert cafe serves numerous traditional tong sui, like red bean paste, green bean paste, dumplings, black sesame soup, walnut soup, and others.

=== Bubble tea ===
The oldest known bubble tea consisted of a mixture of hot Taiwanese black tea, small tapioca pearls, condensed milk, and syrup. Nowadays, many variations were created, the most common of which is served cold rather than hot. In Tai On Building, there are five or six shops providing bubble tea and other types of drinks such as foam red tea.
