= Sha Tin Town Hall =

Building in Sha Tin District, Hong Kong

Coordinates: 22°22′53″N 114°11′24″E

- 沙田大會堂
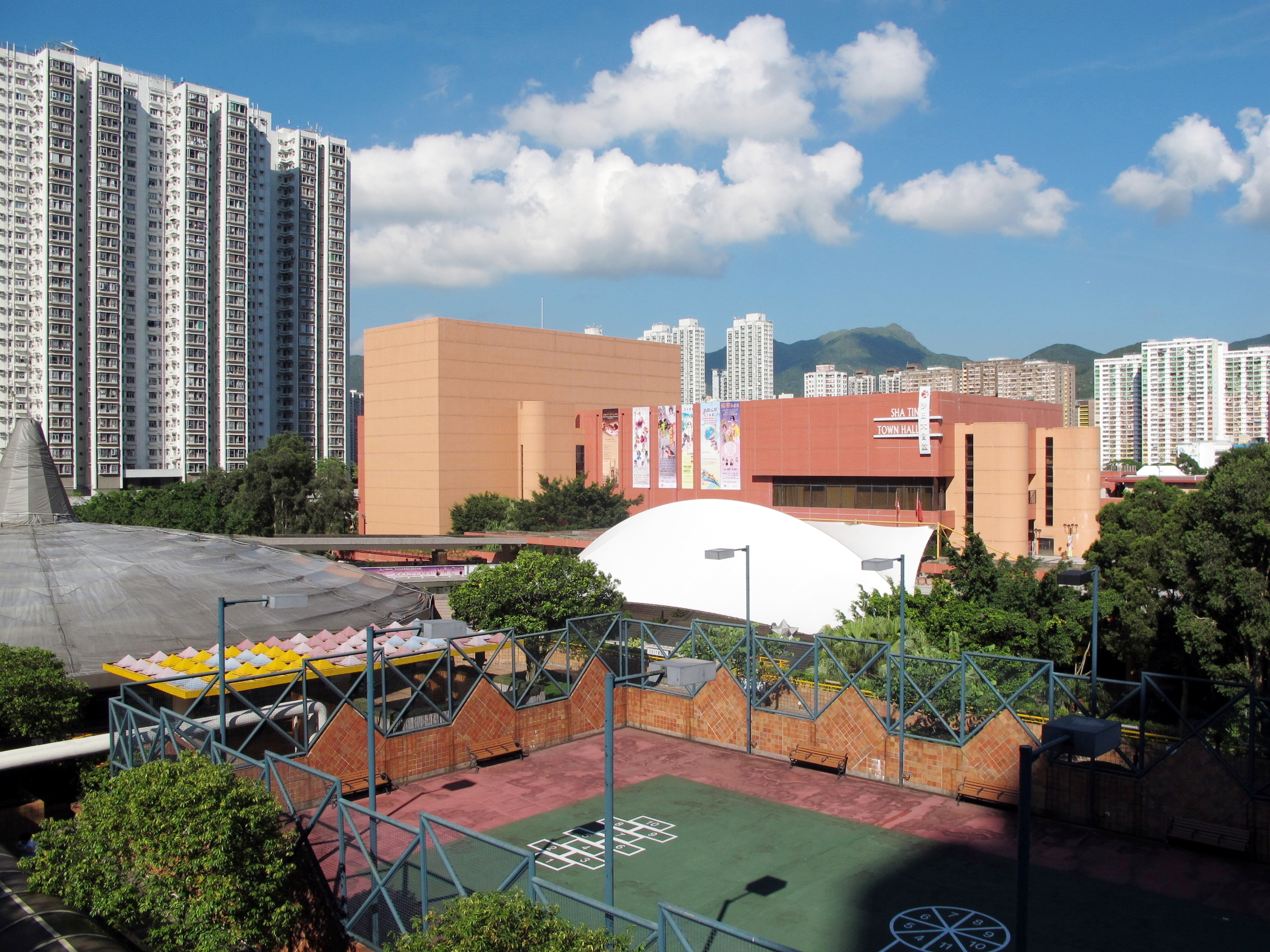
- Sha Tin Town Hall

General information
- Type: Town Hall
- Location: Sha Tin District, 1 Yuen Wo Road, Hong Kong
- Opened: 16 January 1987; 39 years ago
- Owner: Hong Kong Government
- Landlord: Leisure and Cultural Services Department

Website
- Official website

Sha Tin Town Hall
- Traditional Chinese: 沙田大會堂
Transcriptions
Standard Mandarin
- Hanyu Pinyin: Shātián Dàhuìtáng
Yue: Cantonese
- Yale Romanization: Sāa tìhn daaih wuih tòhng
- Jyutping: Saa1 tin4 daai6 wui6 tong4

Sha Tin Town Hall is a town hall at the town centre of the Sha Tin District in Hong Kong. It is located near Sha Tin station, Sha Tin Park and New Town Plaza. It is part of the podium complex which includes the Sha Tin Town Hall, Sha Tin Public Library and the Sha Tin Marriage Registry.

The facility was formerly governed by the Regional Council but has been transferred to the jurisdiction of the Leisure and Cultural Services Department.

== History ==
The Sha Tin Town Hall broke ground on 1 March 1982 by then Murray MacLehose, Baron MacLehose of Beoch, then Governor of Hong Kong. The town hall opened on 16 January 1987 by David Akers-Jones, then acting Governor of Hong Kong.

== See also ==
- Hong Kong City Hall
- Sai Wan Ho Civic Centre
- Tsuen Wan Town Hall
- Tuen Mun Town Hall
