= Sai Wan Ho =

Neighbourhood in Hong Kong

Sai Wan Ho 西灣河
- Neighbourhood
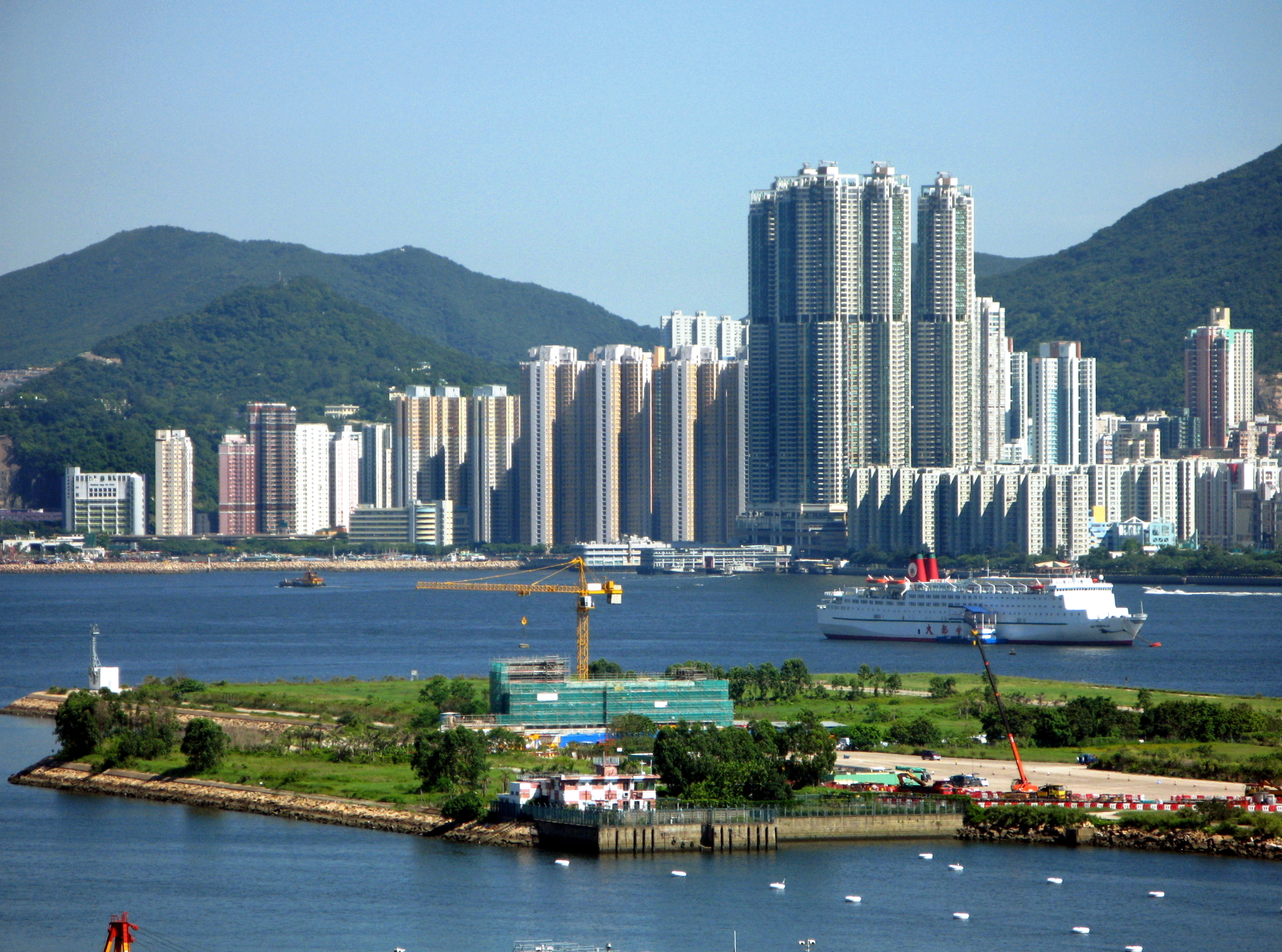
- Sai Wan Ho Skyline along the Victoria Harbour

- Location within Hong Kong
- Coordinates: 22°16′55″N 114°13′15″E
- Country: China
- SAR: Hong Kong
- District: Eastern District
- Time zone: UTC+8 (HKT)

Sai Wan Ho
- Traditional Chinese: 西灣河
- Simplified Chinese: 西湾河
- Jyutping: Sai^{1} Waan^{1} Ho^{4*2}
- Literal meaning: West Bay River
Transcriptions
Standard Mandarin
- Hanyu Pinyin: Xīwānhé
Yue: Cantonese
- Jyutping: Sai^{1} Waan^{1} Ho^{4*2}

Sai Wan Ho is a primarily residential area on the northeastern shore of Hong Kong Island, Hong Kong, between Quarry Bay and Shau Kei Wan. It is part of the Eastern District, and is administered together with surrounding areas under the Eastern District Council.

Suppose the area is divided by the Island Eastern Corridor, the seaside side of the new reclamation area to the north of the corridor area are private estates such as Grand Promenade, Les Saisons and Lei King Wan, the other side of the corridor area is dominated by old buildings, that is, it is built along the main road Shau Kei Wan Road. New private residences are also completed in the area, such as THE HOLBORN, which is completed in 2023 and Island Residence which is completed in 2017.

Some government agencies and buildings, such as the Eastern Law Court Building (Eastern Magistrates' Courts), Marine Police Regional Headquarters, Hong Kong Film Archive, Sai Wan Ho Civic Centre, etc. are located in Sai Wan Ho. Soho East and Tai On Building, known as the "Hong Kong Night Market", are also located in the area.

Sai Wan Ho has various means of transportation. Sai Wan Ho is about a 10-minute walk from the large shopping malls Cityplaza and Kornhill Plaza and the core business district of Taikoo Place. Also, it only takes 12 and 18 minutes to Causeway Bay and Central. There are ferries across Victoria Harbour between Kwun Tong and Yau Tong from Sai Wan Ho Ferry Pier, and between Tseung Kwan O from Shau Kei Wan Typhoon Shelter Landing as well.

== Location ==
Sai Wan Ho is conventionally agreed to extend between the Taikoo Shing Road, Shau Kei Wan Road and King's Road junction to the west, and the Shau Kei Wan tram depot in the east. It is bounded by the Victoria Harbour to the north, and mountains to the south.

== History ==
=== Early development ===
The Xin'an County Chronicle published in the 24th year of Jiaqing in the Qing Dynasty (1819) did not have any records about Sai Wan Ho.

According to relevant information, Sai Wan Ho had 420 residents in 1901, and there were markets and slaughterhouses. The outer wall of the market is made of red bricks, and it is divided into two parts, the inside and the outside. There is a tea stall outside, which is located in the current Sai Wan Ho Civic Center. There are also several shops on the sidewalk outside the market, including a noodle shop and a cotton tire shop.

Later, Sai Wan Ho used to be the dormitory of Taikoo Dockyard which accommodated more than 10,000 people at the beginning of the last century. It was completed in 1909. It was divided into 1st, 2nd, and 3rd Streets, which is the current Tai On Building. The building is 4 floors high, and each unit is divided into There are 4 to 5 married staff rooms, with 3 to 4 3-bunk beds outside the rooms, which are provided for single staff in the dock. The toilet and kitchen are shared by the whole unit, and the stove is wood-burning, which can accommodate more than 10,000 people.

At the time of the 1911 census, the population of Sai Wan Ho was 876. The number of males was 650.

=== Post-war development ===
In the 1960s, Shau Kei Wan and Sai Wan Ho were developed together. First, build Taixiang/Taishun/Taifu/Taikang four 11-story buildings behind Liwan Building, each floor has 18 units of dormitories, which are used to accommodate the employees of 1st, 2nd, and 3rd Streets to relocate to new dormitories. Because Taikoo Dockyard has its own pond, the running water in the dormitory is provided by the shipping company for free. Developed by Swire and completed in 1968, Tai On Building, located by the sea at that time, once became a local landmark.

The Tai On Building Building is an H-shaped building with a height of 28 floors. The basement is a large shopping mall, a gas station and a theatre (a small factory is in the middle), a parking space outside the factory, and a water station for fishing boats (at that time too The outside of Anlou is already the seaside). There are fresh fish, butcher shops, grocery stores, and grocery stores in the shopping mall. There is also a restaurant on the side of the tramway. There is a public telephone near the underground elevator for the convenience of residents. The platform facing the sea on the first floor is a public resting garden.

=== Residential development ===
Until 1979, Tai On Building was still located by the sea. However, in the 1980s, due to the multiple relocations of the Shau Kei Wan Pier and the construction of the Island Eastern Corridor, the waterfront of Sai Wan Ho continued to move northward. Up to now, the entire area of Lei King Wan has been reclaimed from the sea.

Going up from Cheng'an Street, before the 1980s, it was a wooden house area, including Cheng'an Village, Holy Cross Path Village, Auberong Village, etc. But in 1989, the government acquired the land and built public housing estates – Yiu Tung Estate and Hing Tung Estate.

=== Current ===
Sai Wan Ho is one of the predominantly residential areas in East Hong Kong Island. The new reclamation area to the north of the Eastern Corridor belongs to the high-end private housing estate residential area. The three major housing estates: Grand Promenade, Les Saisons and Lei King Wan are located on the seaside side of the corridor area. The waterfront of Sai Wan Ho is known as Soho East, and there are authentic Soho East restaurants, theme bars and speciality coffee shops gathered along the waterfront, forming a good place for dining and drinking.

On the other side of the corridor area, there are many flats under Home Ownership Scheme and a small number of public housing estates, such as Tung Hei Court, Tung Yan Court, Tung Lam Court, Tung Tao Court, Hing Tung Estate and Hong Tung Estate. There are also new private housing estates being completed in the area, such as THE HOLBORN, which is expected to be occupied in 2023, and Island Residence, which is expected to be completed in 2017.

== Housing ==
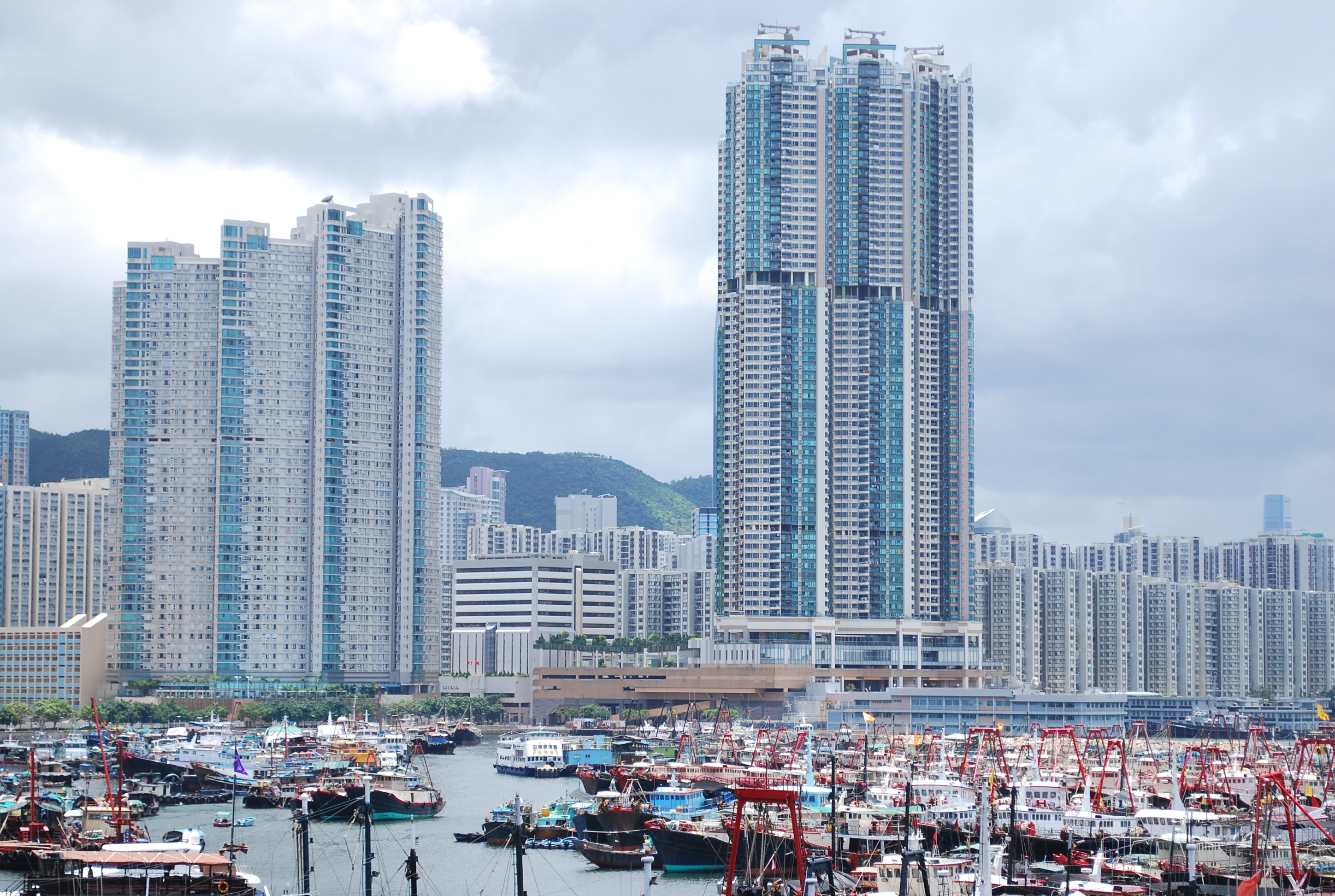
Les Saisons and Grand Promenade facing Shau Kei Wan Typhoon Shelter.

Sai Wan Ho is primarily residential. The hill was once filled with squatter settlements, which were later demolished and replaced with new residential buildings. Taikoo Shing, redeveloped from Taikoo Dockyard, spans the east end of the area. From the 1980s through the 2000s, extensive reclamation drastically reshaped the shore. Private housing estates were built near the new sea front, like Lei King Wan, Les Saisons and Grand Promenade. However, older buildings such as Tai On Building still remain further inland.

Name	Chinese name	Area	Completed	No. blocks	No. units	Developer	Photo	Coordinates
Grand Promenade	嘉亨灣	Sai Wan Ho	2006	5	2,020	Henderson Land Development, The Hongkong and Yaumati Ferry Co Ltd.		22.2850°N 114.2247°E
Lei King Wan	鯉景灣	Sai Wan Ho	1988	17	2,295	Swire Properties		
Les Saisons	逸濤灣	Sai Wan Ho	2001	4	864	Swire Properties, China Motor Bus, Sun Hung Kai Properties		

== Amenities and attractions ==
Sai Wan Ho is well-planned and there are many green spaces and recreational facilities in the area, especially along the waterfront, such as Aldrich Bay Park, Aldrich Bay Seaside Garden, Sai Wan Ho Waterfront Park, Quarry Bay Park, etc.

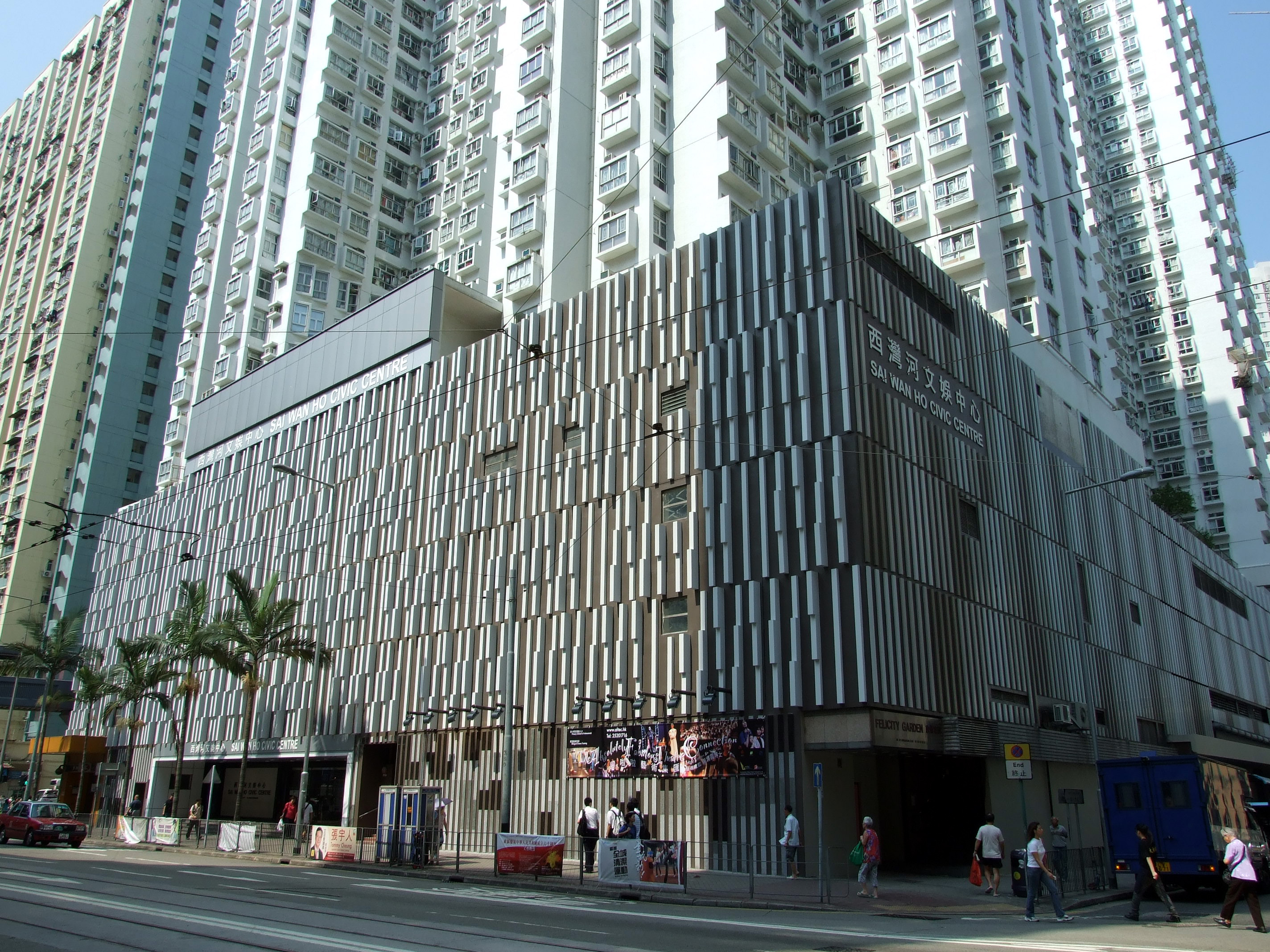
Sai Wan Ho Civic Centre.

- Sai Wan Ho Civic Centre, A community arts centre
- Hong Kong Film Archive
- Island East Sports Centre
- Sai Wan Ho Sports Centre
- Eastern Law Courts Building
- Sai Wan Ho Health Centre
- Aldrich Bay Park
- Sai Wan Ho Market, With Market and Cooked Food Centre
- Hong Kong Police Force Report Rooms, Traffic Hong Kong Island
- Sai Wan Ho Fire Station

== Education ==
Sai Wan Ho is home to a number of prestigious institutions, international schools, and special education. Sai Wan Ho is in Primary One Admission (POA) School Net 16. Within the school net are multiple aided schools (operated independently but funded with government money) and two government schools: Shau Kei Wan Government Primary School and Aldrich Bay Government Primary School.

- Hong Kong Chinese Women's Club College, Government aided co-educational grammar school
- Munsang College (Hong Kong Island), Government aided co-educational grammar school
- Korean International School of Hong Kong, International school (primary (reception to year 6) for ages 4–11, secondary (year 7–13) for ages 12–18, and Springboard (SEN) for ages 6–18)
- The International Montessori School, International school
- Island Children's Montessori Kindergarten (Lei King Wan), International school
- Grace Garden International Kindergarten (Lei King Wan), International school
- Baptist Pui Li School, local kindergarten
- Dominic Savio Kindergarten, local kindergarten
- HKFYG Ching Lok Kindergarten, local kindergarten
- Caritas Lok Yi School, special education school

== Transport ==
Sai Wan Ho has convenient transportation to and from various districts in Hong Kong, Kowloon and New Territories. Sai Wan Ho is about a 10-minute walk from the adjacent shopping malls Cityplaza and Taikoo Place business areas. The Island Line runs through Sai Wan Ho Station and shuttles to the north shore of Hong Kong Island. It takes 12 and 18 minutes for Sai Wan Ho to Causeway Bay and Central respectively.

In terms of buses, there are many bus routes on Shau Kei Wan Road between Hong Kong, Kowloon and the New Territories, many of which use Sai Wan Ho Grand Promenade as the terminus. Hong Kong Tramways run along Shau Kei Wan Road, providing a cheaper option for travelling across Hong Kong Island.

Also, there are ferries across Victoria Harbor between Kwun Tong and Yau Tong from Sai Wan Ho Ferry Pier, between Tseung Kwan O (South) from Shau Kei Wan Typhoon Shelter Landing as well.
