= Shau Kei Wan Road =

Road in Eastern District, Hong Kong

Coordinates: 22.27927°N 114.22612°E

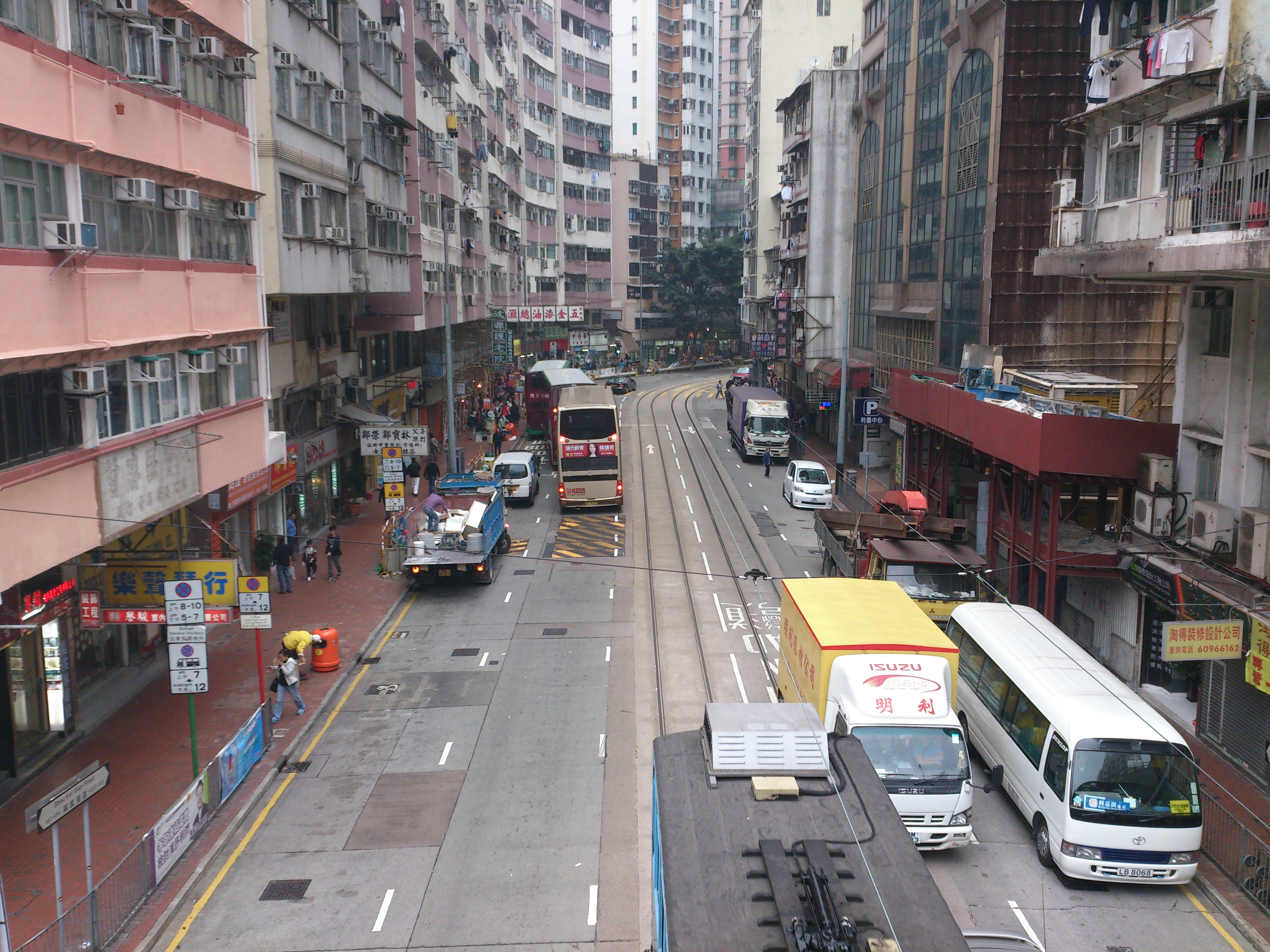
- Shau Kei Wan Road near Chai Wan Road in Shau Kei Wan in 2013
- Interactive map of Shau Kei Wan Road
- Native name: 筲箕灣道 (Yue Chinese)
- Location: Shau Kei Wan, Hong Kong

Construction
- Inauguration: 1935; 91 years ago

Shau Kei Wan Road
- Traditional Chinese: 筲箕灣道
- Simplified Chinese: 筲箕湾道
Transcriptions
Standard Mandarin
- Hanyu Pinyin: Shāojīwān Dào
Yue: Cantonese
- Jyutping: saau1 gei1 waan1 dou6

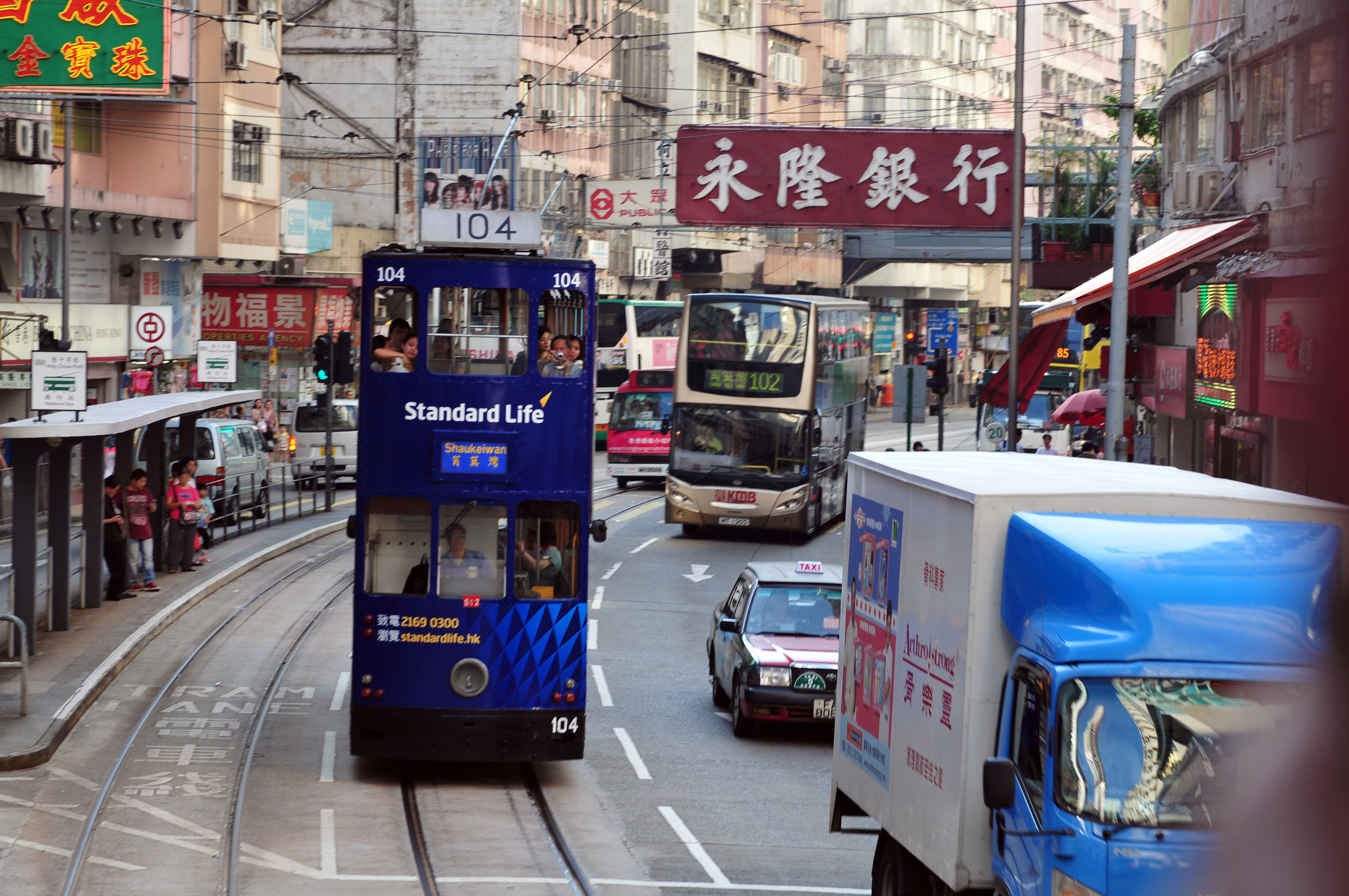
Shau Kei Wan Road near Holy Cross Path in Sai Wan Ho.

Shau Kei Wan Road (traditional Chinese: 筲箕灣道; simplified Chinese: 筲箕湾道; Jyutping: saau1 gei1 waan1 dou6), formerly known as Shaukiwan Road, is the main road in Shau Kei Wan and Sai Wan Ho, Hong Kong.

== History ==
The road was originally a main road lying on the north coast of Hong Kong Island from Causeway Bay to Shau Kei Wan, passing through North Point, Tsat Tsz Mui and Quarry Bay.

In 1935, the section between the east end of Causeway Road in Causeway Bay and Tai Kat Street near the East Gate of Taikoo Dockyard (present-day Taikoo Shing) was renamed to King's Road for the silver jubilee of the ascendent of George V of the United Kingdom. At the same time, the section from the junction of Causeway Road and King's Road to Power Street was renamed as Electric Road while the section between King's Road and Electric Road was renamed Tung Lo Wan Road.

== Features ==
The road is shared by Hong Kong Tramways tram tracks.

== Intersecting Streets ==
Roads are listed West to East.

- King's Road and Tai Koo Shing Road
- Tai Cheong Street
- Tai Foo Street
- Tai Hong Street and Tai Lok Street
- Tai Ning Street
- Tai On Street and Shing On Street - Sai Wan Ho Station is located here.
- Holy Cross Path
- Hoi Ning Street
- Hoi Lee Street
- Hoi An Street
- Hoi Foo Street and Hing Man Street
- Aldrich Bay Road
- Sun Sing Street
- Nam Hong Street
- Nam On Lane
- Aldrich Street
- Chai Wan Road
- Factory Street and Shau Kei Wan Main Street East

== See also ==
- List of streets and roads in Hong Kong
