= Tsuen Wan Town Hall =

Building in Tsuen Wan, Hong Kong

Coordinates: 22°22′15″N 114°06′46″E

- 荃灣大會堂
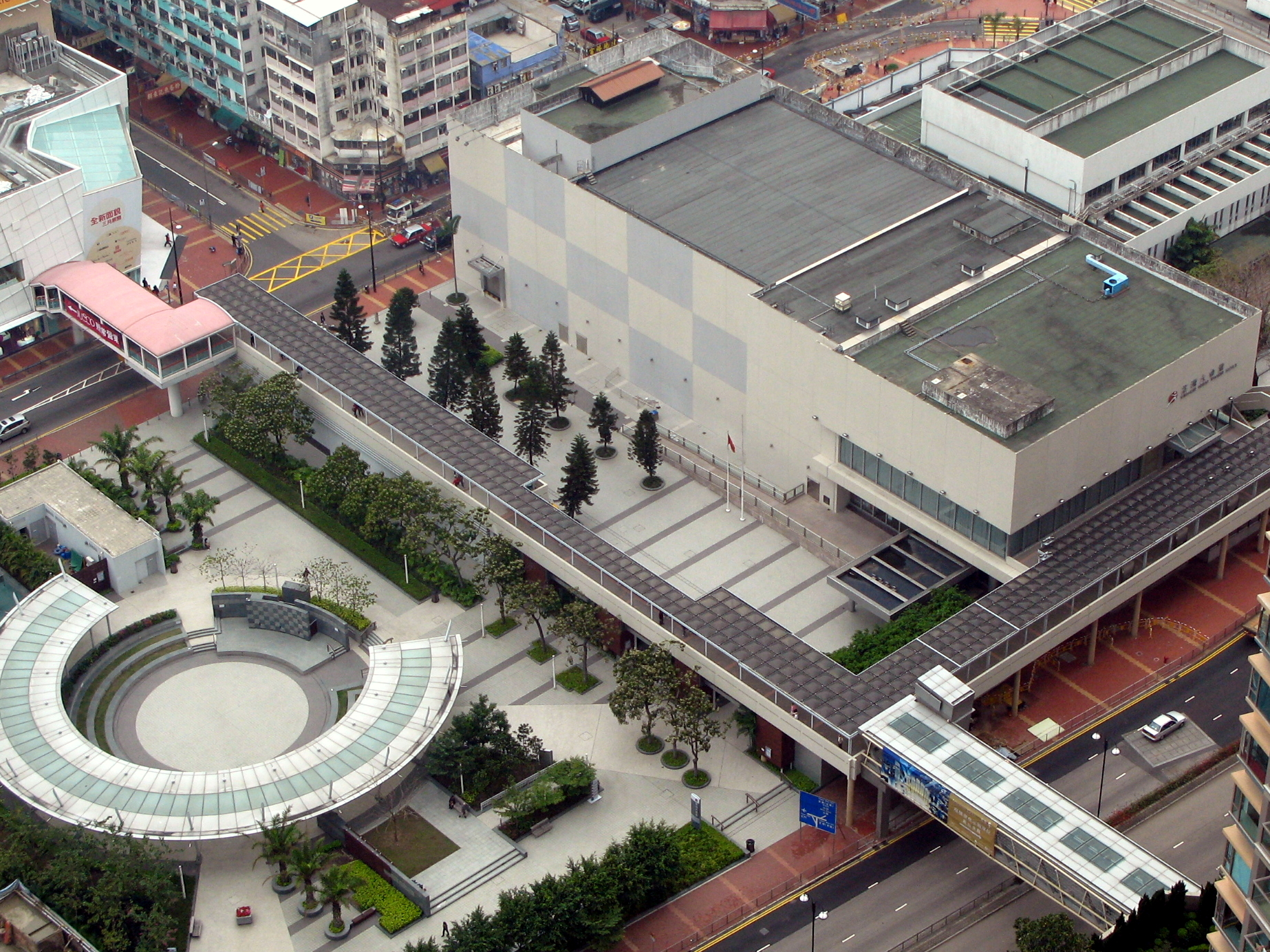
- Aerial view

- Location within Hong Kong

General information
- Status: Completed
- Type: Town hall
- Location: Tsuen Wan, New Territories
- Opened: 7 February 1980; 46 years ago
- Owner: Government of Hong Kong

Website
- Official website

Tsuen Wan Town Hall
- Traditional Chinese: 荃灣大會堂
- Simplified Chinese: 荃湾大会堂
Transcriptions
Standard Mandarin
- Hanyu Pinyin: Quánwān Dàhuìtáng
Yue: Cantonese
- Yale Romanization: Chyùhn wāan daaih wuih tòhng
- Jyutping: Cyun4 waan1 daai6 wui6 tong4

Tsuen Wan Town Hall is a town hall in Tsuen Wan, New Territories, Hong Kong. Originally it was intended to be located near Tsuen Wan station of the MTR, but it was re-located near the former Tsuen Wan Ferry Pier and Tsuen Wan Magistracy, between Tai Ho Road and Yuen Tun Circuit in late 1970s. The town hall was completed in 1980.

== History ==
The complex was built as part of the Tsuen Wan New Town project. It was officially opened by Princess Alexandra on 7 February 1980. Day-to-day operations were originally the responsibility of the Urban Services Department.

== Facilities ==
Its facilitates include: auditorium, cultural activities hall, exhibition gallery, conference room and lecture room.

The auditorium is the core of the town hall. With excellent acoustics design, it is often chosen by Hong Kong Philharmonic Orchestra for practising.

== Future ==
The government is considering consolidating several low-rise government buildings in Tsuen Wan, including the Tsuen Wan Town Hall, into a single high-rise. Local musicians have decried this news, as they consider the venue to be Hong Kong's best music hall from an acoustics standpoint, and do not want to see it demolished.

== See also ==
- Kwai Tsing Theatre – a similar venue in Kwai Chung, an adjacent district
