= Sai Wan Ho station =

MTR station on Hong Kong Island

Sai Wan Ho 西灣河
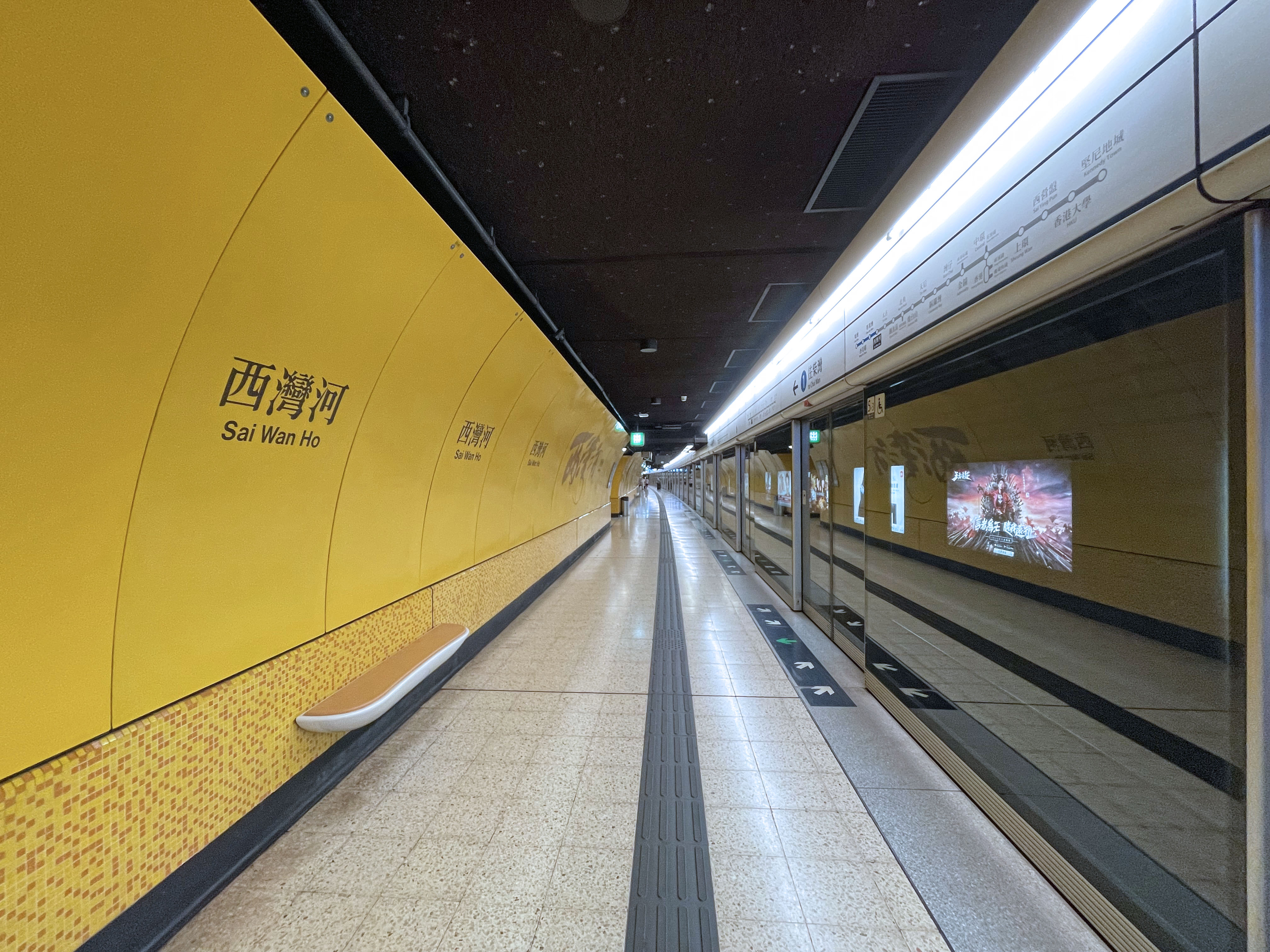
- Platform 1

Chinese name
- Traditional Chinese: 西灣河
- Simplified Chinese: 西湾河
- Hanyu Pinyin: Xīwānhé
- Cantonese Yale: Sāiwāanhó
- Literal meaning: Western bay river
Transcriptions
Standard Mandarin
- Hanyu Pinyin: Xīwānhé
Yue: Cantonese
- Yale Romanization: Sāiwāanhó
- Jyutping: Sai1waan1ho2

General information
- Location: Near Tai On Building, Shau Kei Wan Road, Sai Wan Ho; Eastern District, Hong Kong
- Coordinates: 22°16′54″N 114°13′21″E
- System: MTR rapid transit station
- Operator: MTR Corporation
- Line: Island line
- Platforms: 2 split-level side platforms
- Tracks: 2
- Connections: Tram; Ferry; Bus, minibus

Construction
- Structure type: Underground
- Platform levels: 2
- Accessible: Yes
- Architect: Yorke Rosenberg Mardall

Other information
- Station code: SWH

History
- Opened: 31 May 1985; 41 years ago

Services
Preceding station	MTR	Following station
Tai Koo towards Kennedy Town	Island line	Shau Kei Wan towards Chai Wan
Track layout
Location
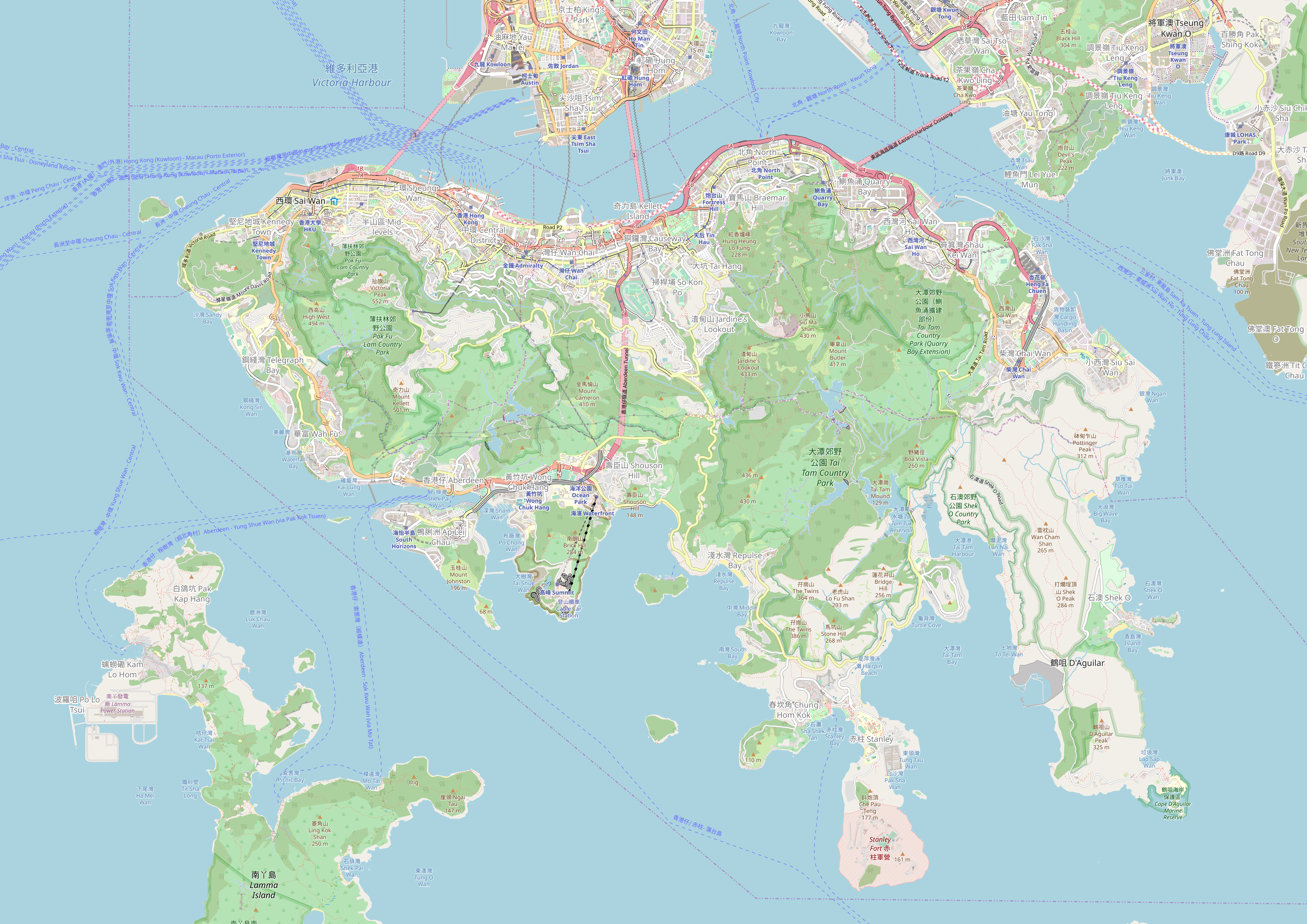
- Location within MTR Location within Hong Kong Island

Sai Wan Ho (Chinese: 西灣河; Cantonese Yale: Sāiwāanhó) is a station on the Hong Kong MTR Island line. It was opened on 31 May 1985. It is located under Shau Kei Wan Road in Sai Wan Ho in the Eastern District. Its livery is yellow.

== History ==
The site of the present-day station concourse was home to the old Sai Wan Ho Market, operated by the Urban Council, which was demolished to make way for the MTR station. Construction commenced in May 1982. The station was built under two interfacing construction contracts. The 7.6-metre-diameter station tunnels (which contain the platforms) were built by Nishimatsu Construction, a Japanese contractor, under particularly difficult geological conditions. The off-street station concourse was constructed by a joint venture formed by Gammon Construction, Kier, and a now-defunct Scottish contractor called Lilley. The concourse was constructed within diaphragm walls from the top down, and was designed to support a new Urban Council complex and residential estate (called Felicity Garden) above it.

Sai Wan Ho station opened on 31 May 1985 as part of the first phase of the Island line.

== Station layout ==
The platforms of Sai Wan Ho station are constructed in a stacked arrangement, with platform 2 above platform 1.

G	Ground level	Exits
L2	Concourse	Customer Service, MTRShops
L2	Concourse	Vending machines, ATM
L4; Upper Platform	Platform 2	Side platform, doors will open on the right
L4; Upper Platform	← Island line towards Kennedy Town (Tai Koo)
L5; Lower Platform	Platform 1	Side platform, doors will open on the left
L5; Lower Platform	Island line towards Chai Wan (Shau Kei Wan) →

=== Entrances and exits ===
- A: Tai On Street
- B: Shau Kei Wan Road
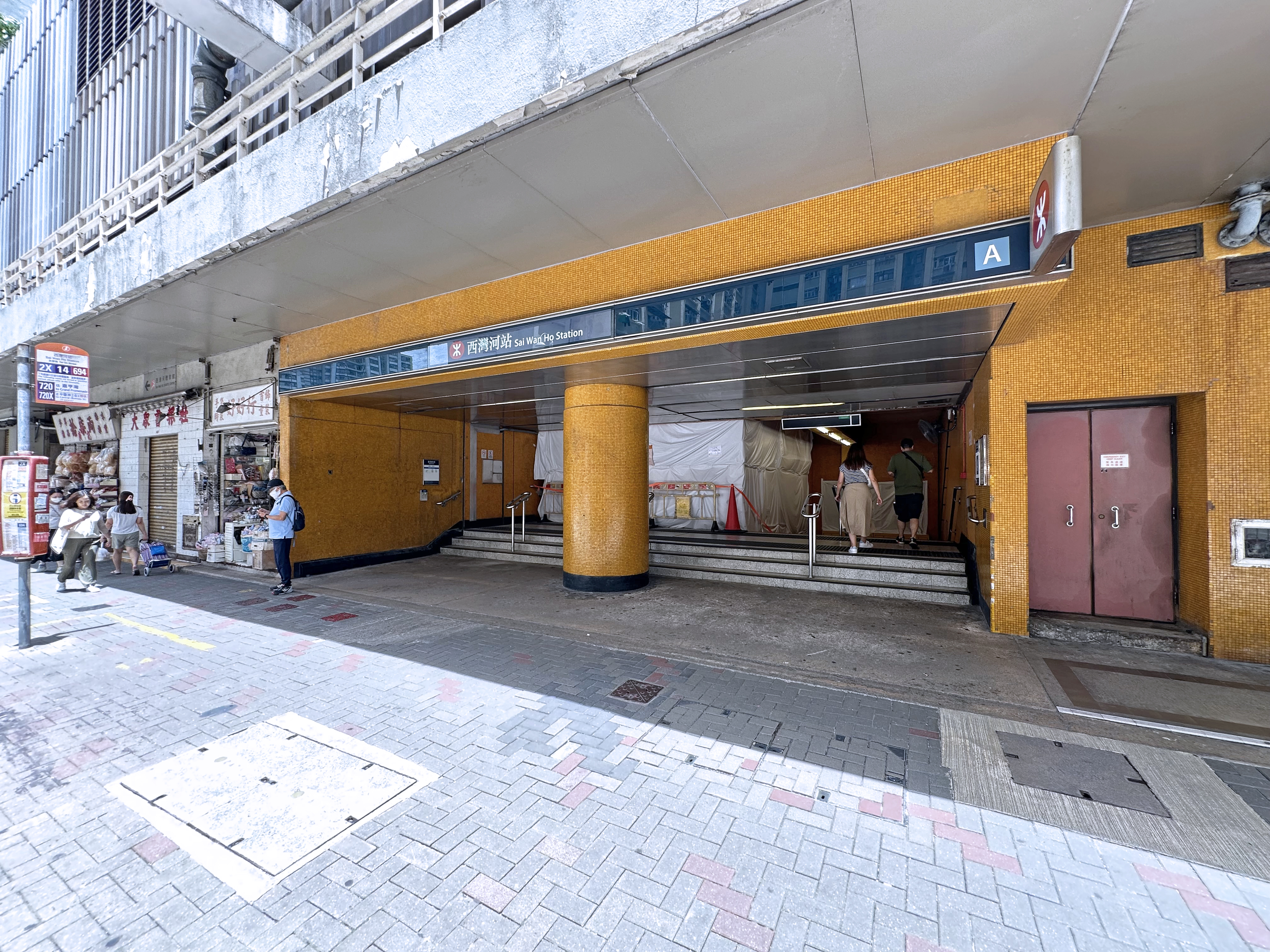
Exit A

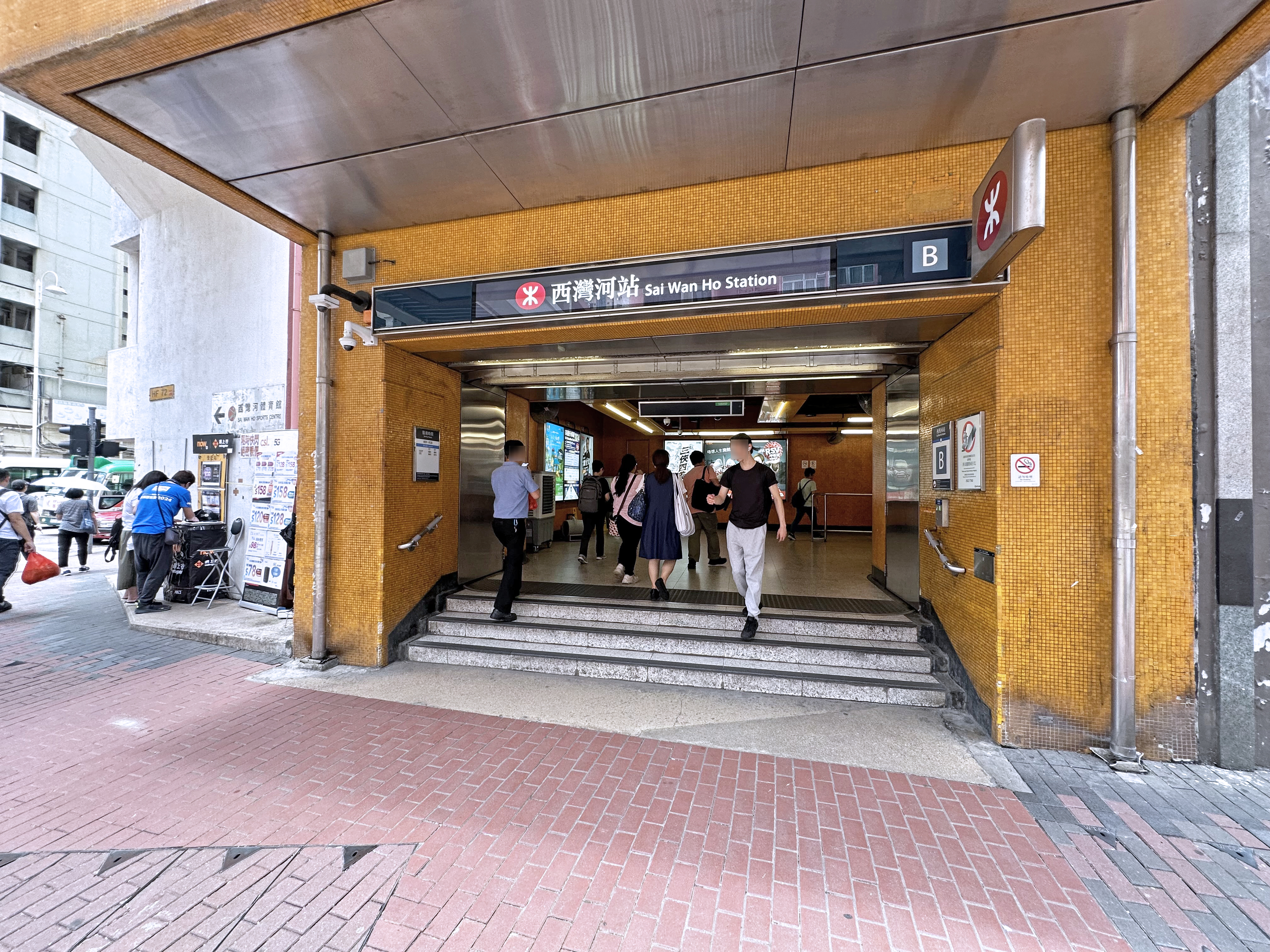
Exit B

== Gallery ==
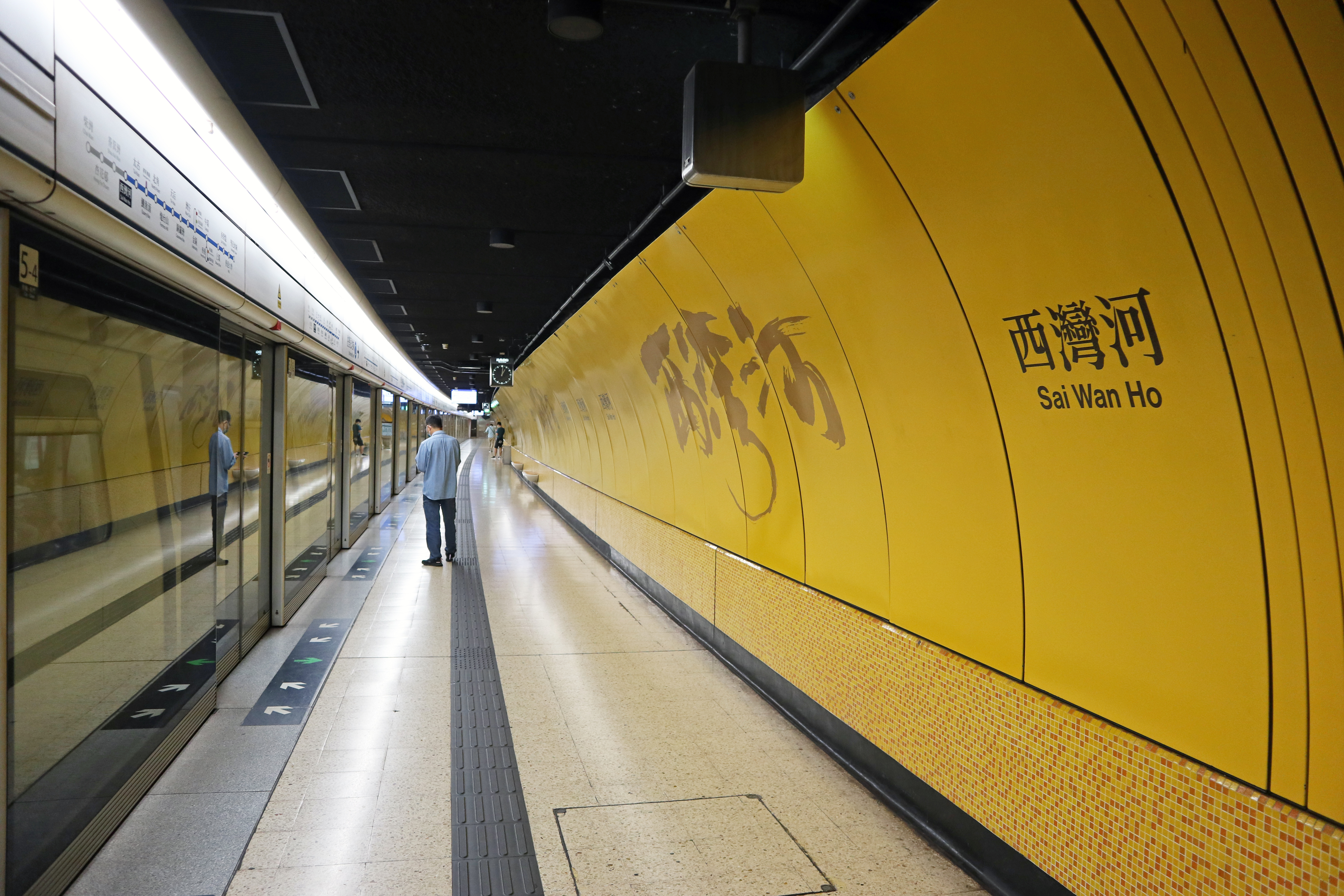
Platform 2

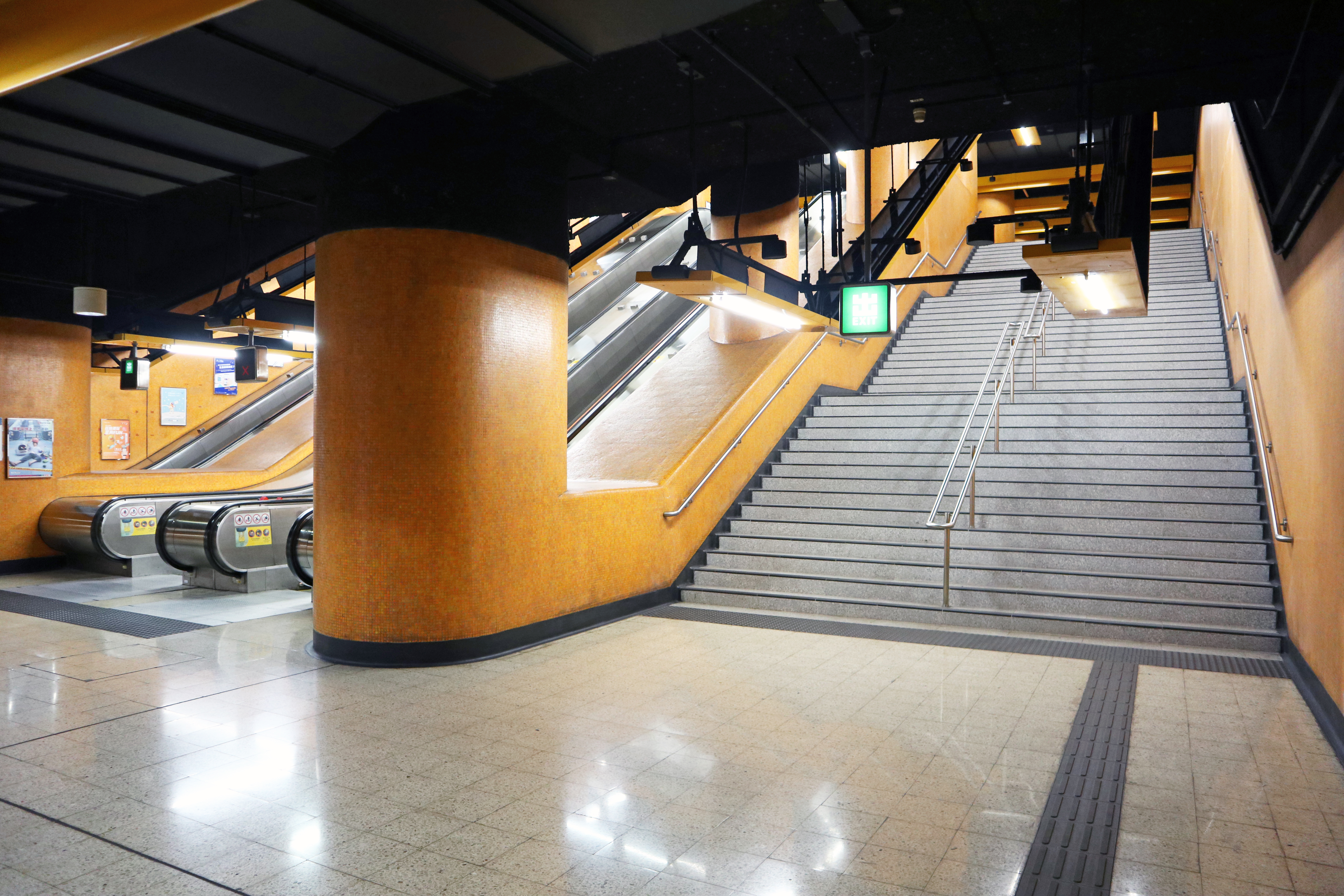
Escalators next to stairs

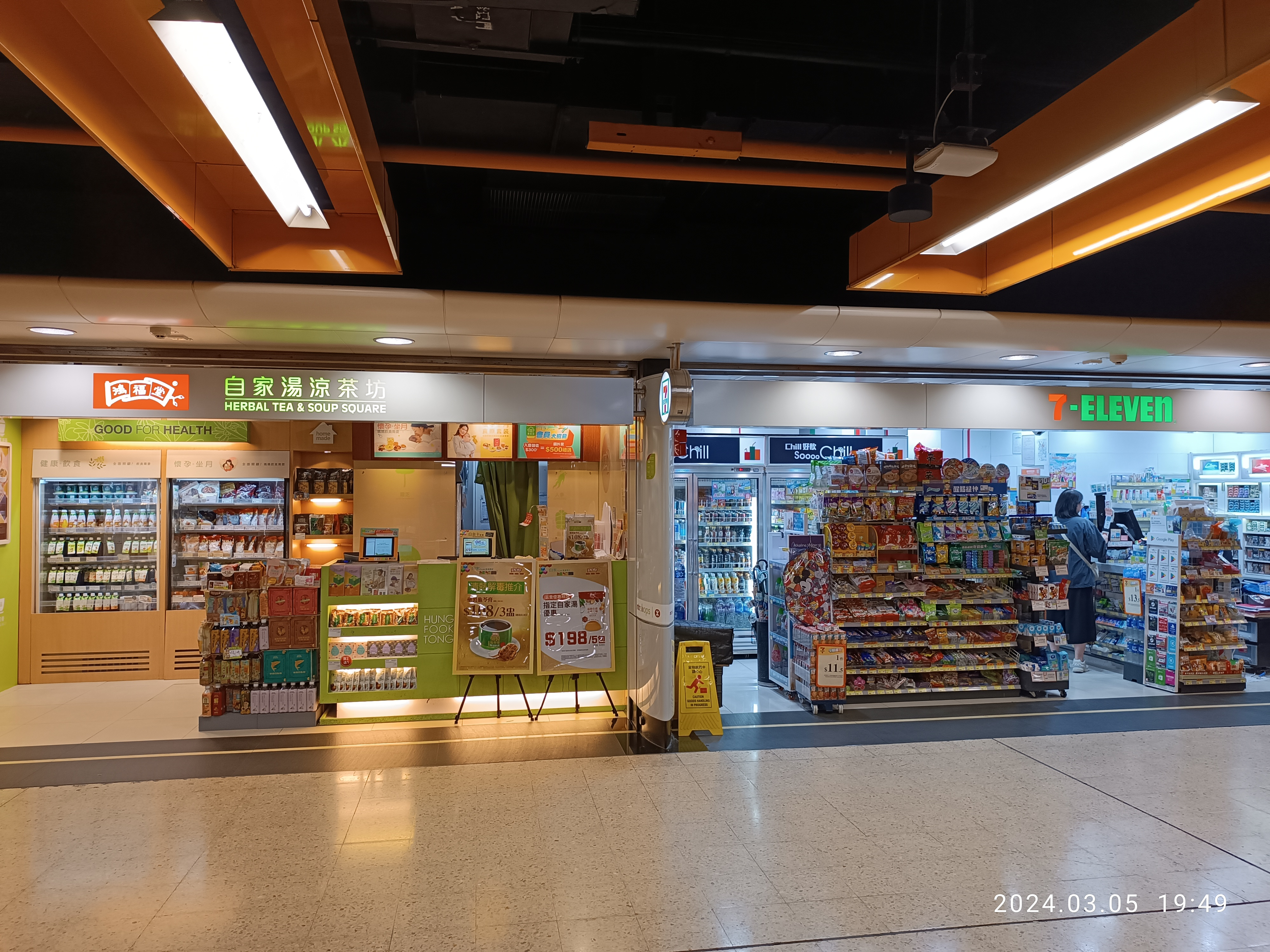
Shops

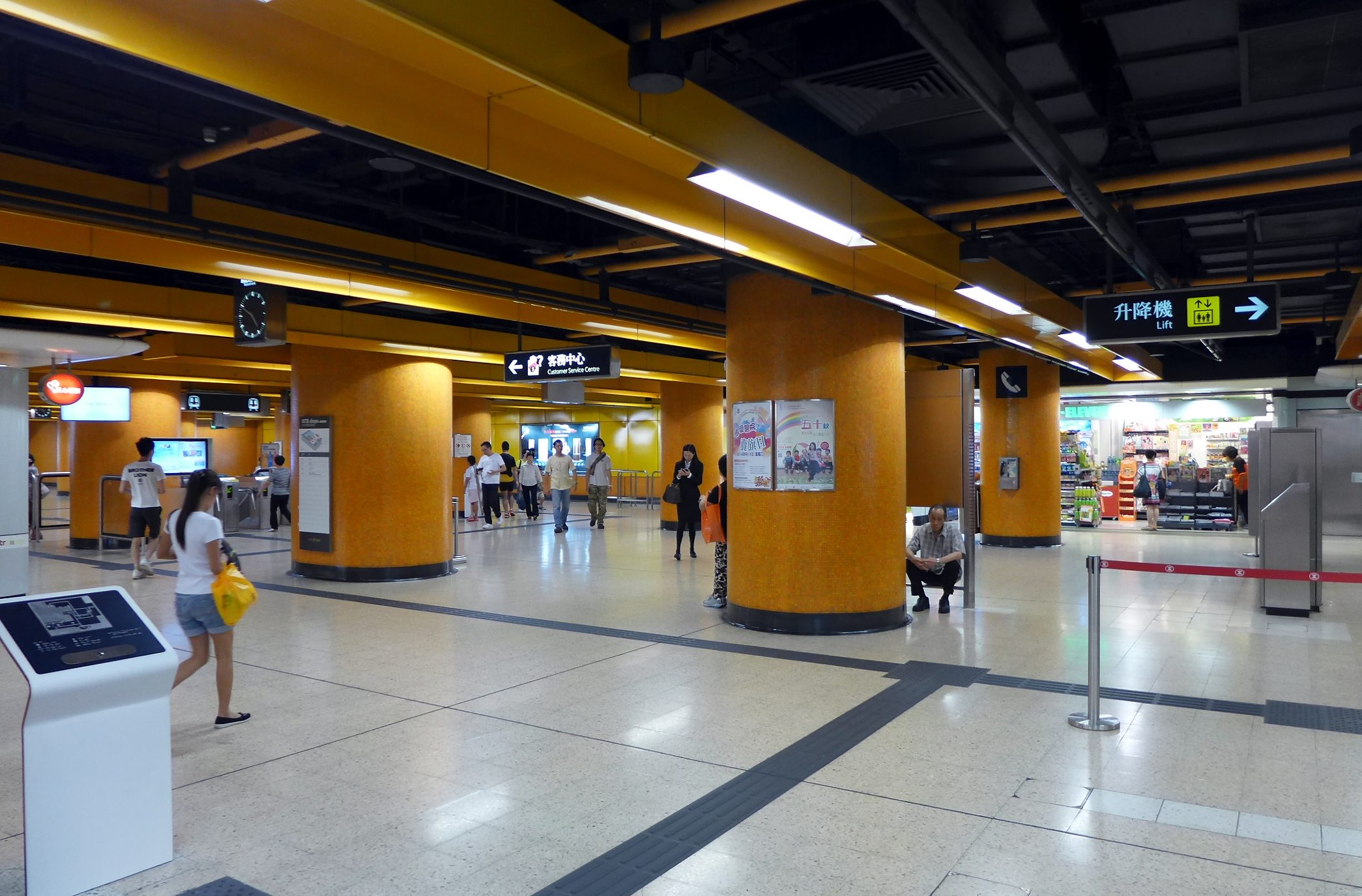
Concourse
