= Hong Kong Chinese Women's Club College =

Coordinates: 22.28387°N 114.21941°E

- 香港中國婦女會中學
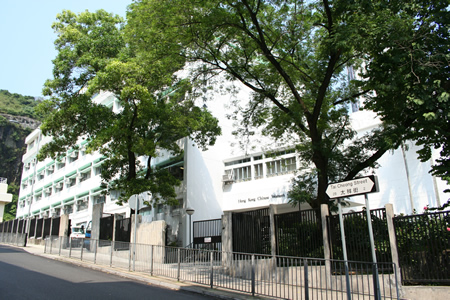

Location
- 2B Tai Cheong Street, Sai Wan Ho; Hong Kong; China

Information
- Type: government aided co-educational grammar school
- Motto: Knowledge and Perseverance (博學篤志)
- Established: 1 September 1978; 48 years ago
- School district: Eastern District, Hong Kong
- Principal: Mr. Yeung Chi Keung
- Grades: S.1 to S.6
- Age range: About 12 to 18
- Enrollment: About 1000
- Classes: 27
- Education system: 334 Scheme
- Language: English (MOI), Cantonese, Putonghua
- Houses: Ruby, Emerald, Sapphire, Topaz
- Information: 25684817 (phone); 25680336 (fax)
- Website: http://www.hkcwcc.edu.hk

Hong Kong Chinese Women's Club College is located in Sai Wan Ho in Hong Kong. It was founded on 1 September 1978 and Mr. Yeung Chi Keung is the current principal. The school uses English as the Medium of Instruction; it is an aided grammar school in Band 1A while the school motto is "Knowledge and Perseverance".

== School facilities ==
- 25 classrooms
- Four laboratories
  - Biology laboratory
  - Chemistry laboratory
  - Physics laboratory
  - Integrated science laboratory
- One playground
- Boys changing room
- Girls changing room
- CALC
- Student Activity Centre, SAC
- Two staff rooms
- English room
- Geography room
- Music room
- Computer room (classroom For S.6A)
- Art room
- Needlework room (classroom For S.6C)
- Home economics room
- Design and technology room
- Library
- G01
- Principal room
- Student association room
- Medicalroom
- Conference room
- Discipline room
- Tuck shop

== Extra-curricular activities ==
- English Club
- Chinese Club
- Chinese History Club
- Mathematics Club
- Computer Club
- Science Club
- Citizenship and Social Development Society
- Economics Society
- Geography Society
- History Club
- Tourism Club
- Business & Accounting Society
- Art Club
- Chess Club
- Chinese Debating Club
- Design & Technology Club
- Drama Club
- English Debating Club
- Home Economics Club
- Music Club
- Film Review & Appreciation Club
- Sports Society
  - Badminton Team
  - Dance Group
  - Basketball Team
  - Table Tennis Team
  - Athletics Team
  - Volleyball Team
  - Soccer Team
  - Indoor Rowing Team
  - Rope Skipping Group
- Boy Scouts
- Girl Guides
- Youth Red Cross
- Road Safety Patrol
- Campus TV Team
- CME Education Society
- Community Youth Club
- ECA Society
- Junior Police Call
- Life Planning Society
- Peer Guidance Society
- Photography Team
- Prefects' Association
- Service Learning
- Student Librarians' Club
- Christian Fellowship

== House ==
- There are four houses in this school which include Ruby, Topaz, Sapphire and Emerald.
- Students are divided into these four houses in F.1.
- Four houses will compete in numerous competitions.
- The Women's Club Cup will be handed to the club with the highest total score in numerous competitions in that academic year.

== Alumni ==
- Choi Yat-Git: Member of the famous Hong Kong band Grasshopper
- Yan Chi Hong (Jim): Famous DJ in Commercial Radio Hong Kong
- Chan Ka Kin: Winner of the first prize in the environmental management studies of 58th Intel International Science and Engineering Fair.
- Wing Shya: Famous photographer
- Holden Chow Ho-ding: Vice-chairperson of the Democratic Alliance for the Betterment and Progress of Hong Kong
- Yang Sze Ngai (Raymond): Co-founder of "JUST FEEL", a charitable organization promoting socio-emotional education

== Neighborhood ==
- Sai Wan Ho Fire Station
- Shau Kei Wan Police Station
