= Munsang College (Hong Kong Island) =

- 港島民生書院
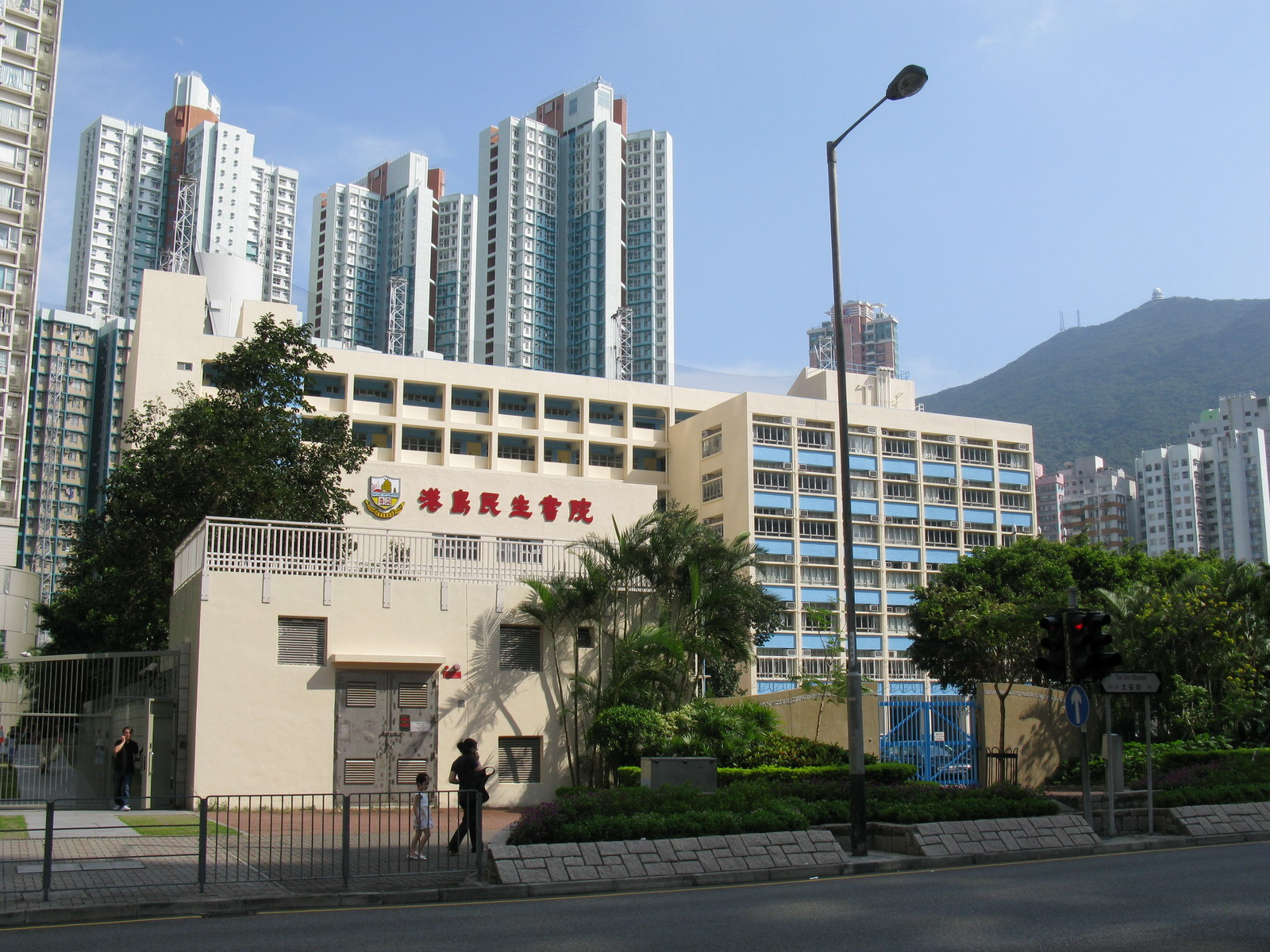

Location
- 26 Tai On Street; Sai Wan Ho; Hong Kong
- Coordinates: 22.28295°N 114.22442°E

Information
- Type: Aided, co-educational
- Motto: Light and Life; All for One, One for All
- Religious affiliations: Protestantism; Christianity
- Established: 1999; 27 years ago
- School district: Eastern District
- President: Wong Kui-hung Jeremiah
- Principal: Yim Chi-shing
- Staff: 64
- Grades: Form 1–Form 6
- Enrollment: 802 (2020–21)
- Campus size: 75,350 sq ft (7,000 m^{2})
- Houses: Isaiah, Moses, Samuel, Caleb (Chinese: 正、謙、誠、勇)
- Colour
- Affiliation: Munsang College School Sponsoring Body
- Website: www.imsc.edu.hk

Munsang College
- Traditional Chinese: 港島民生書院
- Simplified Chinese: 港岛民生书院
Transcriptions
Standard Mandarin
- Hanyu Pinyin: Gǎngdǎo Mínshēng Shūyuàn
Yue: Cantonese
- Jyutping: gong2 dou2 man4 sang1 syu1 jyun6*2

Munsang College (Hong Kong Island) (IMSC, Chinese: 港島民生書院) is a top-ranked Christian secondary school located in Sai Wan Ho, Hong Kong. Established in 1999 by the Munsang College Education Council, it operates independently from the Munsang College in Kowloon. The college is named after the two founders of Munsang College, Au Tak and Mok Kon-sang.

Since the 2010–11 academic year, the college has been using English as the medium of instruction for all subjects excluding Chinese language, Chinese history, Putonghua, and religious education (Christianity). The college has had a Student Association since September 2008.
