= List of schools in Eastern District, Hong Kong =

This is a list of schools in Eastern District, Hong Kong.

== Secondary schools ==
Government

- Belilios Public School
- Clementi Secondary School
- Shau Kei Wan East Government Secondary School
- Shau Kei Wan Government Secondary School

Aided

- Canossa College
- Caritas Chai Wan Marden Foundation Secondary School (明愛柴灣馬登基金中學)
- CCC Kwei Wah Shan College (中華基督教會桂華山中學)
- Cheung Chuk Shan College
- Chong Gene Hang College (張振興伉儷書院)
- CNEC Lau Wing Sang Secondary School (中華傳道會劉永生中學)
- Cognitio College (Hong Kong) (文理書院（香港）)
- Fortress Hill Methodist Secondary School
- Fukien Secondary School (Siu Sai Wan) (福建中學（小西灣）)
- Henrietta Secondary School
- Hong Kong Chinese Women's Club College
- Islamic Kasim Tuet Memorial College
- Lingnan Hang Yee Memorial Secondary School (嶺南衡怡紀念中學)
- Lingnan Secondary School
- Man Kiu College (閩僑中學)
- Methodist Church HK Wesley College (衞理中學)
- Munsang College (Hong Kong Island)
- Precious Blood Secondary School
- Salesian English School
- SKH Li Fook Hing Secondary School (聖公會李福慶中學)
- St Joan of Arc Secondary School
- St Mark's School

Direct Subsidy Scheme

- Hon Wah College (漢華中學)
- Kiangsu-Chekiang College, International Section
- Pui Kiu Middle School
- The Chinese Foundation Secondary School

Private

- Carmel School
- Chinese International School
- DSC International School (德思齊加拿大國際學校)
- Grace Christian Academy (培生學校)
- Invictus Secondary School
- Korean International School of Hong Kong

== Primary schools ==
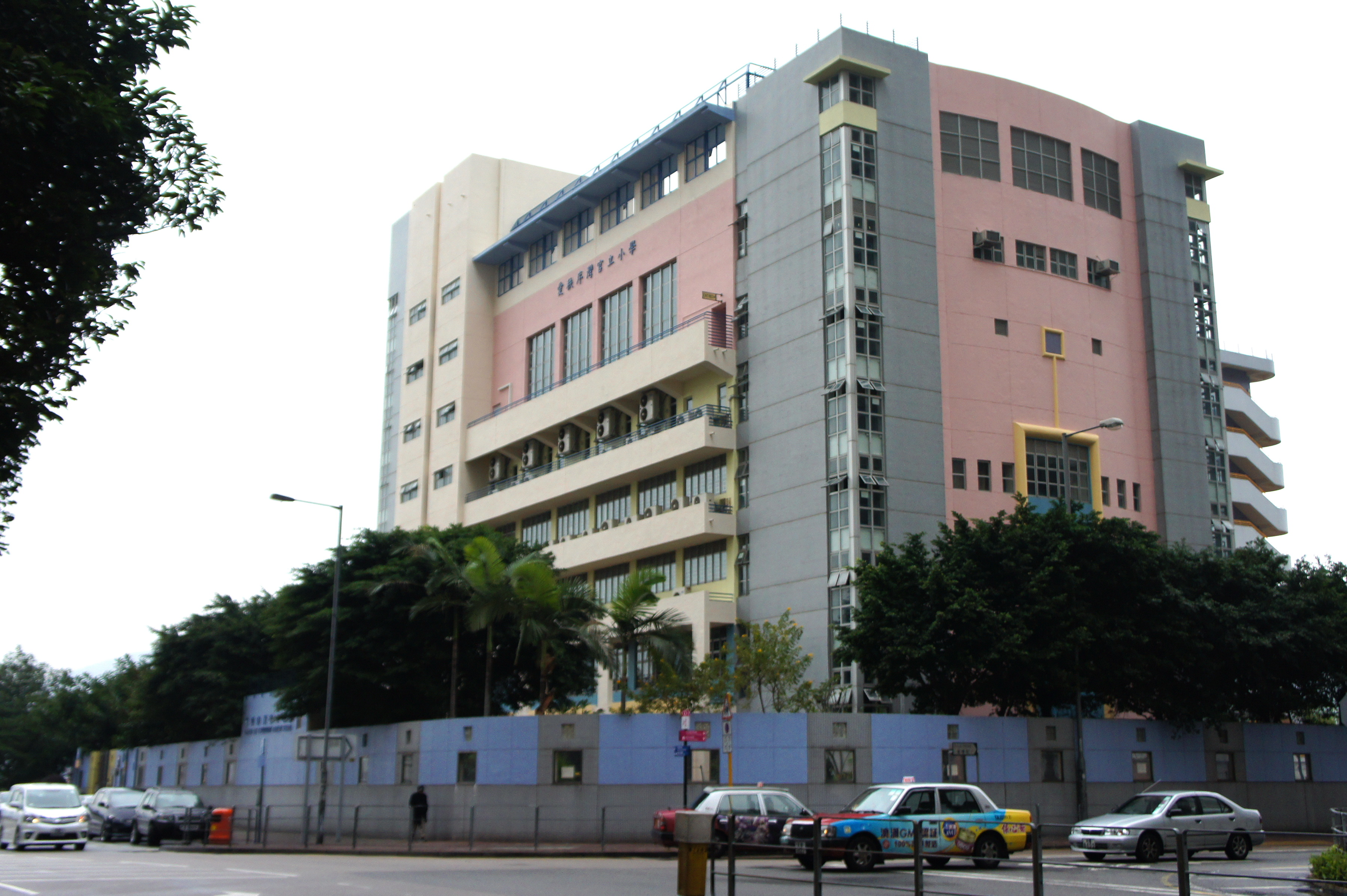
Aldrich Bay Government Primary School

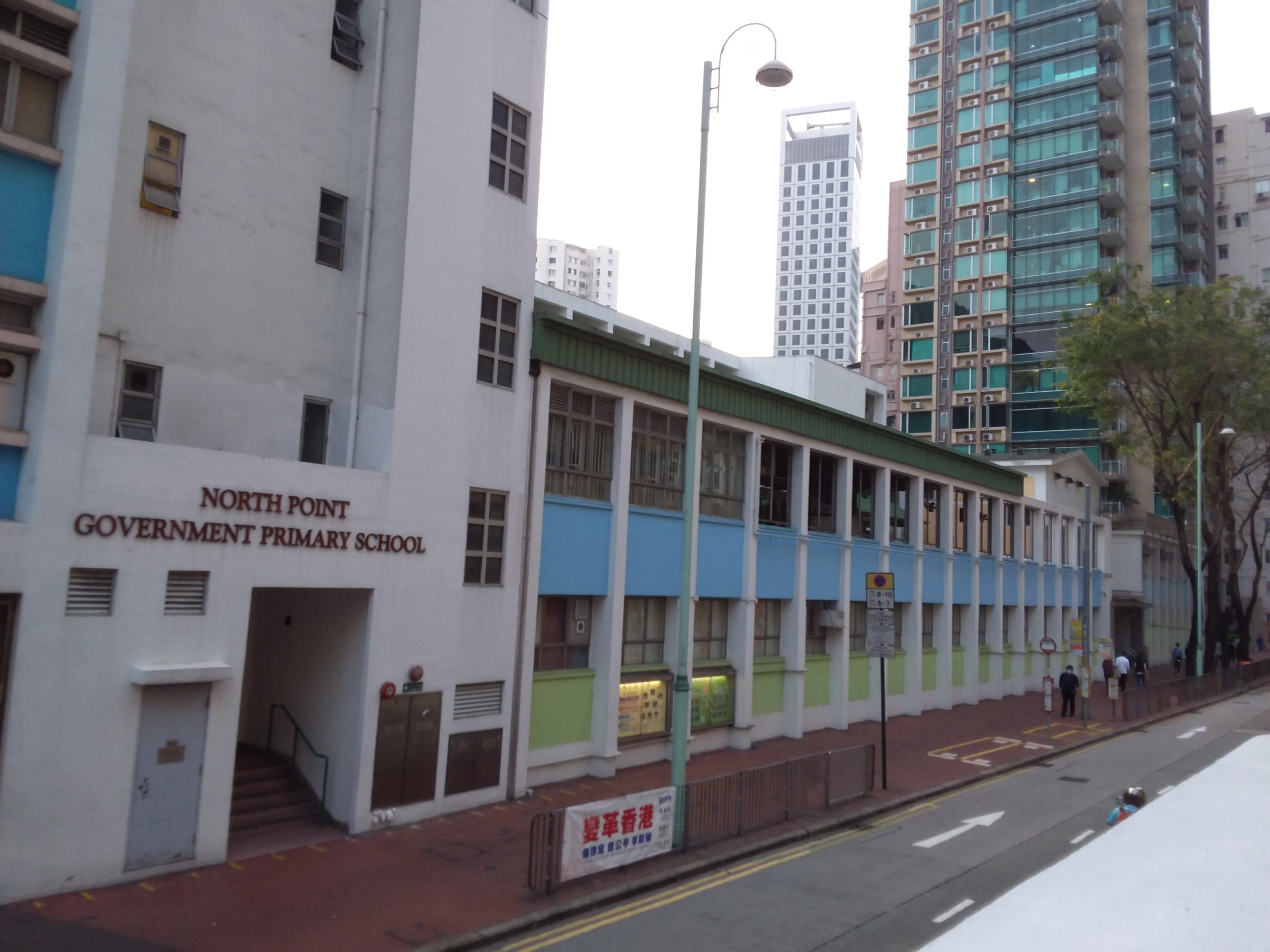
North Point Government Primary School

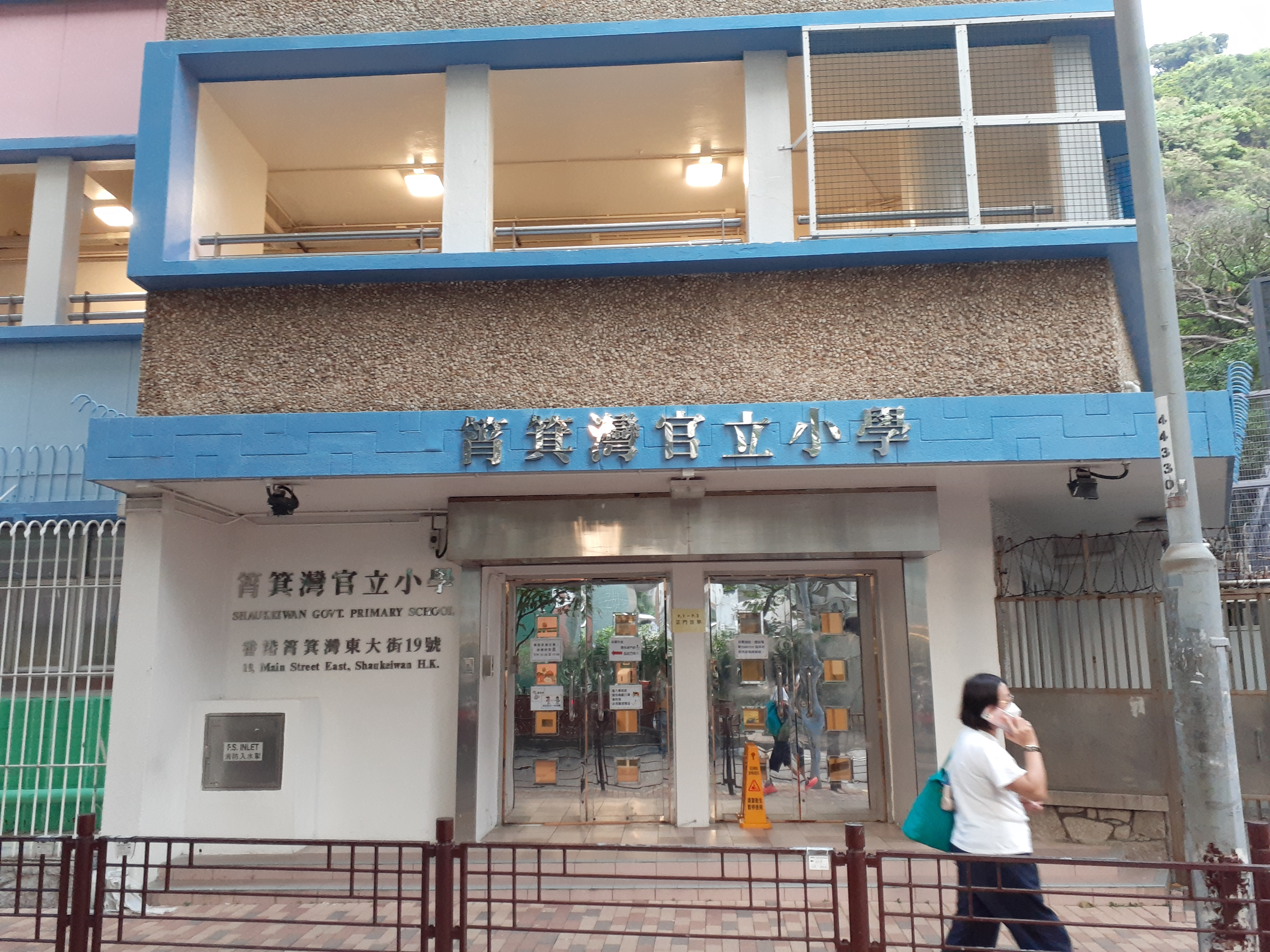
Shau Kei Wan Government Primary School

Government

- Aldrich Bay Government Primary School (愛秩序灣官立小學)
- North Point Government Primary School (北角官立小學)
- Shau Kei Wan Government Primary School (筲箕灣官立小學)

Aided

- Buddhist Chung Wah Kornhill Primary School (佛教中華康山學校)
- Canossa School (Hong Kong) (香港嘉諾撒學校
- CCC Kei Wan Primary School (中華基督教會基灣小學)
- CCC Kei Wan Primary School (Aldrich Bay) (中華基督教會基灣小學（愛蝶灣）)
- Chan's Creative School (Hong Kong Island) (啓基學校（港島）)
- Chinese Methodist School (North Point) (北角循道學校)
- Chinese Methodist School, Tanner Hill (丹拿山循道學校)
- ELCHK Faith Love Lutheran School (基督教香港信義會信愛學校)
- The Endeavourers Leung Lee Sau Yu Memorial Primary School (勵志會梁李秀娛紀念小學)
- The H.K.C.W.C. Hioe Tjo Yoeng Primary School (香港中國婦女會丘佐榮學校)
- Meng Tak Catholic School (天主教明德學校)
- North Point Methodist Primary School (北角衞理小學)
- Pui Kiu Primary School (培僑小學)
- Pun U Association Wah Yan Primary School (番禺會所華仁小學)
- S.K.H. Chai Wan St Michael's Primary School (聖公會柴灣聖米迦勒小學)
- Sa Ann Wyllie Memorial School (救世軍韋理夫人紀念學校)
- Salesian School (慈幼學校)
- Salvation Army Centaline Charity Fund School (救世軍中原慈善基金學校)
- Shanghai Alumni Primary School (滬江小學)
- Shaukiwan Tsung Tsin School (筲箕灣崇真學校)
- SKH St Michael's Primary School (聖公會聖米迦勒小學)
- Taikoo Primary School (太古小學)

English Schools Foundation

- Quarry Bay School

Private

- Carmel School
- Chinese International School
- DSC International School
- French International School of Hong Kong Chai Wan Campus
- Grace Christian Academy
- Kiangsu & Chekiang Primary School (蘇浙小學校)
- Korean International School of Hong Kong

== Special schools ==
Aided

- Caritas Lok Yi School (明愛樂義學校)
- Hong Kong Red Cross Hospital Schools Pamela Youde Nethersole Eastern Hospital (香港紅十字會醫院學校)
- PLK Yu Lee Mo Fan Memorial School (保良局余李慕芬紀念學校)
- RCHK Island West Hong Chi Morninghope School (香港西區扶輪社匡智晨輝學校)

== Former schools ==
Government

- Java Road Government Primary School

Private

- Hong Kong Japanese School Secondary Section In April 2018 the junior high school moved to the Happy Valley campus.
