= Braemar Hill murders =

1985 murders of 2 teenagers in British Hong Kong

Nicola Myers and Kenneth McBride in 1985

The Braemar Hill murders (Chinese: 寶馬山雙屍案) occurred in British Hong Kong on 20 April 1985, when local British teenagers Kenneth McBride and Nicola Myers were killed by a group of five young gangsters on Braemar Hill, Hong Kong. McBride was found bound, beaten, and strangled with over 100 bodily injuries. Myers' body was found half naked, her jaw broken, and her left eyeball out of its socket. Evidence also showed that Myers was raped.

== Background ==
Kenneth McBride (aged 17) and Nicola Myers (aged 18), a teenaged couple, were both students at Island School and were well known on campus. McBride was the president of the students' union, captain of the school rowing team, and a member of the debate team. His former teacher Chris Forse described him as smart, and loved by the school community. Myers was described as a smart student, who had an interest in languages and was hoping to become an interpreter. Simon Boyde, a former schoolmate of the couple, said that they were close, and both of them were popular in school.

== Murder ==
On the afternoon of the attack, McBride and Myers decided to take a walk in the Braemar Hill countryside, part of the Tai Tam Country Park, located near McBride's residence at Braemar Hill Mansions. They were seated on a remote and quiet pathway on the hillside, studying for their A Level examinations. Earlier the same day, a group of five local triad members: Pang Shun-yee (彭信義; Péng Xìnyì; paang4 seon3 ji6) age 24, Tam Sze-foon (譚士歡; Tán Shìhuān; taam4 si6 fun1) age 20, Chiu Wai-man (趙偉文; Zhào Wěiwén; ziu6 wai5 man4) age 25, Cheung Yau-hang (張有恆; Zhāng Yǒuhéng; zoeng1 jau5 hang4) age 17, and Won Sam-lung (尹三龍; Yǐn Sānlóng; wan5 saam1 lung4) age 16, were gathered in the area. According to Won's evidence, Pang was the leader of the group, and he suggested they steal a cable from the government aerial station on the mountain for some extra cash.

After several failed attempts to steal the cable, the group spotted McBride and Myers. The group decided to "have some fun" and thought as the teenagers were European they must be rich. Pang led them to rob the couple. McBride and Myers only had one dollar on them, angering the gangsters and triggering the attack. McBride was bound and savagely beaten. Tam pulled off McBride's Nike shoes and kept them after the murder, leading to the shoes becoming key pieces of evidence presented in court. According to the murderers' statements, Pang verbally threatened the rest of the gang to take part in the attack. Pang raped Myers while the other four members were brutally beating McBride. Myers' genitalia were penetrated by a stick and a bottle. After several attacks, Pang decided to murder the couple to prevent later identification. The group left the country park after the murders, and destroyed the couple's textbooks.

== Investigation ==
Relatives of McBride and Myers realised they were missing when they failed to return home that night. The family searched for the couple, and phoned the Royal Hong Kong Police after failing to locate them. The next day, the couple's bodies were discovered by a morning jogger. The murders shocked the city and the police mounted a thorough investigation. More than 800 policemen and several personnel from the British Forces Overseas Hong Kong were sent to search the crime scene. Police discovered some wooden sticks that they suspected were used as weapons. Torn exercise books were also found along the hillside. Traces of semen were found on Myer's body as well as partial fingerprints on the torn books and the sticks. However, due to the infancy of forensic science at that time, insufficient evidence was found to trace the murderer(s).

The police interviewed more than 10,000 people who lived around the area, as well as known triad members, but nothing was found. The crime shocked the community, especially as the murders involved two expats being killed, which was extremely rare. A few months after the murders, an anonymous Hong Kong businessman donated HK$500,000 to the Royal Hong Kong Police, as a reward for anyone with sufficient information about the murders. An anonymous triad member contacted the police, suggesting some unusual activity by one of their members, Pang, might show he was involved in the offence.

== Arrest, trial, and imprisonment ==
In late November the police arrested Pang and the rest of the group within 48 hours. Although they had given details of the murders, only Won pleaded guilty and served as a prosecution witness. All five of the assailants were found guilty by Judge Lee Frost and convicted on 18 January 1987 at the Court of First Instance, by a unanimous vote. During the trial, Pang's lawyer Malcolm Poon stated that Pang suffered from depressive disorder and borderline personality disorder, a testimony denied by Frost. Pang, Tam and Chiu were sentenced to death, later commuted to life imprisonment in 1993 under permission given by the Governor-in-Council. In passing down sentence, Frost described Pang, Tam and Chiu as "cold-blooded" and "great liars". Pang and Chiu remain in prison, at Kam Heu Correctional Institution in Yuen Long. Tam died of cancer in prison in 2009 at the age of 45. The other two killers, Cheung and Won (both born in 1968), were underage at the time of the crime and were sentenced to be detained at Her Majesty's pleasure at a juvenile prison.

After the transfer of sovereignty over Hong Kong in 1997, the law required Chief Executive Tung Chee Hwa to determine the terms of Won and Cheung. Won's parents appealed to the McBride and Myers families for forgiveness for Won. In 1998, the families announced that they have forgiven Won, and appealed to Tung for a lesser sentence. Tung agreed, and decided that Won would be incarcerated for 27 years and Cheung for a minimum of 30 years. Won would later say upon release from Stanley Prison in 2004, in front of the press, that receiving forgiveness was both touching and hard to accept, and that he would use the opportunity to reintegrate fully back into society. He was later offered clerical work in a law firm through the government's Criminal Rehabilitation Service.

With a change in law in 2004, Cheung's prison term was to be redetermined by the court. In 2005, his sentence was converted to a sentence of 35 years in prison. Later, Cheung appealed to the court for a lesser sentence similar to Won's, but on 6 April 2006 the verdict came down denying Cheung's request, citing that due to the heinous nature of the crime, 35 years for Cheung was more than generous. He was released in December 2007, and was later hired as an inspection worker at a public utility.

== Killers ==
Prior to the crime, most of the killers had no criminal records beyond misdemeanors. Cheung was abandoned by his family at age four, and left at an orphanage at age six. As a teenager, he was taken back in by his abusive father. Cheung dropped out of school at 14, subsequently working menial jobs in restaurants and opening taxi doors. Upon losing his job, he was disowned by his father, and was wandering the streets when he was recruited by Pang. Won was a cook at a local restaurant. The leader of the group, Pang, was a casual worker and a low-level member of the Fuk Yee Hing (福義興) triad society. He was reputed as a bully and a thug.

== Aftermath ==
Island School, together with family and friends of the couple, established the Nicola Myers and Kenneth McBride Memorial Fund in memory of the couple, to support disadvantaged school children in Hong Kong for further education. McBride's parents have since moved back to their home country of Scotland.

The 1992 Hong Kong film Suburb Murder has a storyline that is based loosely on the Braemar Hill murders. The 2001 film From the Queen to the Chief Executive (Chinese: 等候董建華發落; lit. 'at Tung Chee-hwa's pleasure') is based on one of the suspects' pleas for amnesty before and after Hong Kong's handover.
