= Man Kiu College =

Man Kiu College 閩僑中學
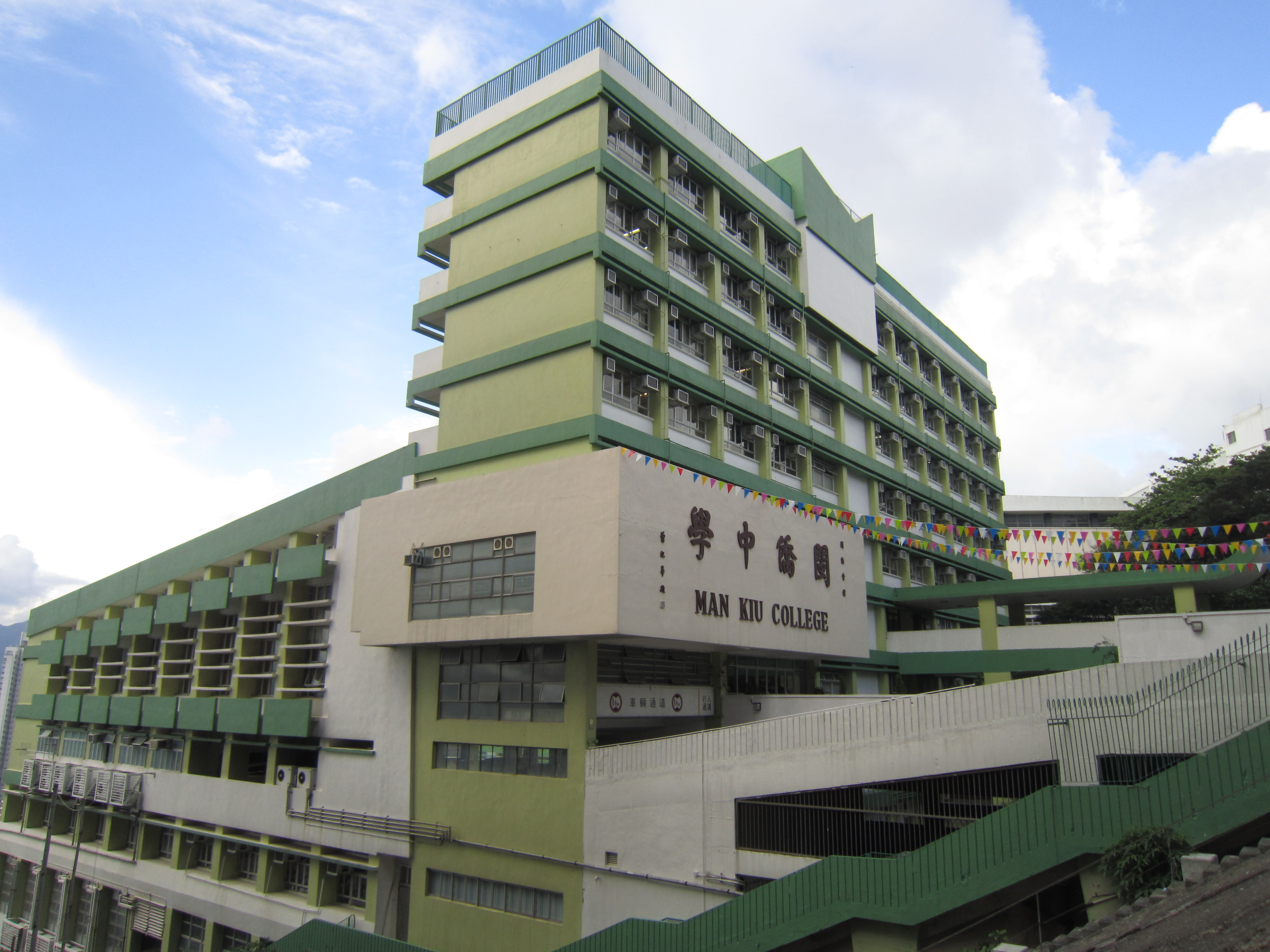
- Man Kiu College

Location
- 81 Cloud View Road, North Point, Eastern District, Hong Kong
- Coordinates: 22°17′14″N 114°11′59″E

Information
- School type: Subsidized Secondary Schools
- Motto: 孝、悌、忠、信
- Established: 1977
- School district: Eastern District
- President: 彭志遠先生
- Grades: Form 1 to Form 6
- Campus size: 70,000 sq ft
- Website: https://www.mkc.edu.hk

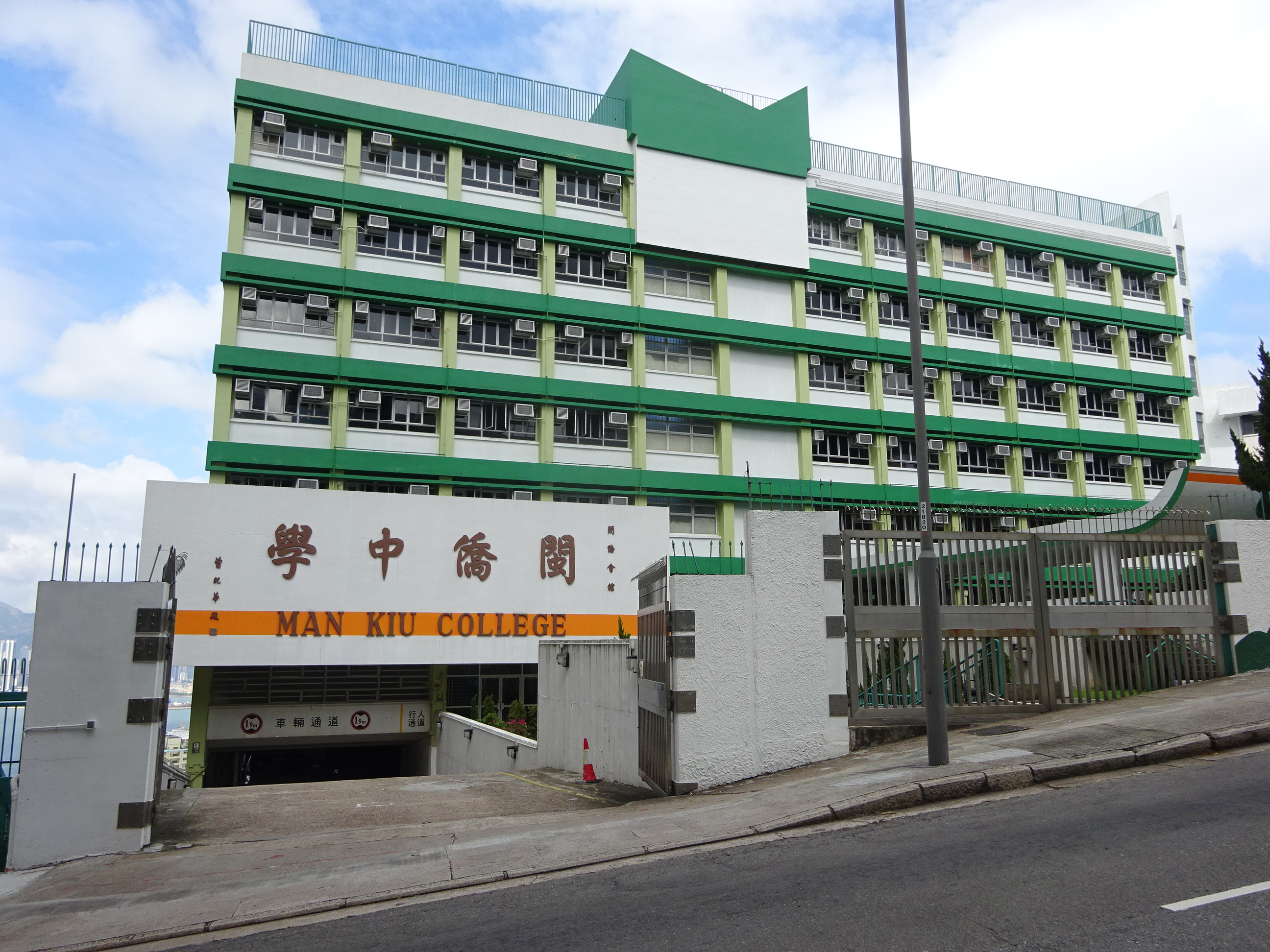
Front of Man Kiu College

Man Kiu College（中文：閩僑中學）is located 81 Cloud View Road, North Point, Hong Kong. It was founded by the Hong Kong Hokkien Association in 1977 and is a subsidized full-day co-educational secondary school.Starting from the 2023/24 academic year, the school will stop enrolling Form 1 students and won't longer participate in the secondary school place allocation method. It will change its school operation model.

== History ==
As early as 1970, enthusiastic responses to the school fundraising campaign came from Fujianese community leaders and prominent figures in the Philippines, Hong Kong, Singapore, and Taiwan, which made the establishment of the school possible. The school's anthem was lyrics-written by renowned scholar Professor Jao Tsung-I. The school has established various support measures, including the "Man Kiu Star Scholarship" and the "Man Kiu College Star Scholarship."

In August 1977, the school building was completed, and classes officially began in September of the same year. It was initially a private non-profit-making secondary school subsidised by the government on a per-place basis, offering only Forms 1 to 3. In August 1986, the school accepted an invitation from the Education Department to transform into a fully government-funded secondary school. From the 1985–86 academic year onwards, it offered Forms 1 to 7, becoming a complete grammar school.

In 1986, the School Management Committee began actively preparing for campus expansion, planning to add one floor to each of the two wings of the school building, providing seven additional classrooms, a library, and a study room. The expansion project was made possible by a donation and strong support from the school supervisor, Dr. Aw Sian, as well as fundraising walks involving students and teachers.

Subsequently, the school received government funding for improvement works. The first phase was completed in August 2002, including the construction of additional staff rooms, a staff lounge, and a student activity centre. The second phase was completed in June 2003, adding a computer-assisted teaching room, a language laboratory, a multi-purpose learning room, a Student Union office, and a lift.

In 2021, a gymnasium was successfully added, and interactive touchscreen electronic whiteboards were installed in classrooms.

Due to insufficient enrolment in the 2021–22 academic year, the school underwent a special inspection by the Education Bureau but was deemed not up to standard. Subsequently, the school switched to a per-place government subsidy model for Form 1. On 11 July 2023, the school announced that it would stop enrolling Form 1 students from the new academic year and would no longer participate in the Secondary School Places Allocation System, planning to change its mode of operation.

== School campus ==
The Man Kiu College campus is located on Mount Butler, offering a panoramic view of Victoria Harbour from the mid-levels of North Point, with a distant view of Lion Rock in Kowloon across the harbour. Surrounded by lush greenery, the campus environment is tranquil. The school building is ten storeys high, divided into east and west wings. It occupies a site area of 70,000 square feet (6,500 m^{2}) and has 30 classrooms.

== List of principals ==
Tenure	Principal
1977–1981	Tang Chung-tai
1981–1982	Kwong Sun-fong
1982–1984	So Chung-tak
1984–2011	Ren Choi Oi-yi
2011–2015	Lai Kiu-kuen
2015–2016	Dr. Law Wai-kam
2016–2018	Dr. Chow Fu-hung
2018–2021	Dr. Law Wai-kam
2021	Lam Ching-ning (Acting)
2022–present	Pang Chi-yuen

Honorary Advisor to the Incorporated Management Committee: Dr. Bernard Chan, GBM, GBS, JP

== Notable alumni ==
- Wong Yuk (Chinese: 黃旭), former Professor at The Hong Kong Polytechnic University; currently Associate Dean (Research and Postgraduate Studies) and Chair Professor of Marketing at the School of Business, Hong Kong Baptist University; Visiting Professor at Griffith University, Australia; Distinguished Professor at Shanghai University of Finance and Economics (under the "Oriental Scholar" Scheme)
- Ngai To (Chinese: 魏濤), Assistant Dean (Research) of the Faculty of Science and Professor in the Department of Chemistry at The Chinese University of Hong Kong; Fellow of the Royal Society of Chemistry (FRSC); recipient of the Croucher Foundation Scholarship, CUHK Faculty Exemplary Teaching Award, Outstanding Research Award, and Young Scholar Research Achievement Award
- Tse Tsz-ho (Chinese: 謝子豪), Associate Professor at the College of Engineering, University of Georgia, USA; Director of the Medical Robotics Laboratory; Croucher Foundation Visiting Scholar; Vice Chairman of the Harvard Medical School Chinese Expert Scholars Association
- Sunny Chan (Chinese: 陳仕燊), vocalist of the bands Supper Moment and Tim Lui (Form 5 graduate, 2005)
- Hong Ling-leng (Chinese: 康梓泠), novelist and essayist; author of the biography of Chung King-fai, titled Wide, Pure and Clear: Chung King-fai
- Alan Li (Chinese: 李任燊), Hong Kong actor
- Ching Yiu (Chinese: 程瑤), Chairperson of the YHAC Charity Organization; Director of Stage Production and Communications Limited; awarded the World Outstanding Young Chinese Entrepreneur Award by the World Chinese Business Investment Foundation in 2017
