= Kwong Fuk Yee =

Chemist and professor of the Chinese University of Hong Kong

Kwong Fuk-yee (Chinese: 鄺福兒) is the chairman of the Department of Chemistry at the Chinese University of Hong Kong. His research interests include synthetic chemistry and catalytic chemistry, with emphasis on novel catalysts.

== Biography ==
Kwong earned his BSc from the Hong Kong Polytechnic University in 1996 and his PhD in Chemistry from the Chinese University of Hong Kong in 2000. From 2001 to 2003, he conducted postdoctoral research at the Massachusetts Institute of Technology (MIT) as a Croucher Foundation postdoctoral fellow supervised by Prof. Stephen L. Buchwald, an international expert in coupling reactions.

After returning to Hong Kong in 2003 during the SARS pandemic, Kwong faced difficulties finding employment. The following year, he joined the Department of Applied Biological and Chemical Sciences of the Hong Kong Polytechnic University in 2004 and was later promoted to professor in 2014.

In 2020, he was elected to the Hong Kong Young Academy of Sciences as one of the 27 members.

In 2023, he secured NSFC/RGC Joint Research Scheme funding for project 'The Development of Palladium Catalyst Systems for Catalytic Construction of Quaternary Carbon/Silicon-Stereogenic Centers'.

On 14 December 2024, Kwong was invited by RTHK to share his views on ‘Application Scenarios of Catalytic Chemistry’ in the programme ‘Future–Limitless’.

He is currently the chairman of the Department of Chemistry at the Chinese University of Hong Kong.

== Scientific achievements ==
Prof. Kwong specializes in developing catalysts for cross-coupling reactions involving organic synthesis. He has advanced methodologies for catalyst design and created a comprehensive library of catalysts, serving as a valuable resource for both academia and industry. Notably, his research on phosphine-based catalysts has demonstrated high catalytic efficiency. He also developed ligands for catalysis.

His research have explored new possibilities in organic synthesis, particularly involving C-H bonds. C-H bond offer an attractive alternative to traditional catalysts. His team uncovered an innovative approach to biaryl syntheses, utilizing DMEDA as a catalyst to facilitate direct C−H arylation of unactivated benzene.

== Awards ==
In March 2013, he was awarded Senior Research Fellowship by the Croucher Foundation. The award was precented by Mrs Carrie Lam Cheng Yuet-ngor.

== Patents ==
Kwong holds 2 US patents:

- Ligands for transition-metals and methods of use, 2008. US8212056B2
- Phosphines, synthesis thereof and their use in catalysis, 2014. US10093692B2
