= Kiangsu and Chekiang Primary School =

International school in Hong Kong

Coordinates: 22.28921°N 114.19854°E

Kiangsu and Chekiang Primary School Chinese: 蘇浙小學

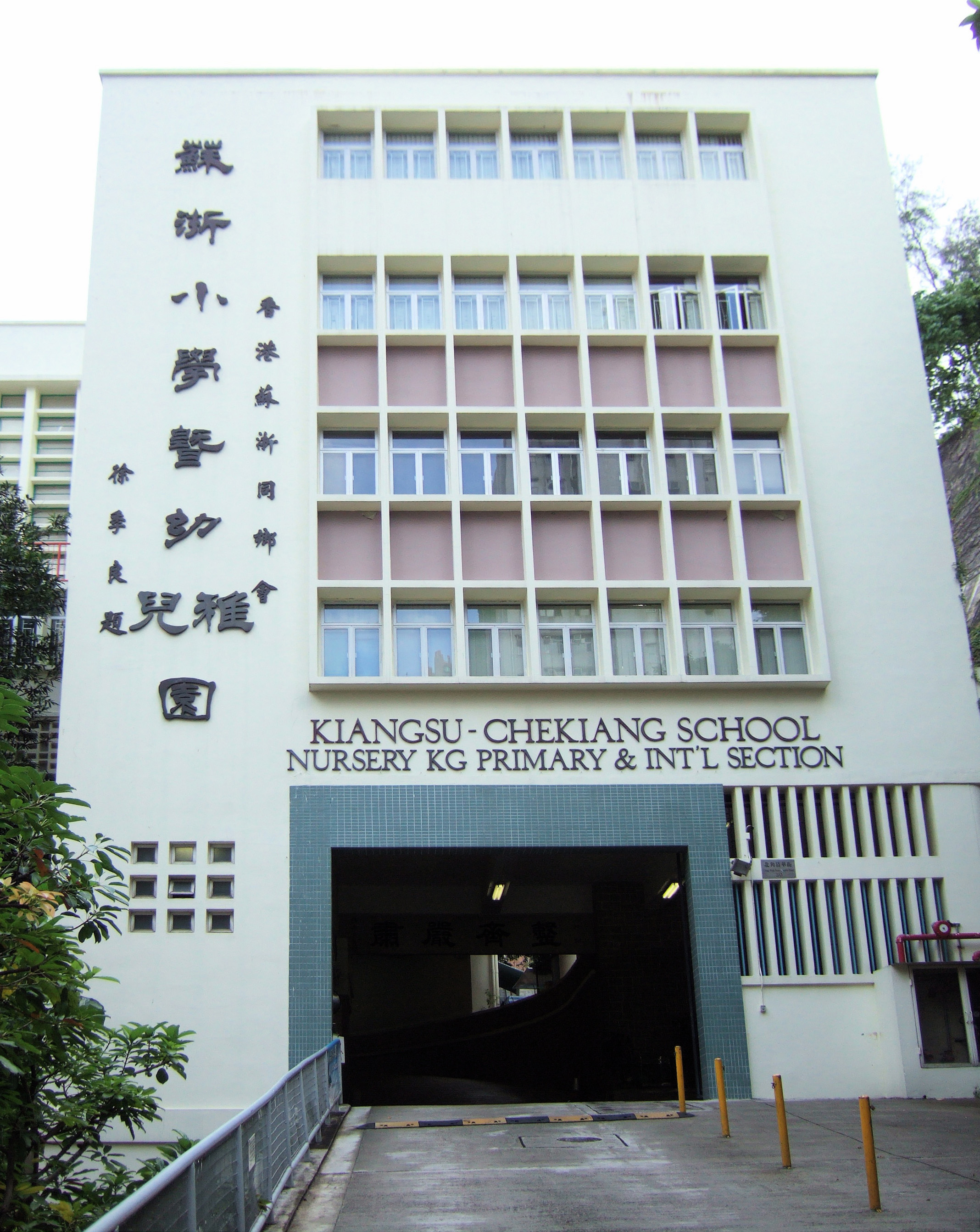
- 30, Ching Wah Street, North Point; Hong Kong

Information
- Type: nonprofit, kindergarten, primary, international
- Motto: 整齊嚴肅
- Established: 1953
- School district: North Point
- Principal: Wong Po-ming, JP
- Grades: N1 – Y13 (P2-Y13 in Kiangsu-Chekiang College)
- Affiliation: Kiangsu and Chekiang Residents' Association; Kiangsu–Chekiang College
- Website: http://www.kcs.edu.hk/

Kiangsu and Chekiang Primary School
- Traditional Chinese: 蘇浙小學
- Simplified Chinese: 苏浙小学
Transcriptions
Standard Mandarin
- Hanyu Pinyin: Sū Zhè Xiǎoxué
Yue: Cantonese
- Jyutping: sou1 zit3 siu2 hok6

Kiangsu and Chekiang Primary School (also called as KCPS) is a co-educational primary school in North Point, Hong Kong founded in 1953 by the Kiangsu and Chekiang Residents' Association of Hong Kong. It was the first school in Hong Kong to teach primarily in Mandarin Chinese, and for many years continued to be the only school to do so.

The school has a nursery and kindergarten section, and children are admitted from their second birthday into the nursery class.

== History ==
The school project was initiated by the Kiangsu and Chekiang Residents' Association of Hong Kong in 1949. Donations of HK$256,722 were raised to build a school on a 2,200-square-foot (200 m^{2}) plot of land on North Point Road donated by its vice-chairman. In 1953, Jeannie Sun Fong-chung (孫方中), then aged 25 and with no experience as an educator, was appointed as the founding principal of the school. She pioneered use of Mandarin as the medium of instruction, because she strongly believed it could cultivate a sense of belonging to China, but also improve students' Chinese language skills. Another revolutionary idea of hers at the time was to employ native English speakers to teach English. In the political environment prevailing at the time, the idea of teaching in Mandarin resulted in being branded "left-leaning". Sun served as the school's principal for 48 years.

Upon application from the school, the Hong Kong Government allocated a 91,000-square-foot (8,500 m^{2}) plot of land at 30 Ching Wah Street, the school's present location (then known as the "South campus") and construction began in January 1956. The school moved into its new premises in 1958. The foundation stone was laid by Hong Kong Governor Sir Robert Brown Black on 26 February 1958, and the school was ready for the new intake in August of the same year. The North Point Road site became known as the "North campus" thereafter.

The "international" section of the school opened in 1993 as the Kiangsu-Chekiang College, International Section.

== Curriculum ==
In 1994 the international division of school had Mandarin courses for all students from kindergarten to onward grades. The concept was that students in that division would gain an understanding of Mandarin. As of 1994, music and physical education courses were Mandarin medium for primary four and onwards even though other courses would remain English medium.

== Alumni ==
- Raymond Or
- Raymond Lam
- Liza Wang
- Simon Peh

== See also ==
- List of schools in Eastern District, Hong Kong
