= Hong Kong Post (newspaper) =

Japanese-language newspaper in Hong Kong

- Type: Daily newspaper
- Format: Print, online
- Owner: Hirose Trading HK Limited
- Founded: June 1987
- Language: Japanese
- Website: https://hkmn.jp/

Hong Kong Post (Japanese: 香港ポスト) is a Japanese-language weekly newspaper published in Hong Kong every Friday and owned by Mikuni Company. The newspaper first appeared in June 1987. It used to be sold in shops such as Citysuper, but is now free. It was formerly published by Pasona Press (HK) Co., Ltd.

Financial, economic, and political topics are stressed by this publication, and people working in business fields are the main clientele of the publication. Harumi Befu and Sylvie Guichard-Anguis, authors of Globalizing Japan: Ethnography of the Japanese presence in Asia, Europe, and America, described the paper as "a major source of information for Hong Kong's Japanese residents".

== History ==
The newspaper reported on anti-Japanese protests in 1996, including those targeting the Hong Kong Japanese School. Due to the protests being a reaction against past Japanese military actions, the newspaper's reporting lacked anger and shock towards the protests. Befu and Guichard-Anguis stated that the newspaper implied that "the past is irrelevant to the present" even though it never explicitly denied historical Japanese atrocities in Asia in any article.

Mikuni Company Limited (Note: Mikuni Company Limited: traditional Chinese: 三國有限公司; simplified Chinese: 三国有限公司; Jyutping: saam1 gwok3 jau5 haan6 gung1 si1; pinyin: Sānguó Yǒuxiàngōngsī) was the publisher. In November 2018 the publishing was suspended. In 2019 Hirose Trading HK Limited (Note: Hirose Trading HK Limited: 港通旭實業有限公司; 港通旭实业有限公司; gong2 tung1 juk1 sat6 jip6 jau5 haan6 gung1 si1; Gǎng Tōng Xù Shíyè Yǒuxiàngōngsī) became the publisher, and publication resumed.

== Composition ==
The initial page discusses the economy of politics of Hong Kong. The subsequent page discusses news in Hong Kong and the southern portions of China. Columns related to business in Hong Kong and the China region follow. The final pages have cultural and non-business topics.

== Corporate affairs ==
The head office of the publisher is in the Shui On Centre in Wan Chai.

The newspaper's head office was previously in the CCT Telecom Building (Note: CCT Telecom Building: 建電訊大廈; 建电讯大厦; gin3 din6 seon3 daai6 haa6; Jiàn Diànxùn Dàshà) in Fo Tan, Shatin. The newspaper's head office was previously in Leighton Centre (Note: Leighton Centre: 禮頓中心; 礼顿中心; lai5 deon6 zung1 sam1; Lǐ Dùn Zhōngxīn) in Causeway Bay.

== See also ==
- Japanese people in Hong Kong
- Hong Kong Japanese School
