= Choi Sai Woo Park =

Urban park in Hong Kong

Coordinates: 22.286734°N 114.201905°E

- Traditional Chinese: 賽西湖公園
- Simplified Chinese: 赛西湖公园
Transcriptions
Standard Mandarin
- Hanyu Pinyin: Sài Xīhú Gōngyuán
Yue: Cantonese
- Jyutping: coi3 sai1 wu4 gung1 jyun4*2

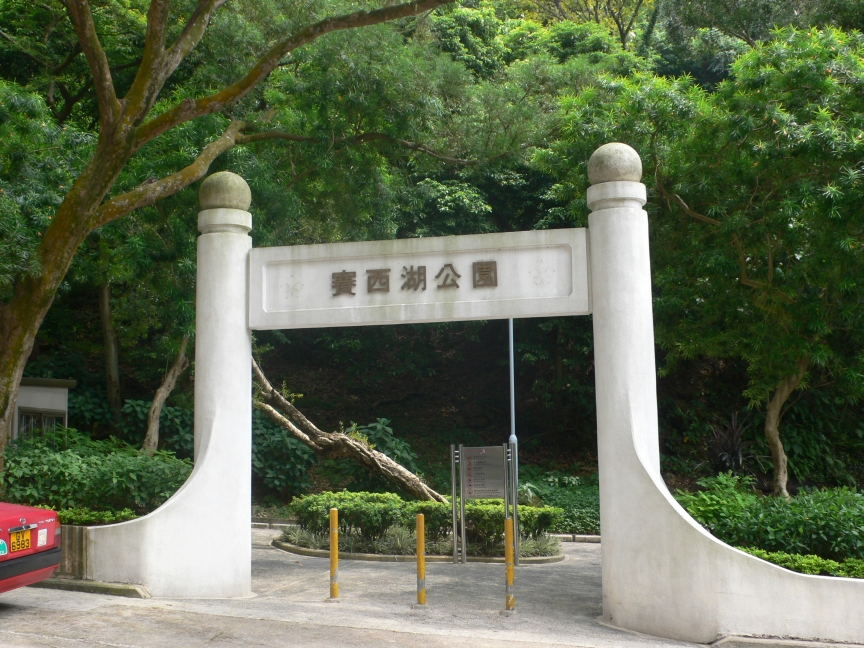
Main entrance of Choi Sai Woo Park

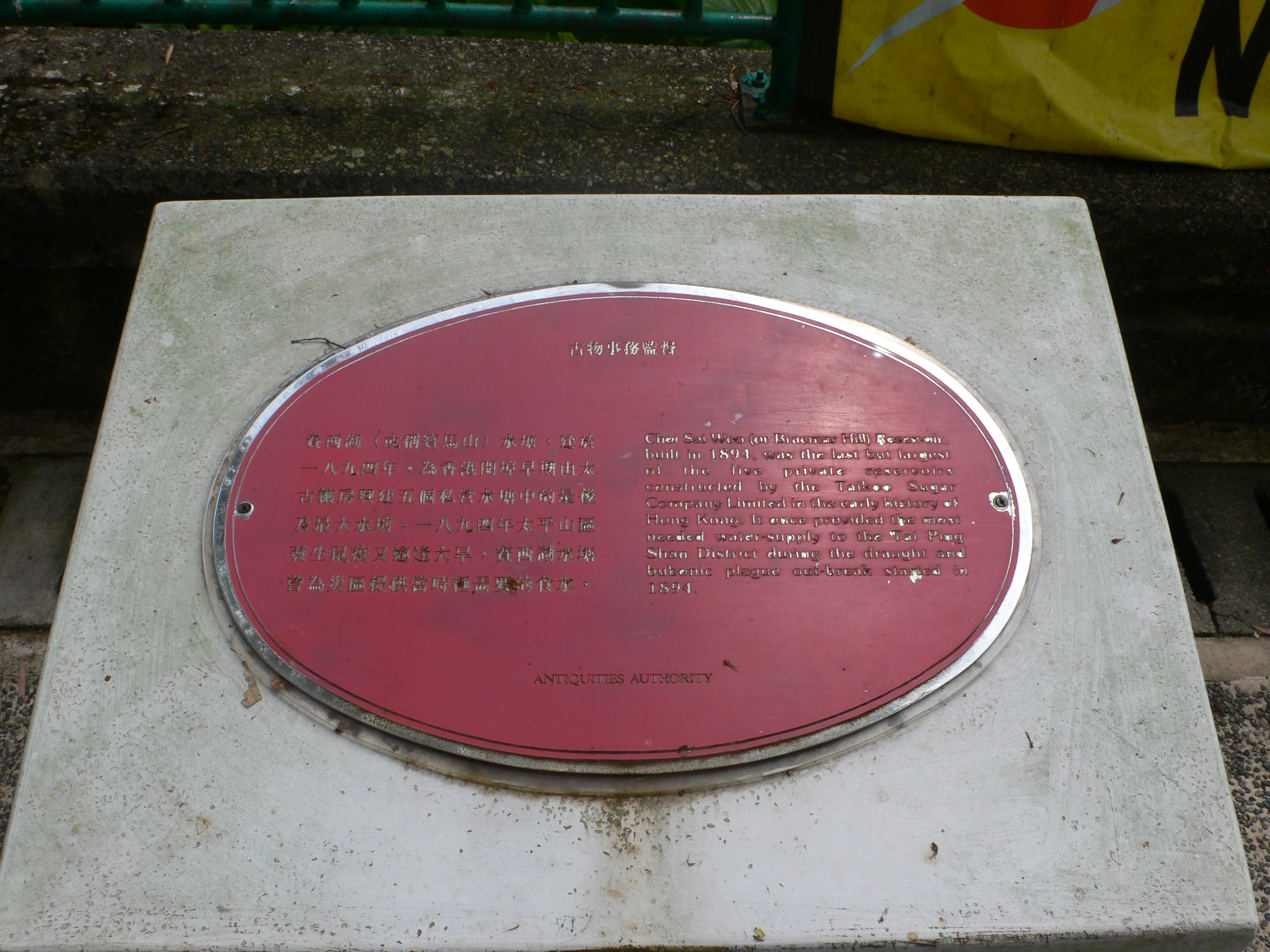
Commemorative plaque by the Antiquities Authority in Choi Sai Woo Park

Choi Sai Woo Park (Chinese: 賽西湖公園) is an urban park located near the top of Braemar Hill at Braemar Hill Road, Hong Kong. The park serves as a social hub for the neighbourhood.

== History ==
The park was named after the Choi Sai Woo Reservoir, which was formerly located in the park. According to the commemorative plaque in the park, the reservoir was built by Taikoo Sugar Company Limited in 1894; it was the largest and the last of the five private reservoirs built by the company. During the drought and bubonic plague outbreak that started in 1894, the reservoir once supplied water to Tai Ping Shan District. It was filled in by Li Ka-shing to create the current park site. In World War II it was the scene of bitter fighting as the Japanese advanced towards Wong Nai Chung Gap to split the defence of Hong Kong into two.

The park was built at a cost of $9.5 million and opened by the Urban Council in August 1986. It was designed to retain most of the existing mature trees and shrubs on site. An opening ceremony, officiated by Urban Councillor Kim Cham and the Director of Urban Services, was held on 16 January 1987.

== Facilities ==
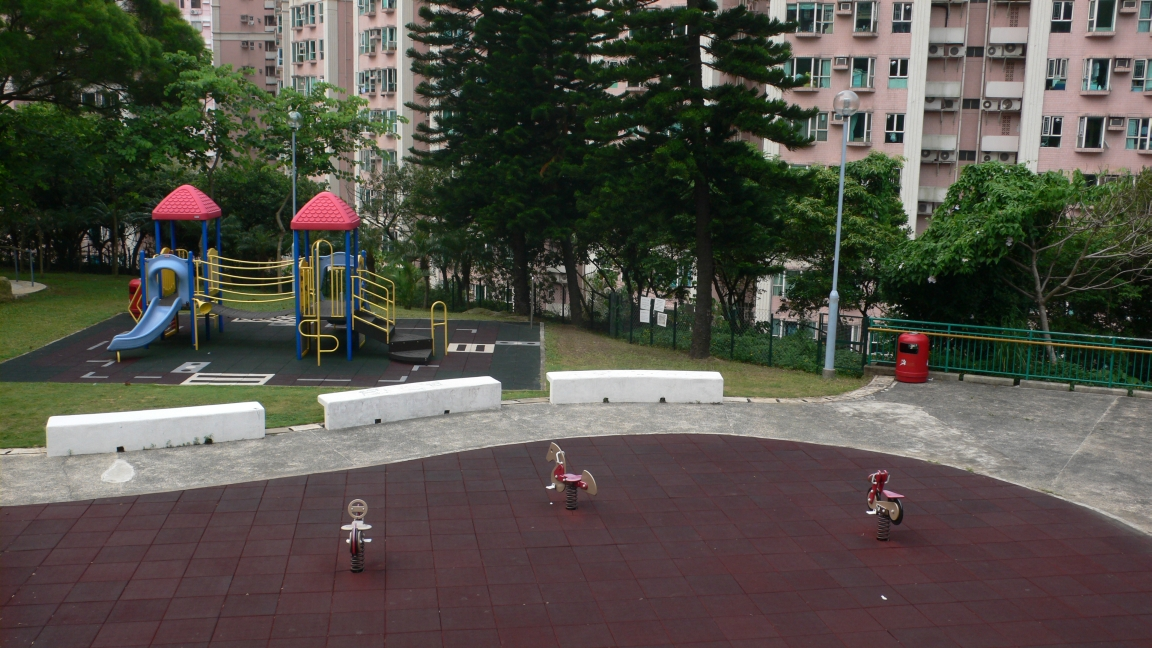
Children Playground

Choi Sai Woo Park is a landscaped garden with a total area of 2,400 m^{2} providing some country freshness among a number of housing estates and schools. Located next to prestigious new housing developments and with several schools in the area, it serves the community as a place of rest. There are two small basketball courts in the Park. The garden area is located at the very bottom level of Choi Sai Woo Park abutting the car parking lot of TutorTime. It is mainly planted with bamboo. There is a children's playground located at the top of the park. A pagoda adjoins the playground. There is also a swing and exercise equipment for the elderly. A number of amenities including restaurant or tea shop "cha chaan teng", Wan King, TutorTime and 7-Eleven outlets, can be found by walking up the hill.

== See also ==
- List of reservoirs of Hong Kong
- List of urban public parks and gardens in Hong Kong
- Braemar Hill Mansions, an adjacent housing estate
