= Japanese people in Hong Kong =

- (Japan) (Hong Kong)
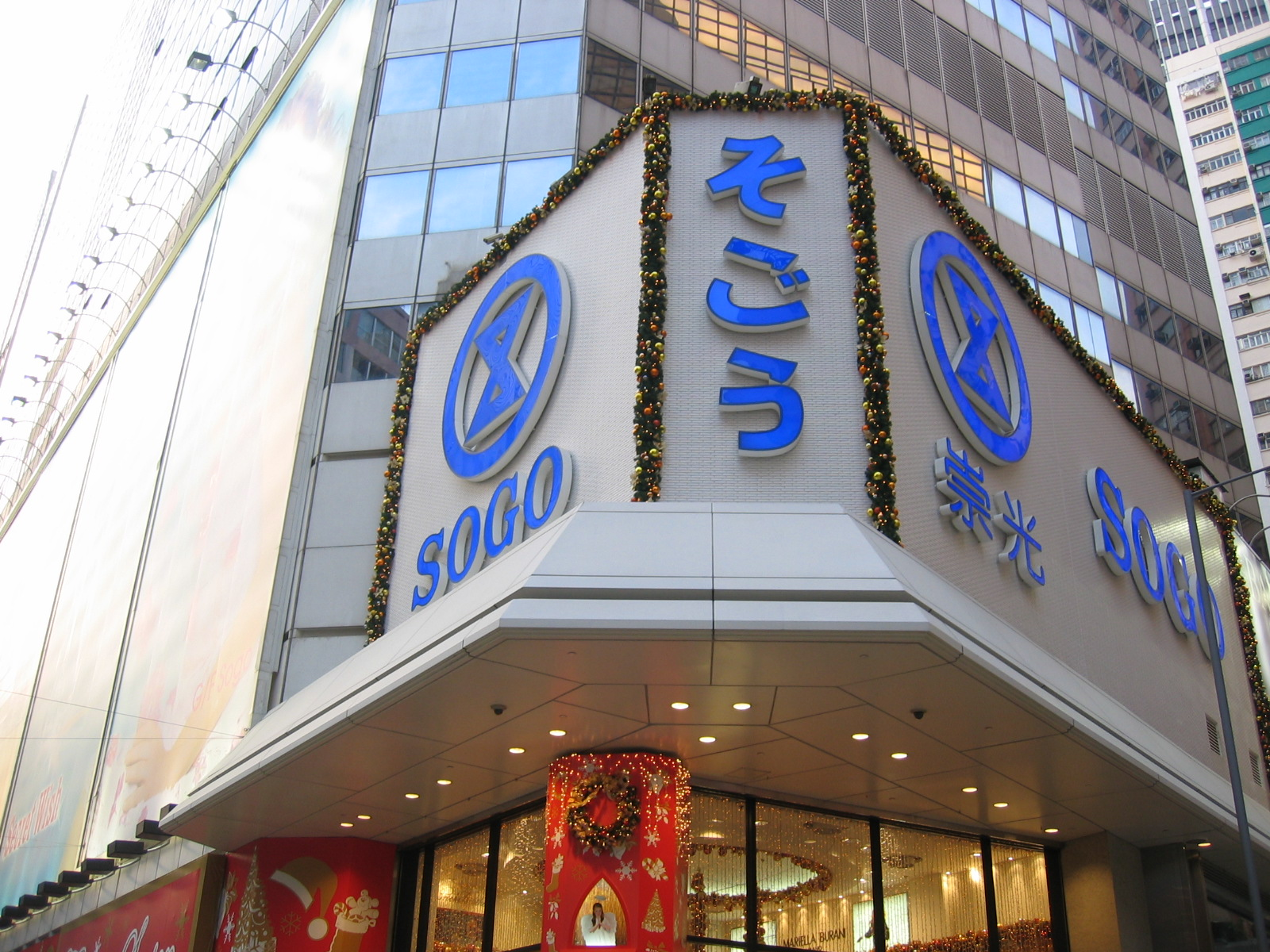
- Sogo is one of the many Japanese-managed companies in Hong Kong

Total population
- 21,518 (2021)

Regions with significant populations
- Taikoo Shing, Hung Hom, Tai Po

Languages
- Japanese (77.4%), English (17.2%), Cantonese (3.9%), Mandarin (1.0%) (Respondents to 2011 Census who identified as Japanese and stated that the given language was their usual language)

Religion
- Christianity • Buddhism • Japanese Tenrikyo • Shinto • Irreligion

Related ethnic groups
- Japanese people in China

Japanese people in Hong Kong consist primarily of expatriate business people and their families, along with a smaller number of single women. Their numbers are smaller when compared to the sizeable presence of American, British, and Canadian expatriates. As of 2010, 21,518 Japanese people had registered as residents of Hong Kong with the Japanese consulate there. Hong Kong also remains a popular destination for Japanese tourists on their way to Mainland China; in 2004, the Japanese consulate reported the arrival of more than one million Japanese tourists.

According to the 2021 population census in Hong Kong, there are 21,518 Japanese people living in Hong Kong, most of which lived in the Eastern District and Kowloon City District, such as Taikoo Shing and Hung Hom.

== History ==
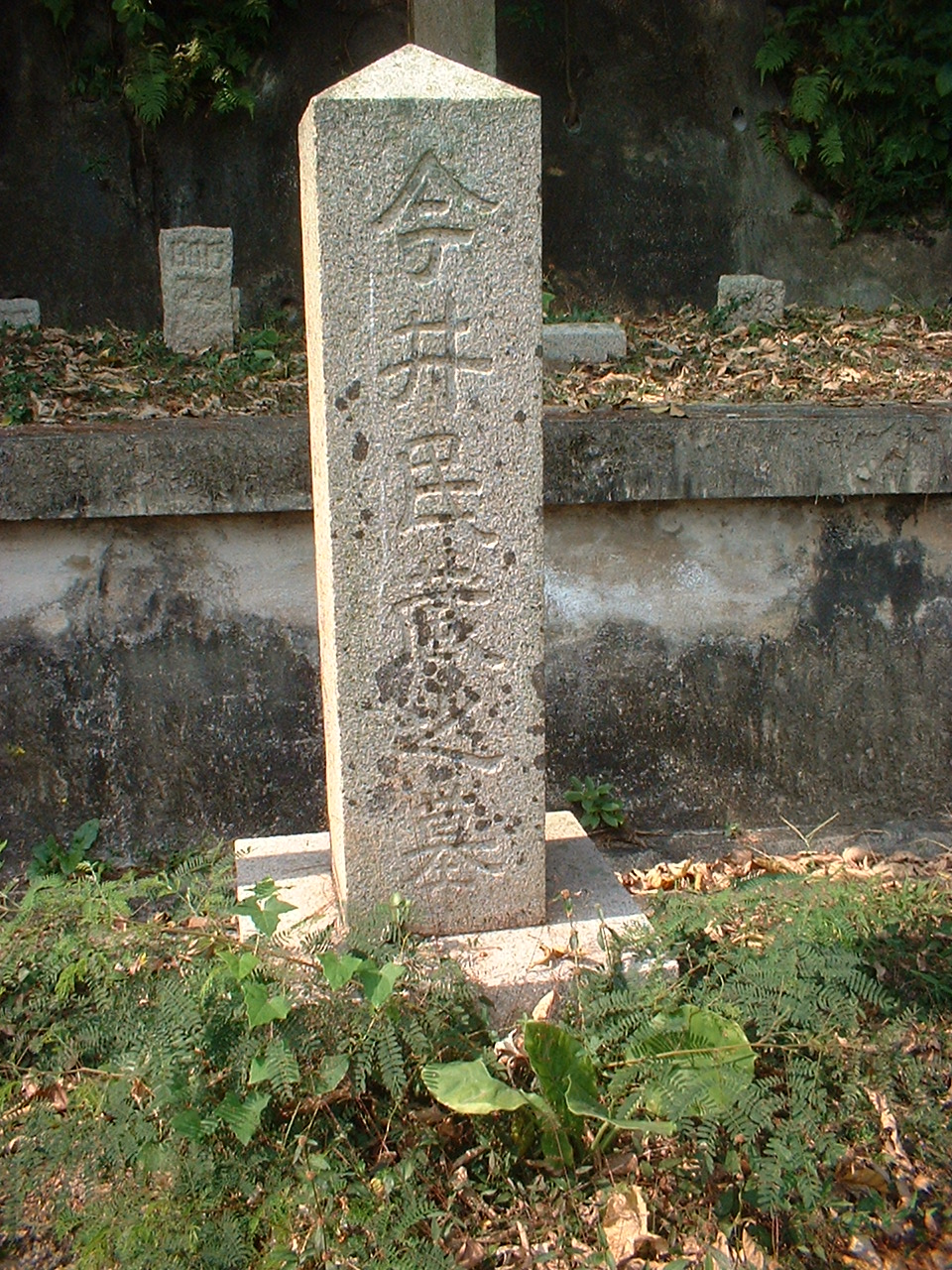
A traditional Japanese grave marker in Hong Kong Cemetery, Happy Valley

=== Origins ===
Japanese migration to Hong Kong began in the late Tokugawa shogunate, coinciding with the end of Japan’s isolationist policies. With the forced end of the sakoku policy, which prohibited Japanese people from leaving Japan, regular ship services began between Japan, Hong Kong and Shanghai; Japanese merchants and karayuki slowly began to settle overseas. By 1880, 26 men and 60 women of Japanese nationality were recorded as living in Hong Kong; the total population would reach 200 by the end of the Meiji era in 1912. To the displeasure of the Japanese government, which was concerned with protecting its image overseas, many of these early migrants were prostitutes called Karayuki-san. The early ones were often stowaways on coal ships from Nagasaki.

By 1885, Japanese consul Minami Sadatsuke, had obtained some level of informal co-operation from the British colonial authorities in suppressing Japanese participation in prostitution: the number of Japanese women granted prostitution licences would be limited to fifty-two, and others who applied for licences would be referred to his office, whereupon he would arrange for their repatriation to Japan or have them confined to the lock hospital in Wan Chai. Later, their geographical origins seemed to have shifted; a 1902 report by Japanese consul Noma Seiichi identified Moji in Kyushu as the most common port of origin for these young women; recruiters often targeted young women coming out of the Mojikō Station near the docks. However, the Japanese consulate had little co-operation from the local Japanese community in their efforts to suppress prostitution; Japanese businesspeople in the hospitality industry depended on custom from prostitutes and their johns for its profits.

=== Early 20th century and anti-Japanese sentiment ===
Following the Japanese invasion of Manchuria, tensions between Japanese and ethnic Chinese residents in Hong Kong began to grow. The first report of the invasion in the Hong Kong Chinese-language press appeared in the Kung Sheung Evening News on 20 September 1931, condemning it in harsh terms and calling on Chinese people to "stand up and take action". The Kuomintang government in Nanking declared 23 September 1931 as a day of mourning for the Mukden Incident; that evening, a disturbance arose on Johnston Road in Wan Chai, where many Japanese lived, when some Chinese youths began throwing stones at a Japanese-owned pub, ironically patronised mostly by American and British sailors at the time. The next day, a Japanese flag flying in a Japanese school in Kennedy Town was burned; attacks on individual Japanese continued on the 25th.

One of the most violent incidents of the unrest was the murder of a Japanese family. On 26 September, the date of the Mid-Autumn Festival, five members of the Yamashita family were attacked near Kowloon City in front of more than one thousand Chinese demonstrators by a Chinese man; the parents died on the scene due to knife wounds, while the grandmother and two of three sons later died in hospital. As a result of the murders, the colonial government called out the military that evening, and proclaimed a state of emergency the next day. Tokyo would later cite these riots, and specifically the murders of the Yamashita family, as one casus belli when they initiated the Shanghai War of 1932 (a.k.a. 28 January Incident).

=== Japanese occupation and Japanese civilians ===
The Japanese population did not grow much in the following decade; though Japanese schools continued to operate in Wan Chai and Kennedy Town, by the time of the Japanese declaration of war against the British Empire and the start of the Battle of Hong Kong, the Japanese population of Hong Kong had dropped to 80. Japanese settlers often followed the Imperial Japanese Army, as in the case of Manchukuo in the aftermath of the Mukden Incident; however the 1941–1945 Japanese occupation of Hong Kong was not accompanied by an influx of Japanese civilians, with the exception of a few bureaucrats and administrators.

The existing institutions of the Japanese civilian population in Hong Kong were co-opted by the military for their own purposes; for example, the Hong Kong News, a Japanese language newspaper, ceased publication in Japanese, but continued operations in Chinese and English versions, printing officially-approved news of the occupation government. However, the Japanese civilians who remained in Hong Kong were not entirely unsympathetic to the plight of their Chinese neighbours; Patrick Yu, a trial lawyer, recalled in his memoirs the assistance his family received from the headmaster of the Japanese school in escaping from Hong Kong to Free China by way of Macau and Guangzhouwan (then Portuguese and French colonies, respectively, and untouched by the Japanese military).

=== Post-World War II ===
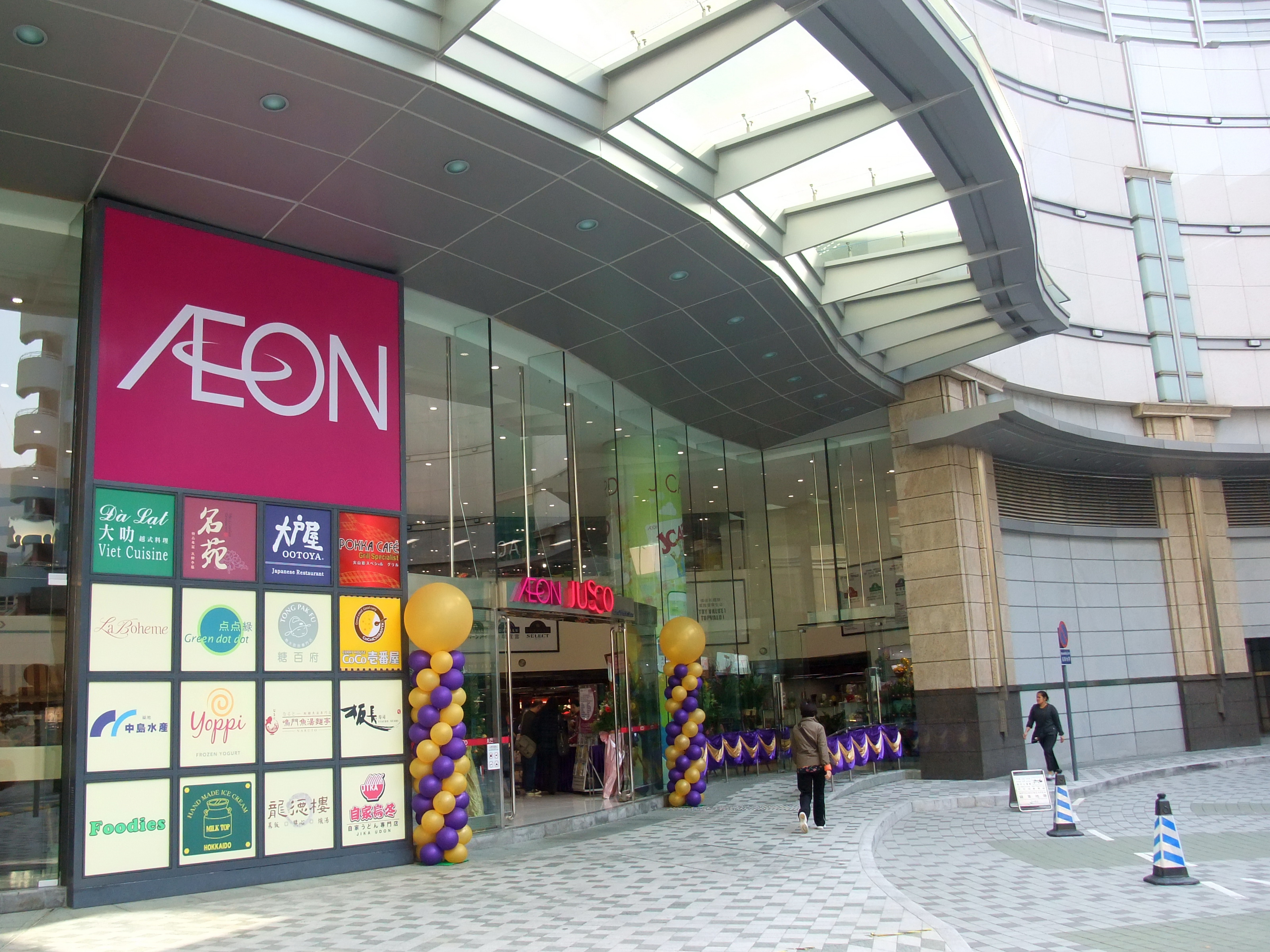
AEON (formerly JUSCO) is one of the largest Japanese retail stores operated in Hong Kong

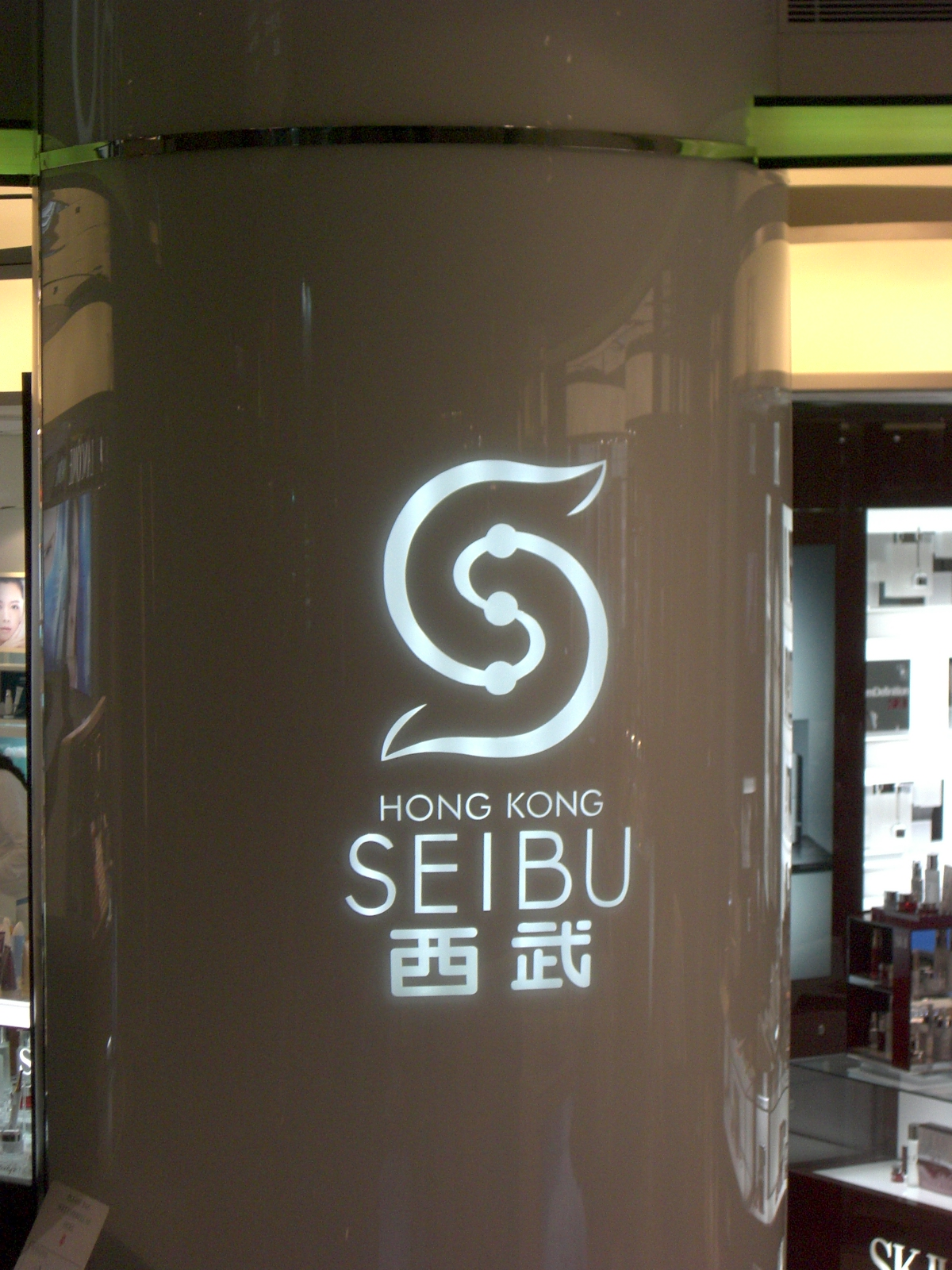
Seibu Department Stores in Langham Place, Hong Kong

As the Japanese economy recovered from the effects of World War II and began its boom, Japanese investment overseas grew, resulting in an increase in the Japanese population living in Hong Kong. The Hong Kong Japanese School, an international school aimed at Japanese students, was established in the 1960s; there is also a weekly print newspaper, the Hong Kong Post, which began publication in June 1987. Between 1981 and 1999, the population of Japanese in Hong Kong nearly tripled from 7,802 to 23,480, making the Japanese community similar in size to those in cities such as London and New York; in line with this increase, the number of Japanese companies also grew rapidly, almost doubling from 1,088 to 2,197 from 1988 to 1994.

The reform and opening up of China and the return of Hong Kong to Chinese sovereignty in 1997 spurred increasing economic integration with the mainland, and, following this trend, many Japanese-managed companies moved their operations across the border into Shenzhen and Guangzhou; as a result, the Japanese population of Hong Kong declined from its 1999 peak; the Hong Kong Census and Statistics Department recorded only 14,100 Japanese people in 2001, a 33% decrease. However, the population would soon bounce back; in 2004, the Japanese Consulate General estimated 25,600 Japanese living in Hong Kong.

The number of Japanese nationals living in Hong Kong. View source data.

The Eastern District has the highest concentration of Japanese residents of any district in Hong Kong, with 0.64% of its residents being of Japanese descent (2,878 people).

== Attitude towards integration ==
Japanese retailers, such as AEON and Sogo, remain key players in Hong Kong’s consumer market. Japanese financial institutions also play a role in Hong Kong’s banking sector, further strengthening economic ties between the two regions. Additionally, Japanese multinational corporations contribute to Hong Kong's business landscape through investments in technology, retail, and logistics. communities abroad have been described as "Japanese villages abroad ... whose residents make maintenance of cultural, economic, and political ties with Tokyo their foremost concern"; however, Wong's 2001 study of Yaohan employees refuted this notion in the case of businesswomen working in Hong Kong. Though the majority of Japanese coming to Hong Kong continued to be businessmen and their families, during the 1990s, there was a "boom" of single Japanese women emigrating toseeking greater career opportunities compared to traditional Japanese corporate structures; unlike previous migration, which had often been targeted towards Anglophone countries, many of these women went to Hong Kong and other Asian cities in an effort to further their careers. Notably, in one survey, a third of the single or divorced women coming to Hong Kong during this period reported previous study abroad experience. Not only were single women more willing to emigrate, but Japanese companies in Hong Kong proved more willing to hire and promote women than those in Japan, partially due to the costs of employing male staff, which typically included allowances for children's education and other such expatriate benefits.

Within Japanese-managed companies, local Chinese employees sensed a definite power differential between Japanese managers and local managers of the same rank. Though many Japanese women came to Hong Kong intending to learn to speak Chinese (either Cantonese or Mandarin), upon arrival they found that communicating in English was not only sufficient for everyday life, but placed them in a privileged position vis-a-vis the local population. Among respondents to the 2011 Census who self-identified as Japanese, 77.4% stated that they spoke Japanese as their usual language, 17.2% English, 3.9% Cantonese, and 1.0% Mandarin. With regards to additional spoken languages other than their usual language, 64.3% stated that they spoke English, 18.7% Cantonese, 18.7% Mandarin, and 19.5% Japanese. (Multiple responses were permitted to the latter question, hence the responses are non-exclusive and the sum is greater than 100%.) 4.1% did not speak Japanese as either their usual language nor an additional language, while the respective figures for English, Cantonese, and Mandarin were 18.4%, 77.4%, and 81.3%.

== Education ==
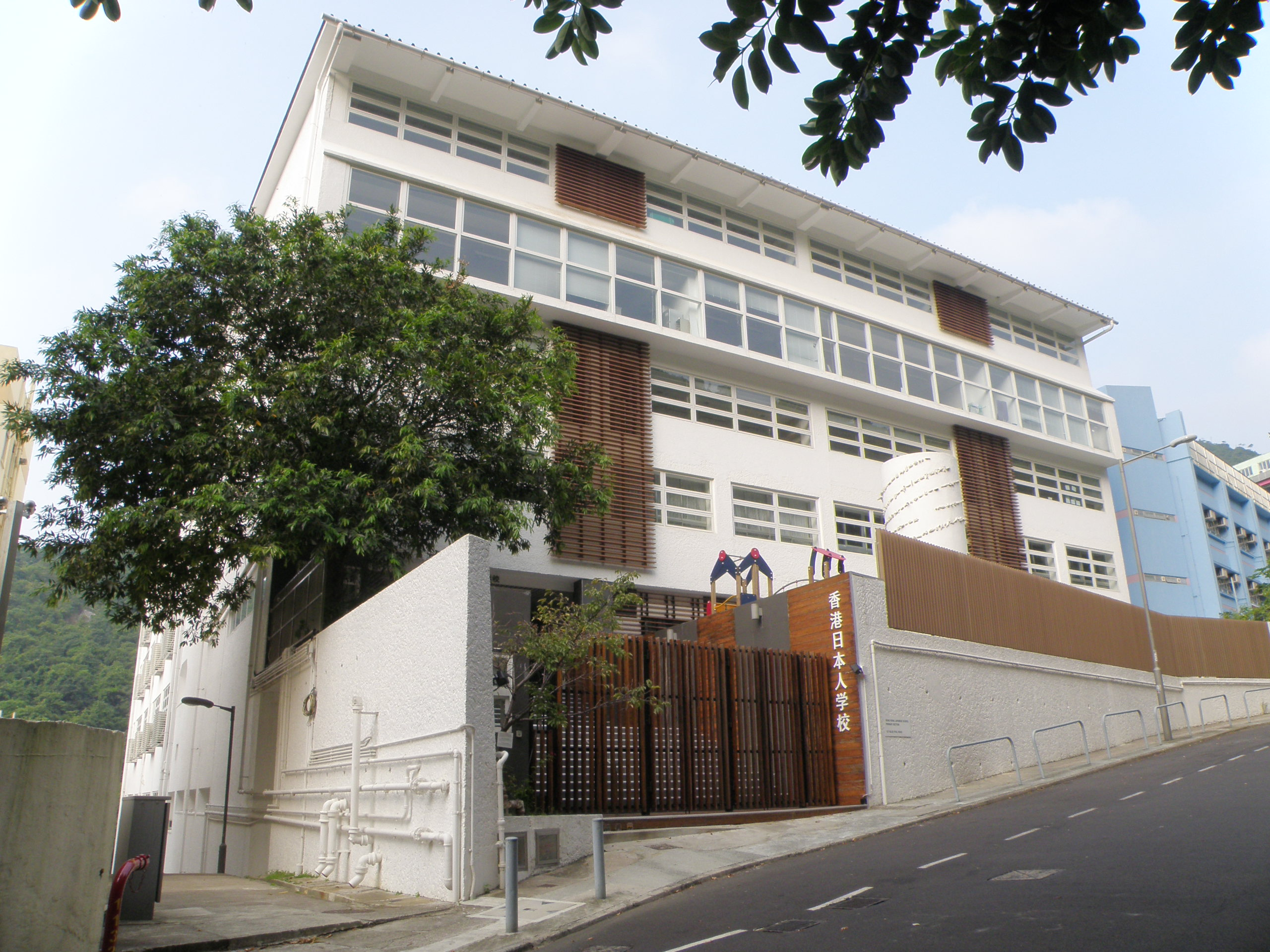
Hong Kong Japanese School Happy Valley Campus

The Hong Kong Japanese School, an international Japanese school, serves the city's Japanese population.The Hong Kong Japanese School and the Japanese Supplementary School continue to serve the community, reflecting long-term settlement trends. Additionally, Japanese language courses and cultural programs are increasingly popular among Hong Kong residents, with universities and private institutions offering language immersion experiences.

The Hong Kong Japanese Supplementary School (香港日本人補習授業校, Honkon Nihonjin Hoshū Jugyō Kō; HKJSS) is a supplementary programme for Japanese children in Hong Kong.

The first Japanese primary school, operated by the Japanese Club, opened in a campus on Kennedy Road in 1911. At the time most Japanese expatriates did not bring their families and there were fewer than 100 Japanese children at any one time, so the school had a relatively low enrollment.

== Media ==
The Hong Kong Post is the Japanese-language newspaper of Hong Kong.

== Recreation ==
There is a social club for Japanese people in Hong Kong, The Hongkong Japanese Club (Chinese and Japanese: 香港日本人倶楽部), which has its building in Causeway Bay. The club, previously in the Hennessy Centre (興利中心), initially catered only to Japanese people and a hand-picked group of non-Japanese, numbering around 200. In 1996 there were 4,228 Japanese members. It increased the number of non-Japanese members to 276 by 2002; as of that year within the membership the Japanese numbered 2,715. The number of non-Japanese members declined as the Japanese community was less wealthy than before, and because more and more Japanese involved in business in Guangdong Province lived in Shenzhen instead of Hong Kong. As of 2002 the membership flat fee for Japanese was HK$200–400, and the deposit was $1,000, while the fee for non-Japanese was $9,500. The monthly rates for membership were $150–280 for Japanese and $340 for non-Japanese.

A group of Japanese business executives established the Japanese Club in 1905, and its clubhouse in Central opened in 1906. It became the centre of Hong Kong's Japanese community since the Japanese consulate lacked proper funds and staff to take that role. It became known as the Japanese Association in 1921.

== Technology and innovation ==
Japanese technology firms have expanded their influence in Hong Kong’s innovation sector, particularly in robotics and AI applications within business and education. Collaborations between Japanese and Hong Kong-based startups in fintech and smart city initiatives are fostering technological advancements in both regions.

== Notable individuals ==
- Scott MacKenzie, darts player, born in Brazil to mixed Japanese and Scottish parentage. Moved to the UK aged 6, then to Hong Kong in 1996, which he represents at a professional international level.
- Shinichi Chan, born in Tokyo to mixed Japanese and Hongkonger parentage, member of Hong Kong National Football Team
- Shigeru Koyama, a business executive instrumental in strengthening economic ties between Japan and Hong Kong, particularly in the finance and retail sectors.
- Yuki Matsumoto, a chef and restaurateur known for introducing contemporary Japanese cuisine to Hong Kong, significantly influencing the city's fine dining scene.
