= Kiangsu-Chekiang College, International Section =

Private school in Hong Kong

- 蘇浙公學國際部
- Braemar Hill; Hong Kong

Information
- Type: Private, international, secondary
- Principal: Fung Chung Lun
- Years offered: 7–13
- Gender: Co-educational
- Enrollment: Approx. 500
- Colors: Blue and White
- Mascot: Spotted Cat
- Website: kcis.edu.hk

Kiangsu-Chekiang College, International Section
- Traditional Chinese: 蘇浙公學國際部
- Simplified Chinese: 苏浙公学国际部
Transcriptions
Standard Mandarin
- Hanyu Pinyin: Sū Zhè Gōngxué Guójì Bù
Yue: Cantonese
- Jyutping: sou1 zit3 gung1 hok6 gwok3 zai3 bou6

Kiangsu-Chekiang College, International Section, or KCCIS (Chinese: 蘇浙公學國際部) is a private bilingual school in Hong Kong that teaches in both English and Mandarin. Students complete their education through the IGCSE syllabus in Years 10–11 and the IB Diploma Programme in Years 12–13. Students come from diverse backgrounds, representing over 40 different nationalities.

== History ==
Kiangsu & Chekiang Primary School was founded in 1953 by Kiangsu and Chekiang Residents (HK) Association. Proposed by P.Y. Chow, the Supervisor, its International Section (KCIS) first opened in September 1993. The school was one of the first in Hong Kong to offer an English-medium curriculum coupled with a daily lesson in Mandarin for all students aged 3 to 11. This allowed the school to serve more students in the Hong Kong area. Due to the high demand for schools, a new extension in Braemar Hill, North Point was established in September 2002.

This extension, branching from Kiangsu and Chekiang Primary School, was known as the Upper School Campus. It used part of the Kiangsu-Chekiang College campus on Braemar Hill for the upper Primary classes and International Secondary section.

The number of students in the school can range from 300 to 400, depending on the number of classes in each grade from year 7 to 13. From years 7 to 9, students take the Key Stage 3 program; from years 10 to 11, they take the IGCSE program; and in years 12 to 13, they take the IB Diploma/IB Certificate.

== Curriculum ==
Kiangsu-Chekiang College uses the British Curriculum. Starting from Year 2, students continue learning Chinese as their second language, whereas English is the medium for all other subjects; English and Mathematics are treated as discrete subjects, with the only specialty classes being Music and Physical Education. After Grade 6, students start their secondary education, which lasts from years 7 to 13.
