= Hong Kong Japanese School =

International school

Hong Kong Japanese School and Japanese International School
- 香港日本人学校 香港日本人學校

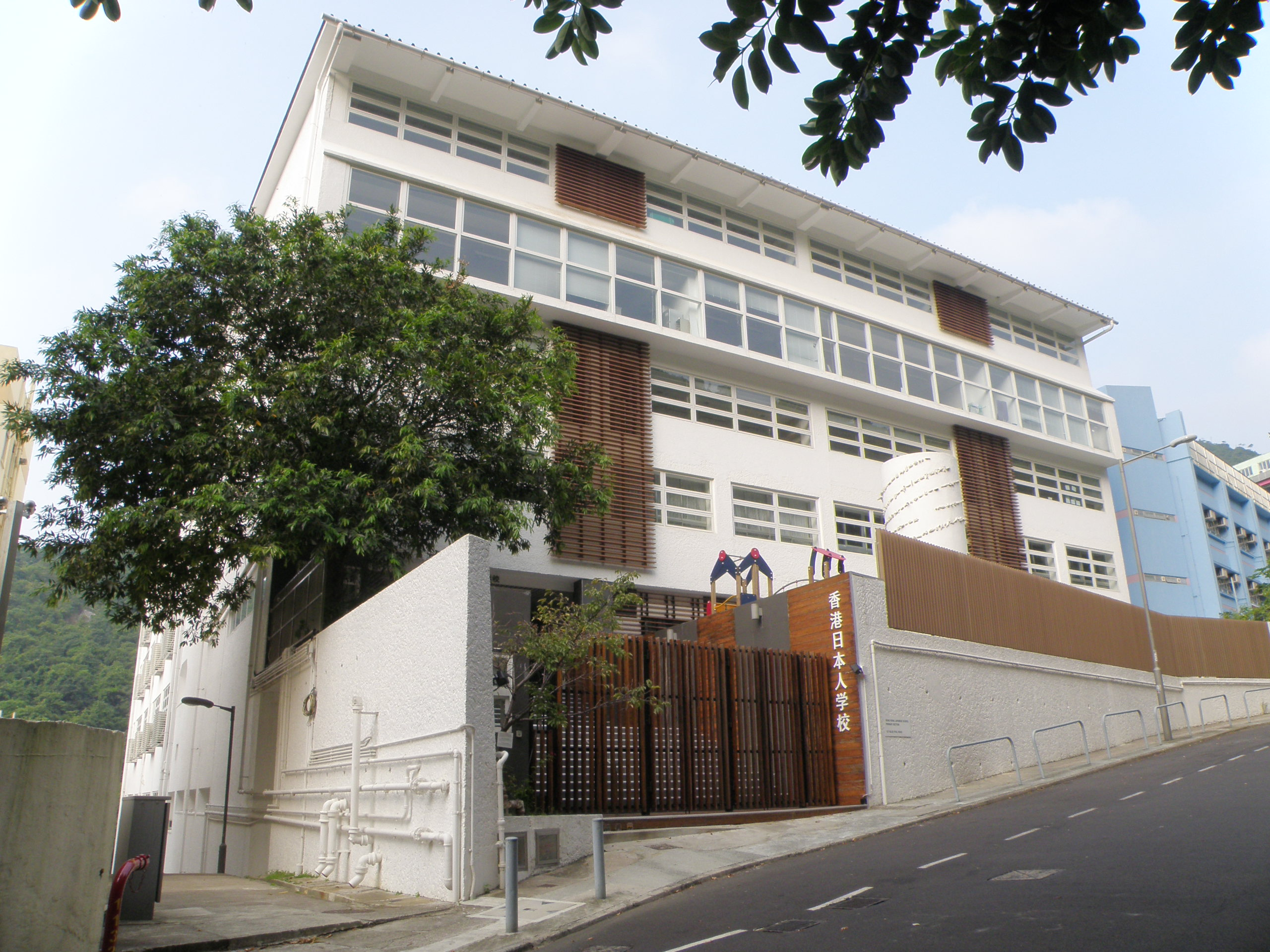
- Primary and junior high campus in Happy Valley, Wan Chai District

Location
- Primary & Secondary: No. 157 Blue Pool Road; International: No. 4663 Tai Po Road, Tai Po, NT; Hong Kong

Information
- Type: Elementary and junior high school
- Grades: 1–9
- Website: www.hkjs.edu.hk

Hong Kong Japanese School and Japanese International School

Chinese name
- Traditional Chinese: 香港日本人學校
- Simplified Chinese: 香港日本人学校
Transcriptions
Standard Mandarin
- Hanyu Pinyin: Xiānggǎng Rìběnrén Xuéxiào
Yue: Cantonese
- Jyutping: hoeng1 gong2 jat6 bun2 jan4 hok6 haau6

Japanese name
- Kanji: 香港日本人学校
Transcriptions
- Romanization: Honkon Nihonjin Gakkō

The Hong Kong Japanese School and Japanese International School (HKJS&JIS) is a Japanese international school in Hong Kong. It consists of a Japanese section and international section. The Hong Kong Japanese School Limited operates the school system.

The Japanese primary and secondary school sections are in a campus located along Blue Pool Road, in Happy Valley. The international school is in Tai Po. The Tai Po campus opened in 1997. The Japanese secondary school was previously located in Braemar Hill, North Point.

As of 2020 the principal of the secondary section is Osamu Kobayashi (小林 修, Kobayashi Osamu), the principal of the Hong Kong Island Japanese elementary school is Yoshitaka Yamazaki (山崎秀哲, Yamazaki Yoshitaka), the principal of the Tai Po Japanese elementary school is Misato Kitanaka (北中 美郷, Kitanaka Misato), and the principal of the international section is Joshua Blue, replacing Simon Walton, who retired in 2022.

== History ==
A school for Japanese children opened in 1946, with eight people employed to teach. South China Morning Post stated the initial enrollment was 70.

According to the HKJS website, it was established in May 1966 (Showa 41), and opened on 10 May of that year. According to Vivienne Poy, her father, Richard Charles Lee, helped facilitate the establishment of the school. It opened because the government of Japan dedicated a subsidiary budget for it. The initial enrollment was 70, and the initial principal was Ichiro Fujita (藤田 一郎, Fujita Ichirō).

The initial location was floors two and three of Tower Court (崇明大廈). Its official opening ceremony was on 15 October. At the time it covered only primary grades, and its enrollment was 84. Additional space in the Ling Ying Building (嶺英商場) was used, beginning in April 1971, for kindergarten and primary school classes. The current Japanese section elementary campus opened on 24 January 1976. On 23 October 1982 the Japanese section junior high campus opened.

Beginning circa 1994 the school engaged in exchange programmes with Hong Kong schools for children from Hong Kong and with other international schools in Hong Kong and Macau.

In 1996 protesters against Japanese claims on the Senkaku Islands/Diaoyu Islands did activities outside of the Happy Valley school, as part of the Senkaku Islands dispute. Principal Akihiro Kaku argued that the consulate general would have been a more appropriate protest area, not the school. The Hong Kong Post characterized the incident as an attack against the school.

In 1994 the school system asked the Hong Kong government for permission to build a new school for an international section. The international school in Tai Po opened in 1997. The funds used to build the campus came from a grant issued by the Hong Kong government.

In April 2018 the junior high school moved to the Happy Valley campus.

== Divisions ==
The Japanese division uses the Japanese school calendar and curriculum while the English-medium international division uses Hong Kong's school calendar. The international division has students who will reside in Hong Kong and/or otherwise reside outside of Japan in the long run.

== Gallery ==
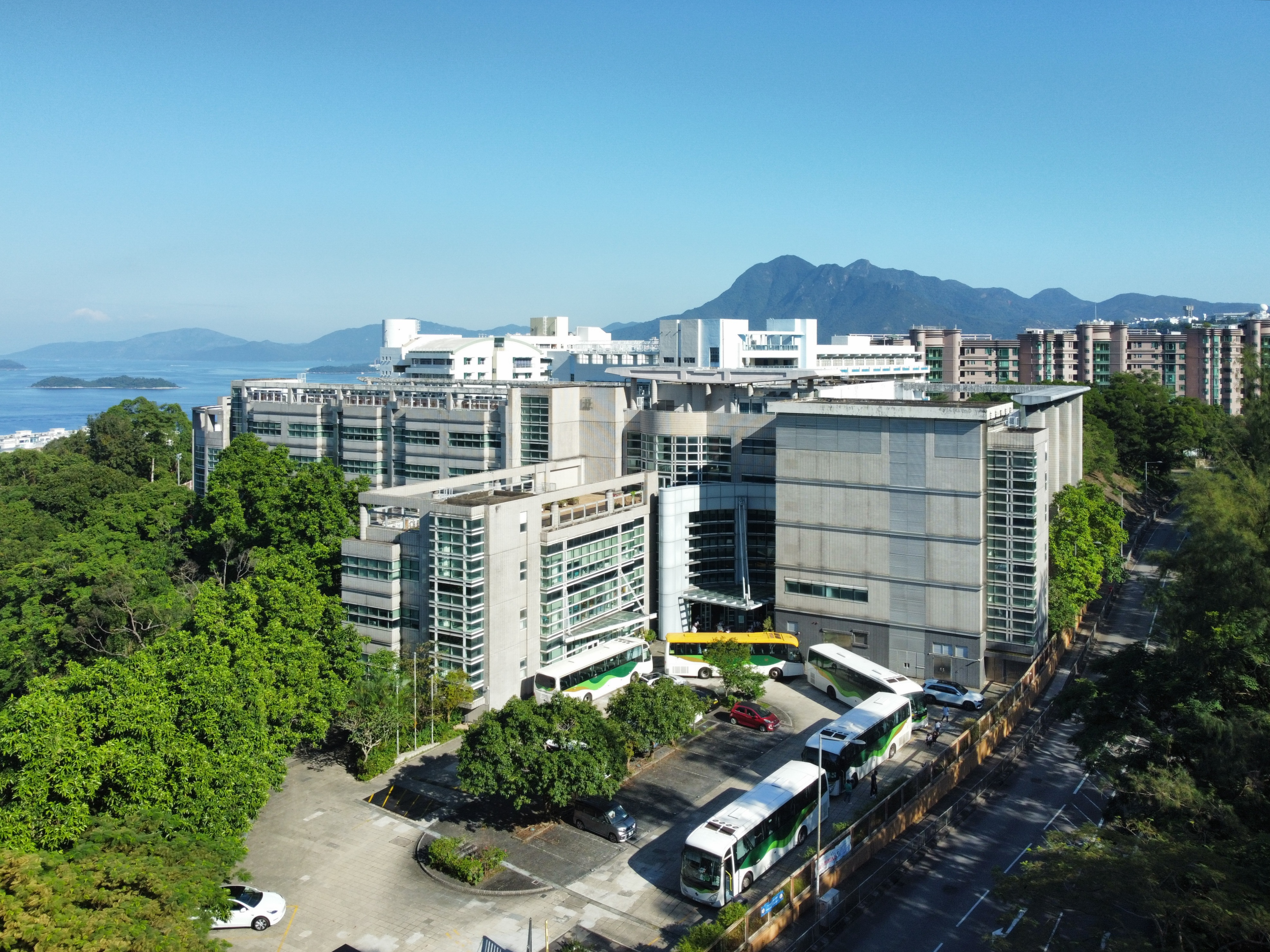
Tai Po (International) Campus

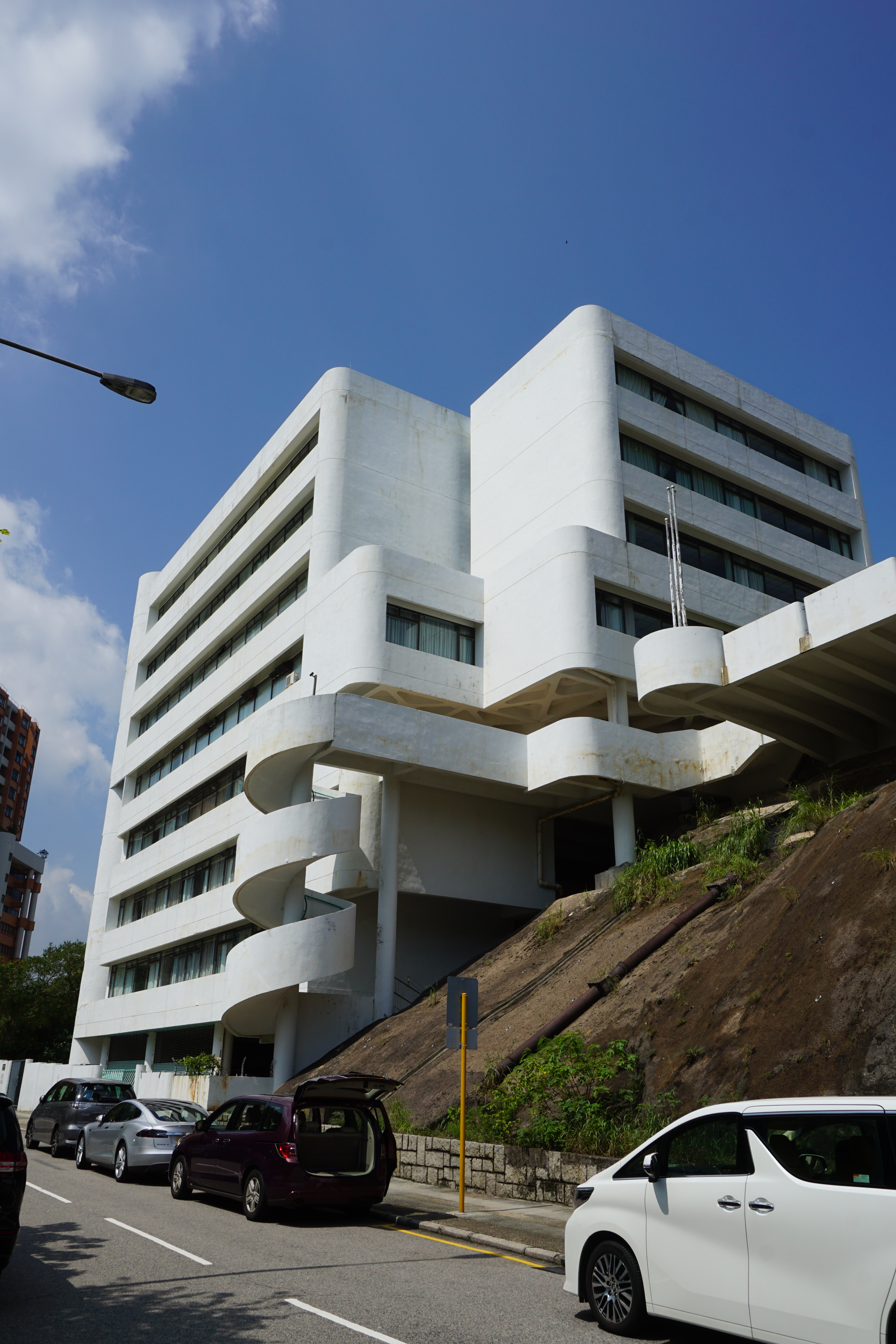
Former Hong Kong Japanese School Secondary Campus in Braemar Hill, North Point (the junior high moved from here in April 2018)

== Maps ==
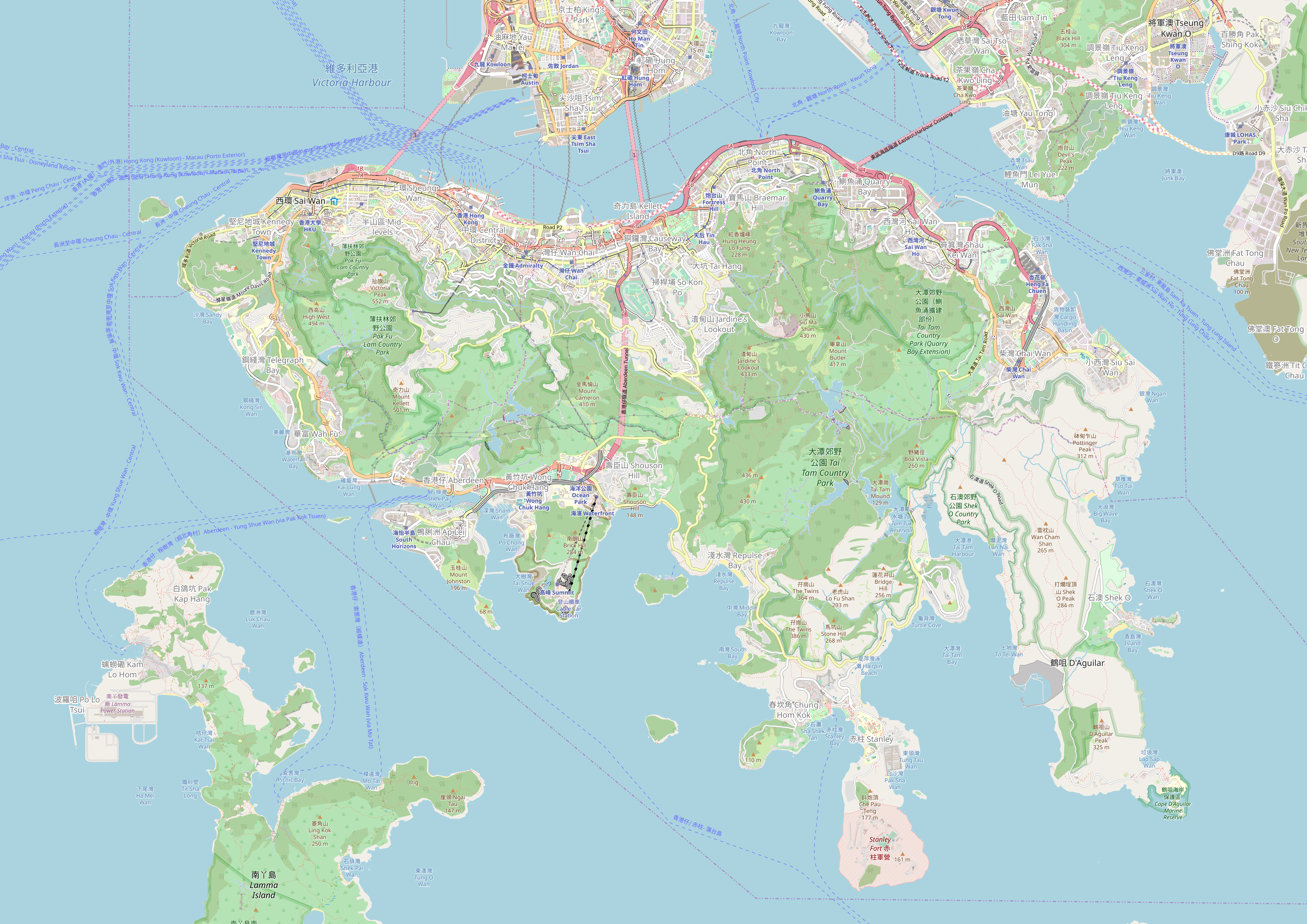
Campuses on Hong Kong Island
Campuses in Hong Kong

== See also ==
- Japanese people in Hong Kong
- Hong Kong Post
