= Braemar Hill =

Hill on Hong Kong Island, Hong Kong

- 寶馬山
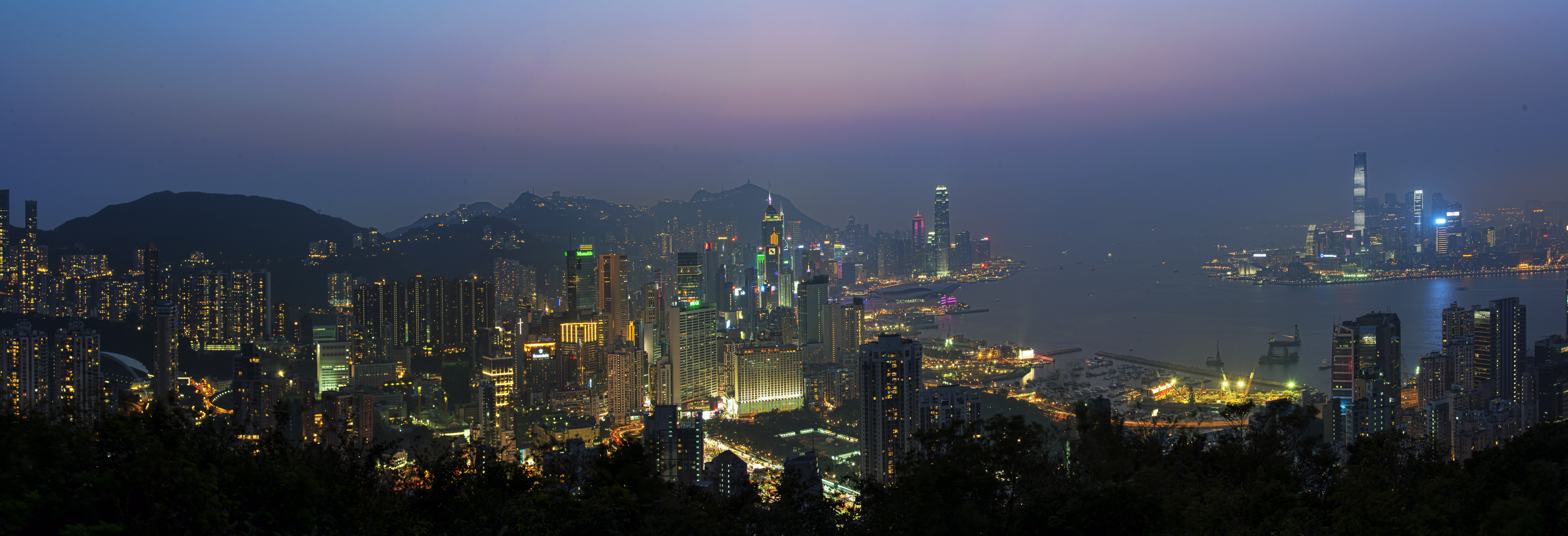
- View from Braemar Hill

Highest point
- Elevation: 200 m (660 ft)
- Coordinates: 22°17′11″N 114°12′23″E

Geography
- Location within Hong Kong
- Location: Hong Kong

Braemar Hill
- Traditional Chinese: 寶馬山
- Simplified Chinese: 宝马山
Transcriptions
Standard Mandarin
- Hanyu Pinyin: Bǎomǎ shān
Yue: Cantonese
- Jyutping: bou2 maa5 saan1

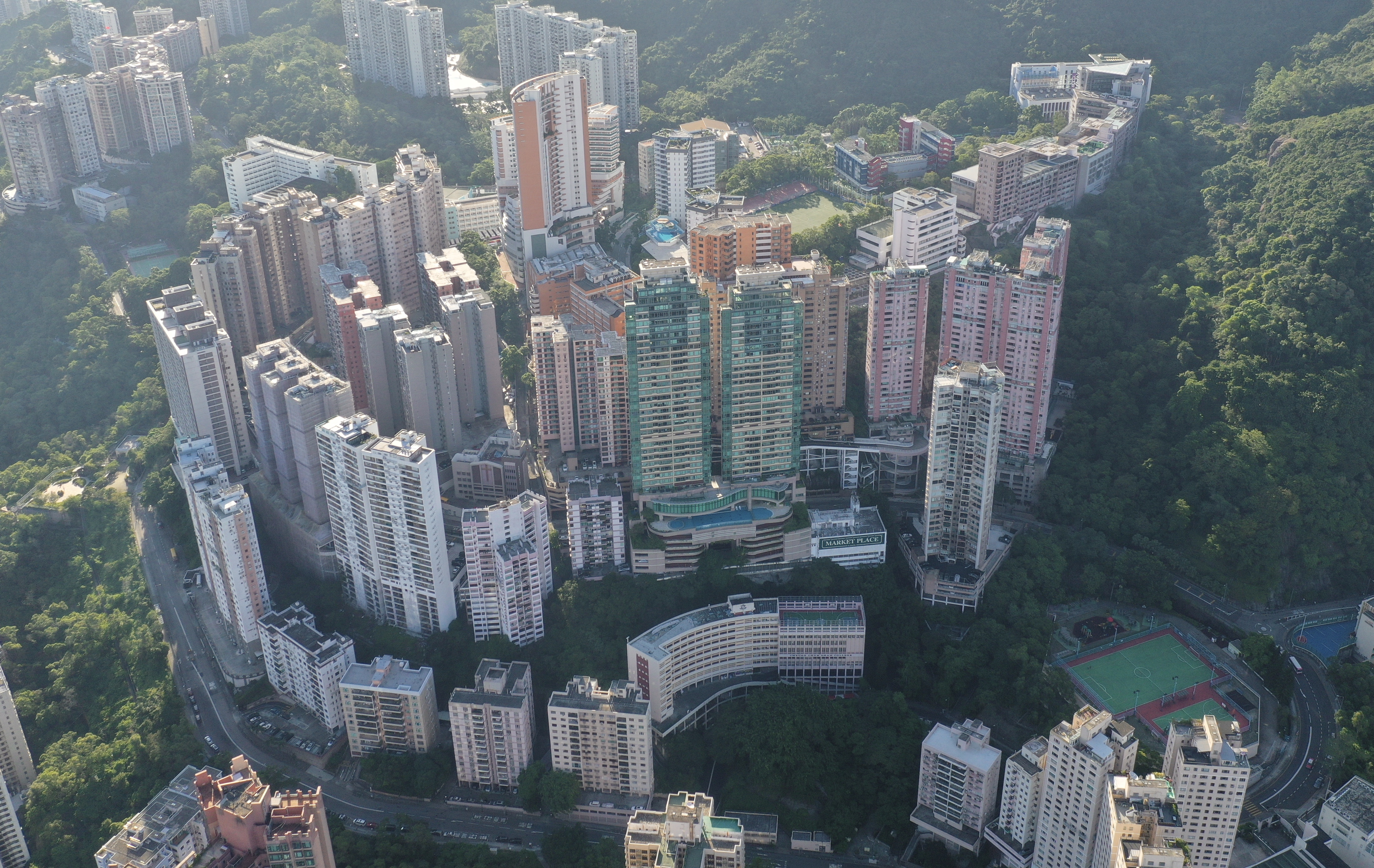
Residential area of Braemar Hill

Braemar Hill (Chinese: 寶馬山; Jyutping: bou2 maa5 saan1; Cantonese Yale: bóumáhsān) is a hill with a height of 200 metres (660 ft) south of Braemar Point on Hong Kong Island, Hong Kong. The hill was likely named after the Scottish village of Braemar by British officials.

Contrary to popular belief, the peak of Braemar Hill lies on the eastern end of Braemar Hill Road instead of the western end, where the ascent towards Red Incense Summit is noticeably steeper. Hikers often misidentify Red Incense Summit and nearby hilltops as the peak of Braemar Hill.

The north and western sides of this hill are largely residential, consisting primarily of private upmarket real estate. Because of its convenient location and high real estate prices, Braemar Hill is considered one of the more affluent neighbourhoods in the territory.

== Private housing developments ==
- Tempo Court (天寶大廈)
- Ho King View (豪景)
- Braemar Hill Mansions (賽西湖大廈)
- Sky Horizon (海天峰)
- Pacific Palisades (寶馬山花園)
- Kingsford Garden (瓊峯園)
- Wilshire Towers (慧雅閣)
- Braemar Heights
- Maiden Court (萬德閣)
- Broadview Terrace (雅景臺)
- Evelyn Towers (雲景台)
- Seaview Garden (海景台)
- Summit Court (雲峰大廈)
- Hilltop Mansion (峰景大廈)
- Hanking Court (恆景園)
- Coral Court (珊瑚閣)
- Sky Scraper (摩天大廈)
- Flora Garden (富麗園)
- Beverley Heights (富豪閣)
- Oxford Court (豐林閣)
- Viking Villas (威景臺)

== Education ==
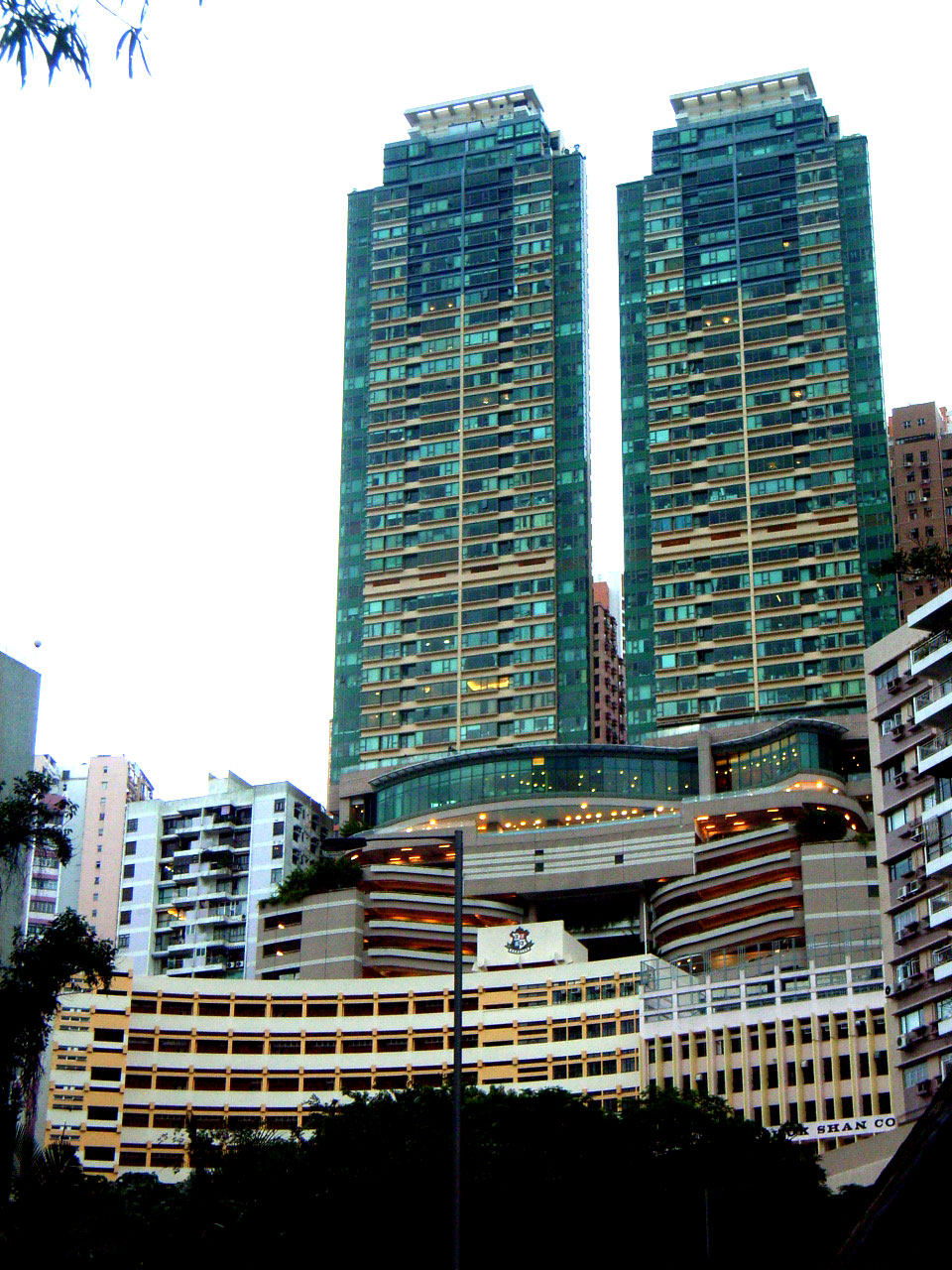
Sky Horizon luxury residence and Cheung Chuk Shan College on Cloud View Road (雲景道)

The area is home to a large number of schools, including one-third of the secondary schools in Eastern District.

=== Primary schools ===
- Building Contractors' Association School
- Chinese International School
- Quarry Bay School
- SKH St. Michael's Primary School

=== Secondary schools ===
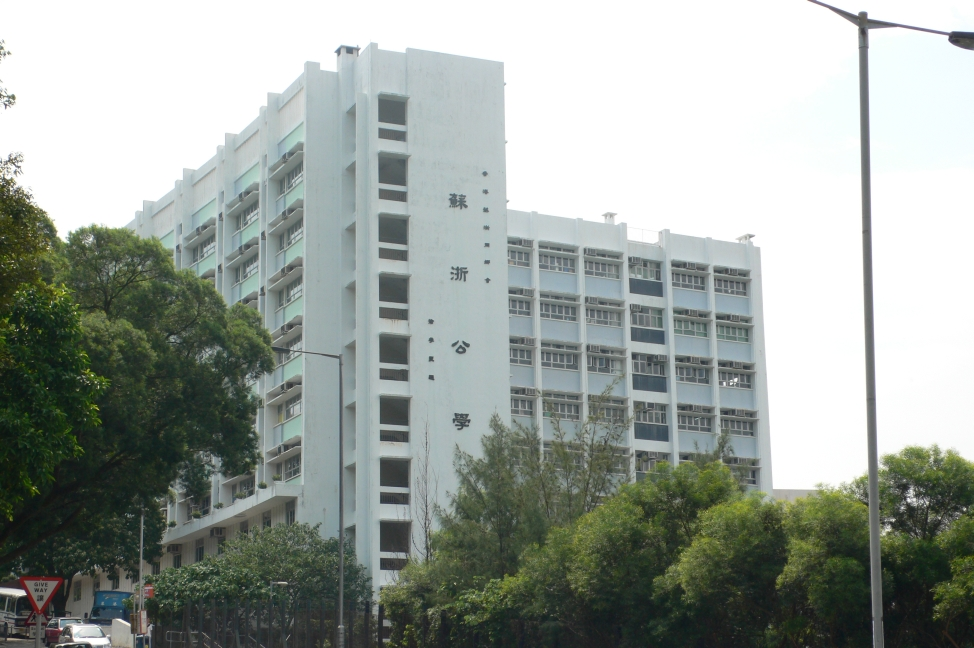
Kiangsu-Chekiang School

- Belilios Public School (government school)
- CCC Kwei Wah Shan Secondary School
- Cheung Chuk Shan College
- Chinese International School
- Clementi Secondary School
- Concordia Lutheran School, North Point
- Kiangsu-Chekiang College
- Man Kiu Secondary School
- Pui Kiu Middle School
- St. Joan of Arc Secondary School
- Tung Wah Group of Hospitals Lee Ching Dea Memorial College

Braemar Hill formerly had the Japanese International School, Hong Kong's junior high school section. In April 2018 the junior high school moved to the Happy Valley campus.

=== University ===
- Hong Kong Shue Yan University

== Parks ==
- Choi Sai Woo Park
- Tin Hau Temple Road Garden No. 2

== Transport ==
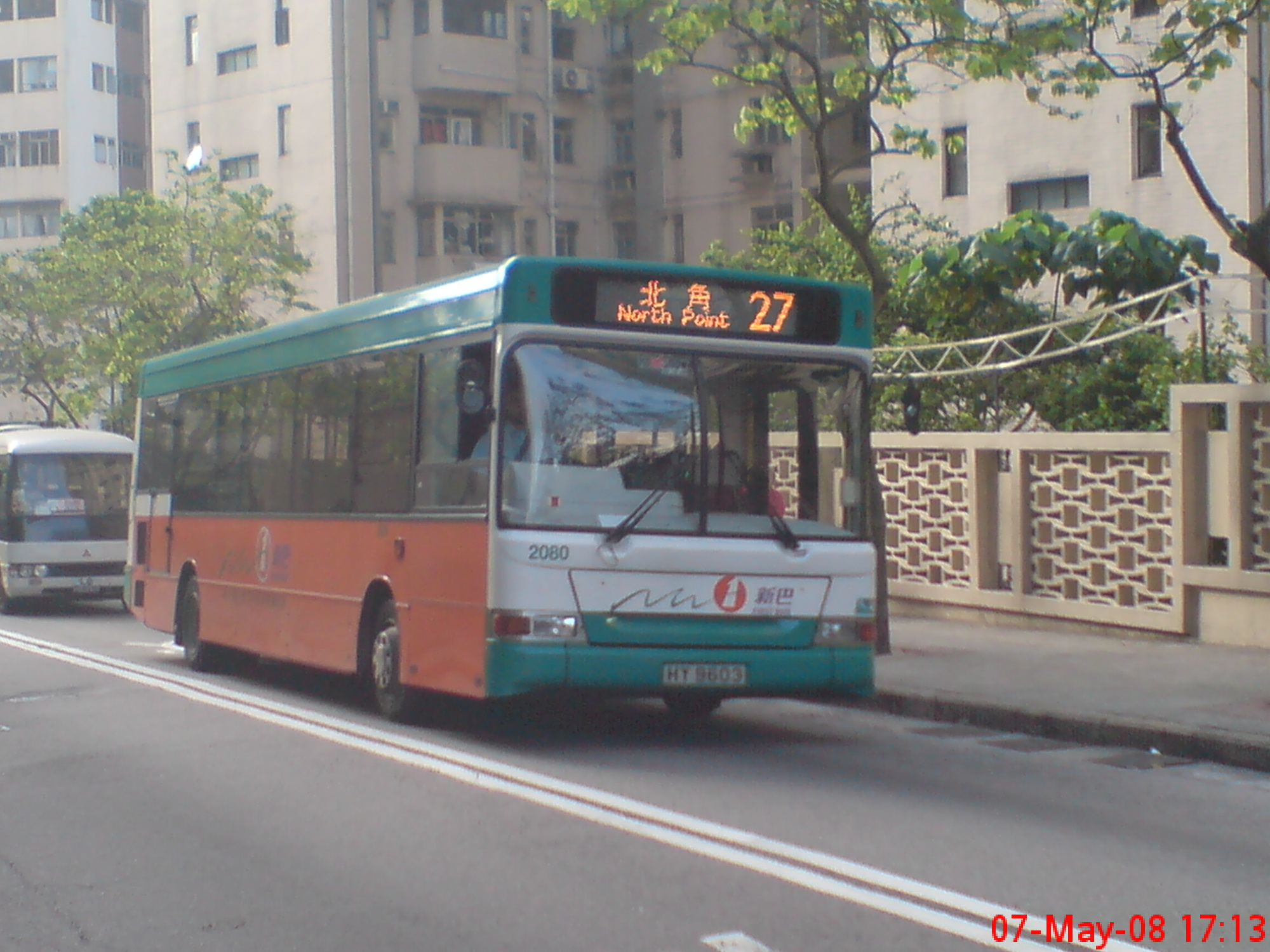
Bus no. 27

=== Buses ===
- 23B to Park Road
- 25 to Central Piers (circular)
- 25A to Exhibition Centre station (circular)
- 27 to North Point Ferry Pier
- 41A (special departure) from North Point Ferry Pier to Wah Fu Estate (via Braemar Hill)
- 81A from Hing Wah Estate to Lai Tak Tsuen (via Braemar Hill)
- 85 to Siu Sai Wan (Island Resort) (circular)
- 85A to Shau Kei Wan
- 85P to Siu Sai Wan (Island Resort)
- 108 to Kowloon Bay (Kai Yip Estate)

=== Minibuses ===
- 25 to Causeway Bay Paterson Street
- 49M to Tin Hau station

=== Pedestrian escalator system ===
In 2020, the Hong Kong Government proposed building a pedestrian link and escalator system between Braemar Hill and Fortress Hill, which has an MTR station. It would be akin to the Central–Mid-Levels escalator, albeit with gaps and more lifts. Currently under construction, the Highways Department currently estimates completion of the system in 2027.

== Nearby hills ==
- Mount Parker
- Jardine's Lookout
- The Peak
