= St. Joan of Arc Secondary School, Hong Kong =

Secondary school in Hong Kong

Coordinates: 22.28309°N 114.198879°E

St. Joan of Arc Secondary School
- 55 Braemar Hill Road, North Point

Information
- Type: Co-Educational
- Motto: Civic Responsibility
- Religious affiliation: Roman Catholic
- Established: 1955
- Principal: Mr. Yuen Cheung Oi
- Website: sja.edu.hk

St. Joan of Arc Secondary School, Hong Kong
- Traditional Chinese: 聖貞德中學
- Simplified Chinese: 圣贞德中学
- Jyutping: sing3 zing1 dak1 zung1 hok6
Transcriptions
Standard Mandarin
- Hanyu Pinyin: Shèng Zhēndé Zhōngxué
Yue: Cantonese
- Jyutping: sing3 zing1 dak1 zung1 hok6

St. Joan of Arc Secondary School (SJA, Chinese: 聖貞德中學) is a Roman Catholic co-educational school founded in 1955 by a group of Catholic women who graduated from the University of Hong Kong.

Chinese is the primary medium of instruction in St. Joan of Arc Secondary School. English is the language of instruction only for Non-Chinese Students (NCS). Most of the NSS subjects are taught in Chinese.

In Chinese Language classes, Cantonese is the medium of instruction.

St. Joan of Arc Secondary School is currently located in Braemar Hill, North Point, Hong Kong Island, Hong Kong.

== Class structure ==
There are three classes from Form I to VI.

All classes are named after a Christian virtue: Faith, Hope, Charity, Justice, Wisdom and Courage. At present, only "Faith", "Hope" "Charity" are used for naming the classes.

== Facilities ==
There are 31 air-conditioned classrooms and 15 special rooms fully equipped with IT facilities. There are also a chapel, a playground, a school hall, a student-activity centre, a lecture hall, a multimedia learning centre, a library fully equipped with IT facilities, a newly designed music room and a visual art room in our school. In terms of sport facilities, there is a football pitch, basketball court and a multifunctional indoor sport ground.

== School organisation ==
- Past Students' Association
- Parent-Teacher Association
- Campus TV

=== Student councils ===
- Students' Union
- Students' Representative Council
- SJA Fund Committee (Students' Working Team)
- Prefect Council
- Monitor Council
- Librarian Council
- IT Prefect Council
- Club Chairman Council

=== Extra-curricular activities ===
Religion
- Catholic Society
Academic
- Chinese Society
- English Society
- Mathematics Society
- Liberal Studies Society
- Science Society
- Humanities Education Society
- Information Technology Society
- Visual Arts Society
- Music Society
- Physical Education Society
Interest
- Chess Society
- Karate Society
- Magic Society
- Photography Society
- Model Making Society
- Environmental Protection Society
- Drama Society
- Shooting Club
- STEM Society
- Choir
Uniform Groups, Training & Services
- Hong Kong Air Cadet Corps 105 Squadron
- 48th Hong Kong Group Scout Troop
- Hong Kong Red Cross Youth Unit 16
- Junior Police Call
- Social Service Group
- Award for Young People
