= Bernard Chan =

Bernard Chan may refer to:

- Bernard Chan (swimmer) (born 1946), Olympic swimmer from Singapore
- Bernard Chan Pak-li (born 1977), politician from Hong Kong
- Bernard Charnwut Chan (born 1965), politician and businessman from Hong Kong
