= Braemar Hill Mansions =

Housing estate in Hong Kong

Coordinates: 22.285525°N 114.199618°E

Braemar Hill Mansions
賽西湖大廈
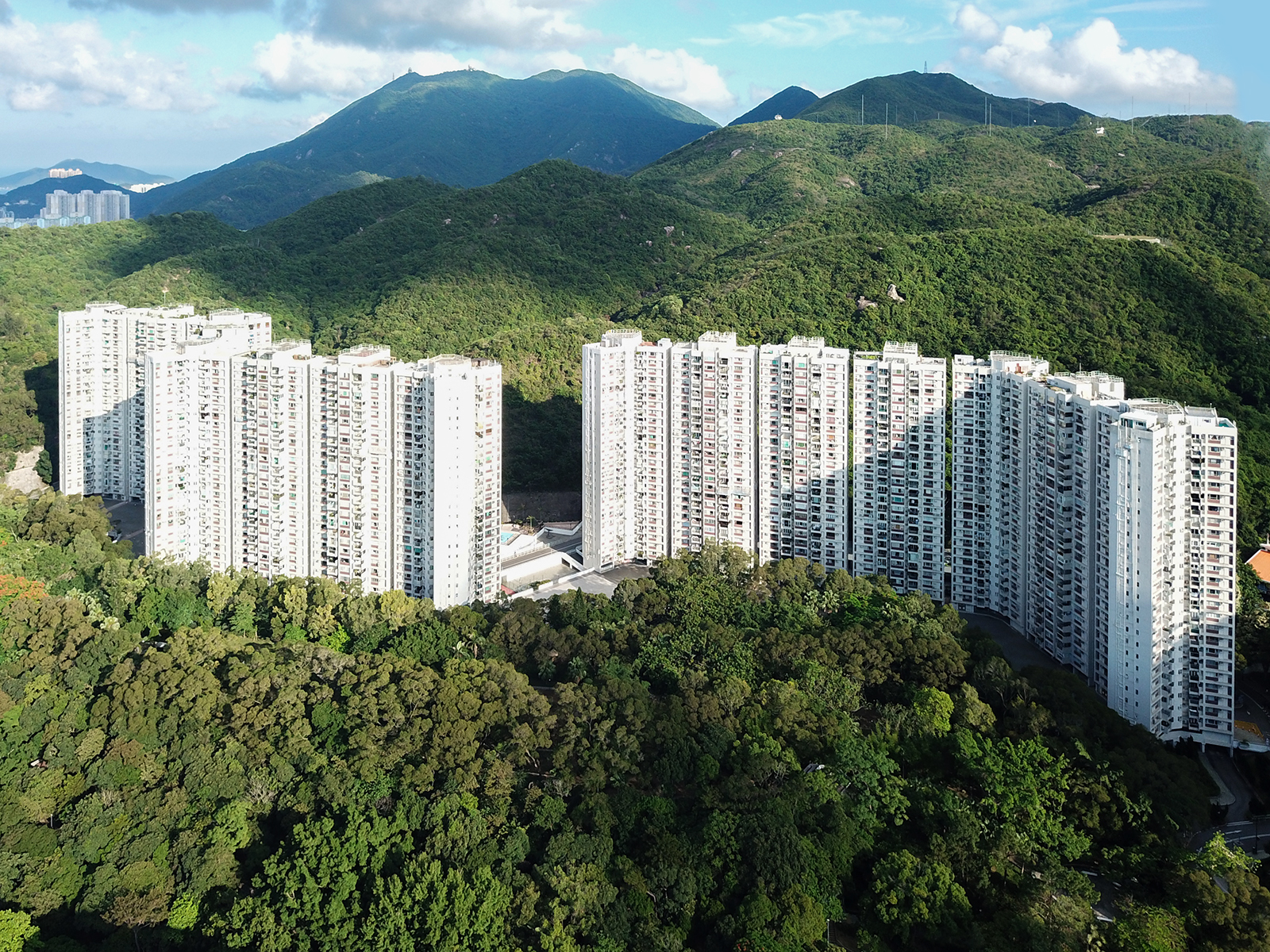
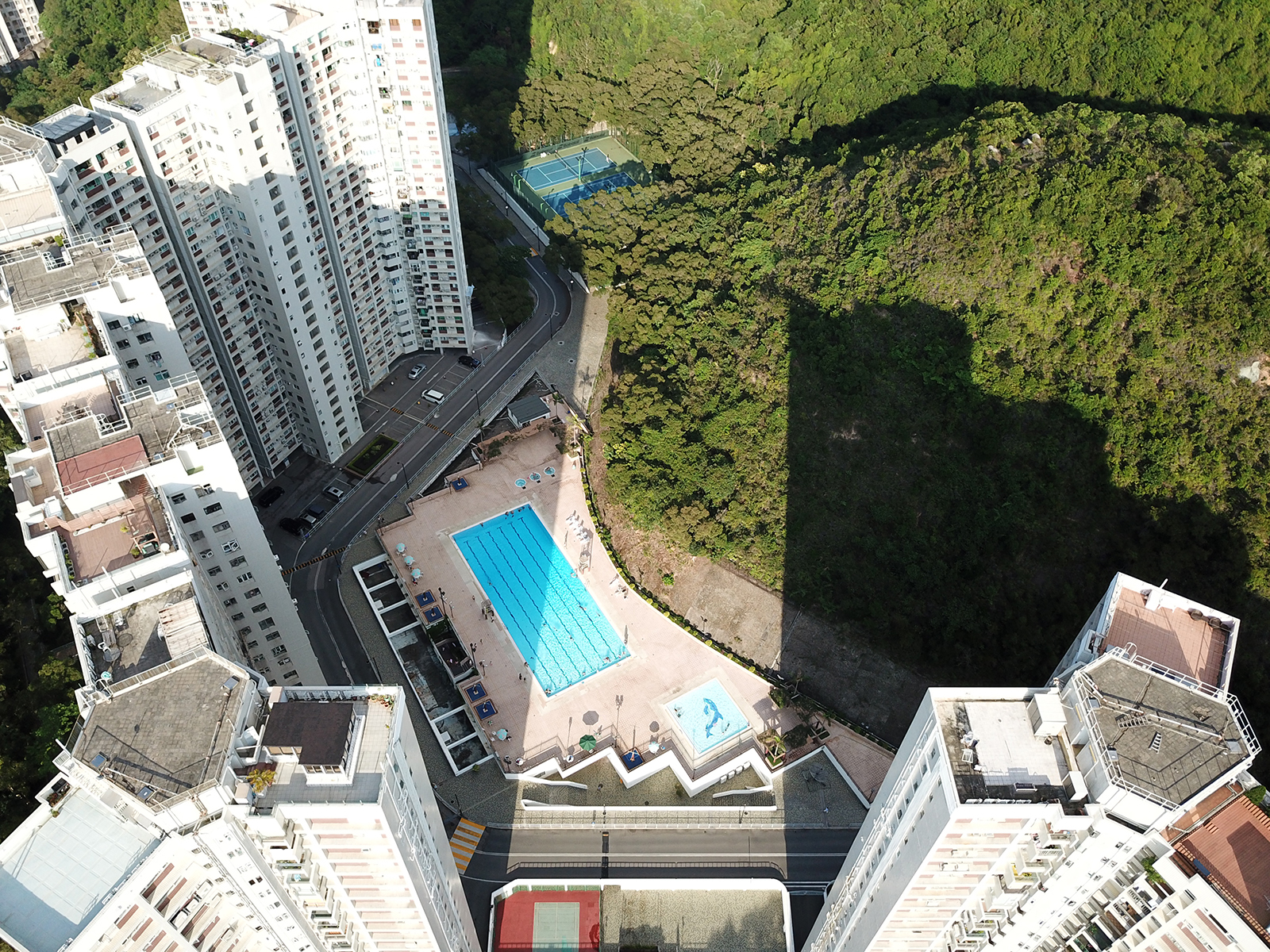
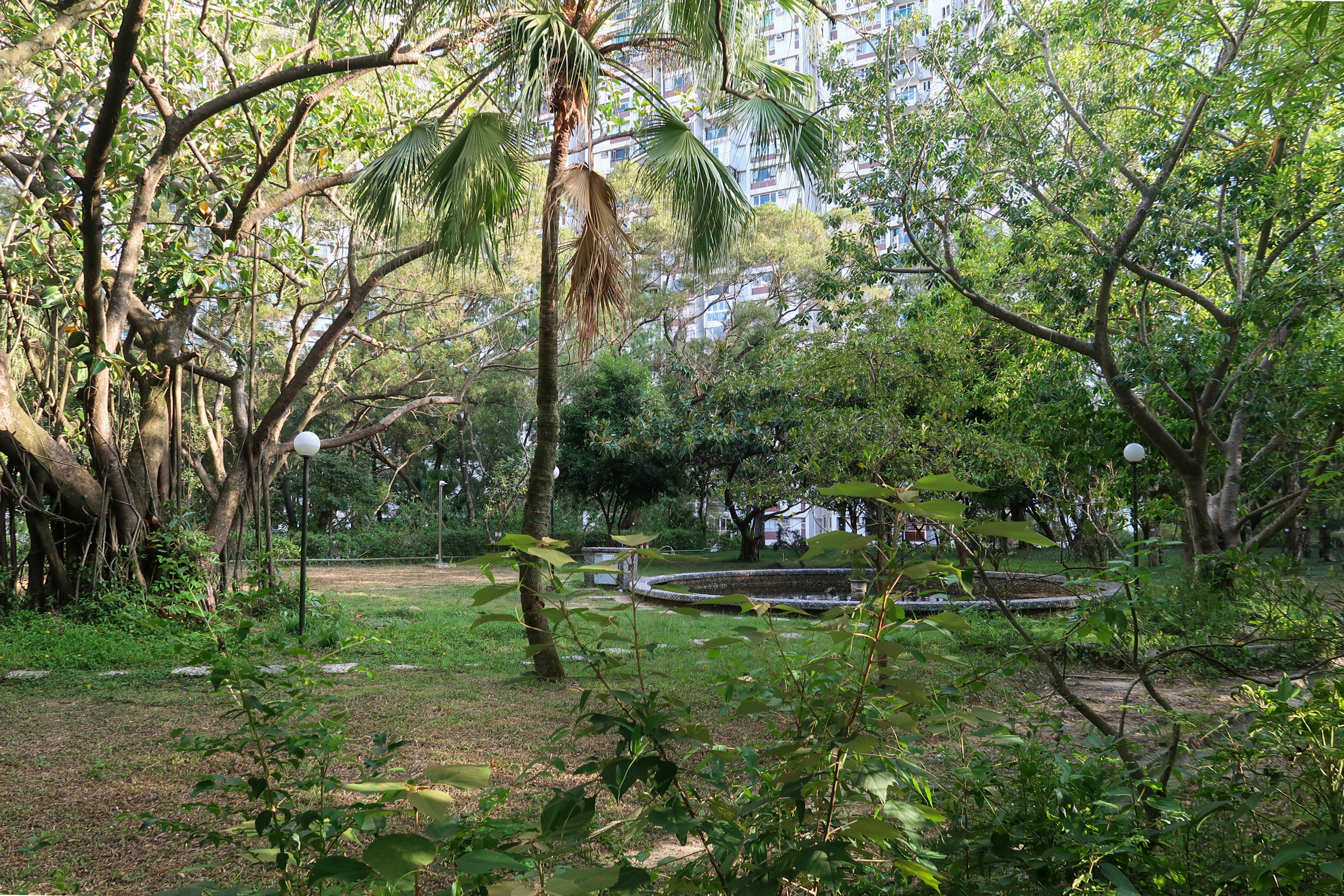
Views of Braemar Hill Mansions in May 2018

Braemar Hill Mansions (Chinese: 賽西湖大廈) is a large-scale private housing estate located on 15–43 Braemar Hill Road in Braemar Hill, North Point, Hong Kong (Apple Daily 2010). It was developed by Cheung Kong Holdings (Apple Daily 2010) and was completed in February 1978 (Centadata). The housing estate was constructed at the site of a former reservoir, which was purchased by Li Ka-shing from Swire Group in the 1970s (曹 2015).

The housing estate is composed of 15 tower blocks of 25 floors each and has a total of 925 apartments, including three different apartment layouts (Apple Daily 2010, Ming Pao 2011, Centadata). The most common layout, with a total of 525 apartments, has an area of 1260 square feet and includes 3 bedrooms, with 3 apartments per floor of each tower block. The other two layouts, with 200 apartments each, have areas of 1490 and 1640 square feet and includes 3 and 4 bedrooms respectively, with 2 apartments per floor of each tower block (Apple Daily 2010).

The housing estate provides facilities including an outdoor swimming pool, a car park, and a shopping centre. Adjacent to the housing estate is the Choi Sai Woo Park, an urban park of which 80% of its area is exclusive for residents of the housing estate (Apple Daily 2010, Ming Pao 2011). Minibus service is provided to North Point and Causeway Bay city centres (Apple Daily 2010).

Due to its location near the top of Braemar Hill, the views from the apartments, and estate facilities, the housing estate has earned a reputation as a classic example of luxury property in the North Point area of Hong Kong (Apple Daily 2010, The Sun 2014). The windows of the apartments do not include window sills, and the apartment layouts allow efficient utilization, making the housing estate popular among Hong Kong people. Demand is high, and the prices of apartments in the housing estate have remained at a relatively high level (Apple Daily 2010, Ming Pao 2011).
