= Noel Croucher =

British businessman and philanthropist

Noel Croucher JP
- Born: 24 December 1891; Eastleigh, Hampshire, England
- Died: 6 March 1980 (aged 88)
- Occupation(s): businessman philanthropist
- Spouse: Simmonne Croucher
- Children: 1

Noel Croucher JP (24 December 1891 – 6 March 1980) was a British businessman and philanthropist who served as chairman of the Hong Kong Stock Exchange and was on the board of directors for Green Island Cement and The Hong Kong and China Gas Company. He established an academic charity, the Croucher Foundation, the year before his death.

== Biography ==
Croucher was born on 24 December 1891 in Eastleigh, Hampshire. In 1905 he moved to British Hong Kong with his mother, stepfather, and siblings.

At the age of fifteen he began working as a clerk in the Hong Kong Post Office. He caught the attention of Sir Catchick Paul Chater, who helped him start out in business. In 1911 he joined the trading firm Tomes & Company. After four years in trading he moved to a brokerage firm called Benjamin & Potts.

Croucher joined the Hong Kong Volunteer Defense Corps and was made an officer at the beginning of World War I. He was sent to the British-leased territory of Weihaiwei in China as a recruiter for the Chinese Labour Corps, to help on the Western Front. He was later stationed in France where he met his future wife, Simonne. They married in London in 1924. In 1925 they had a son, Richard Roderic Croucher, who was born in Hong Kong. Croucher and his wife later separated, and she moved back to London during World War II.

In the 1935 he established Croucher & Company and obtained a seat on the board of the Hong Kong Stock Exchange. He served on the board of directors of Green Island Cement and The Hong Kong and China Gas Company.

He was appointed Vice Commodore of the Royal Hong Kong Yacht Club in 1937.

During the Japanese occupation of Hong Kong, Croucher was interned in a prison camp. While imprisoned, his wealth stayed intact and, upon his release, he was considered one of "the richest white men East of Suez". He played an important role in the restoration of the Royal Hong Kong Yacht Club and the Hong Kong Stock Exchange. He was appointed as chairman of the stock exchange in 1947.

He was a patron of the Sandy Bay Children's Hospital.

In 1979 Croucher created the Croucher Foundation, an academic charity funding educational programs for natural science, technology, and medicine in Hong Kong. Alexander Todd, Baron Todd was appointed as the founding President of the foundation. When Croucher died in 1980, he left a large endowment to the foundation.
