= Murder of Li Sin-heng =

2017 murder in Hong Kong

- Date: September 16, 2017; 8 years ago
- Location: Hong Kong
- Type: Murder by stabbing
- Perpetrator: Ng Yan-kin
- Deaths: 1
- Verdict: Guilty
- Convictions: Murder
- Sentence: Life imprisonment

On 16 September 2017 at around 4 p.m. HKT, Annie Li Sin-heng (Chinese: 李倩姮, born 29 July 1997), a student from Hong Kong Polytechnic University (PolyU), was murdered by Ng Yan-kin (Chinese: 吳欣鍵, born 1995) on board a Cross-Harbour route 118 bus operated by Citybus. Ng stabbed Li with a sharp knife 33 times on the upper deck while the bus was travelling along Chai Wan Road, then stabbed himself, smashed open a window with an emergency hammer and jumped out onto the ground.

After the police and paramedics arrived, Ng was found lying on the sidewalk, and was sent to the hospital in critical condition. Another ambulance arrived later and sent Li, who was not breathing, to the hospital where she died from her injuries. Police investigated the case as a murder caused by a relationship dispute, and arrested Ng shortly after the incident. Ng was eventually convicted of murder on 8 December 2020, and sentenced to life imprisonment on 29 April 2021.

== Background ==
Ng Yan-kin, who was 22 years old at the time of the murder, lived in Sau Mau Ping Estate in Kwun Tong District, and had just graduated from PolyU with a degree in civil engineering. According to Ng's father, Ng had started working as an engineer in July 2017 in Ho Man Tin. Annie Li Sin-heng, who was 20 years old at the time of her murder, lived in Siu Sai Wan in Eastern District. She was studying at PolyU as a year 3 nursing student.

Li and Ng had been dating for around a year. Ng described Li as independent and caring, stating that knowing her was "like winning the Mark Six". However, Li considered Ng to be a possessive boyfriend who would become jealous of her when she was around other men. In the early hours on the day of the murder, Li and Ng had a dispute over several issues, including the destruction of several intimate video clips, and Li had told Ng she was breaking up with him. The parents of both Li and Ng knew very little about their relationship, and Ng's parents had not met Li.

== Incident ==
Ng and Li boarded a route 118 bus at Siu Sai Wan (Island Resort) Public Transport Terminus and went directly to the rear seats of the upper deck. According to a passenger seated at the front of the upper deck, whispers were heard coming from the rear. A few minutes later, after the bus departed from the Fu Shing Court stop (Chinese: 富城阁) along Chai Wan Road, the same passenger heard vomiting sounds, and turned around to see Li coughing up blood. Another passenger shouted to the bus driver that someone had been stabbed. Ng, who was holding the knife, stabbed himself in the chest and abdomen, and warned other passengers to not come near him. Around the same time, a passer-by heard a loud noise and saw Ng smashing open a window with an emergency hammer and jumping out onto the ground before losing consciousness, with passengers rushing out of the bus in a panic.

Li was found on the upper deck having been stabbed 33 times in her arms, neck, chest and back, with major loss of blood from the chest and neck. She was taken to Pamela Youde Nethersole Eastern Hospital, with paramedics performing CPR throughout the journey. She died from her injuries after reaching Eastern Hospital. Ng, who was lying on the sidewalk unconscious, had been severely injured from his fall from the upper deck, and was also sent to Eastern Hospital. After a successful operation, Ng was transferred to the intensive care unit for observation.

Police arrived at the scene, some carrying shields, and locked down the stretch of Chai Wan Road where the incident took place. Detectives who entered the bus found a 11-inch (28 cm) long knife on a seat near the shattered window. Bloodstains were also found nearby, along with some clothing and a paper bag recovered from the scene, as well as a bloodied watch on the pavement.

== Aftermath ==
Citybus offered their condolences regarding the incident, and stated they would cooperate with the investigation. The bus involved was sent back to the depot, and representatives from the company assisted police in reviewing the closed-circuit television footage. After the investigation was completed, the bus was cleaned and had its windows replaced, and returned to service 8 days after the incident.

On 10 August 2023, nearly 6 years later, the same bus, coincidentally also on route 118, was involved in an accident when it crashed into a lorry along Tonkin Street in Cheung Sha Wan. The lorry driver was trapped and had to be extricated by firefighters.

== Legal proceedings ==
Ng was arrested on suspicion of murder a few hours after the accident. A hearing was scheduled on 18 September at the Eastern Magistrate's Court, but as Ng's condition worsened and he had to remain in hospital, the hearing was delayed several times. The hearing was first held on 18 October 2017, with Ng appearing in court in a wheelchair. The hearing ended with another scheduled on 13 December while awaiting Li's autopsy results, toxicology reports and Ng's medical reports. Several more hearings took place on 7 February and 21 March in 2018. The police continued detaining Ng during this process.

The case went to court on 20 October 2020, with Ng pleading guilty to the charge of manslaughter but not guilty to the charge of murder, instead claiming mental instability. The prosecution rejected these claims, pointing out the accused had bought a knife at a shop in Island Resort prior to boarding the bus, indicating he had planned to kill or cause major bodily harm to Li beforehand.

The trial concluded on 8 December 2020, with the jury finding Ng guilty of one count of murder. Judge Audrey Campbell-Moffat indicated that while the only possible sentence for murder in Hong Kong was life imprisonment, the case would still be adjourned to 14 January 2021 to give the defendant some time to plead his case. On 29 April 2021, Ng was sentenced to life imprisonment for murder.
