= SGSS =

SGSS may refer to:

- Shau Kei Wan Government Secondary School, a secondary school in Shau Kei Wan, Hong Kong
- Space Network Ground Segment Sustainment, a follow-on project to the Tracking and Data Relay Satellite System (TDRSS)
- St. Gabriel's Secondary School, a secondary school in Serangoon, Singapore
- Śūraṅgama Samādhi Sūtra
