= Shau Kei Wan East Government Secondary School =

Hong Kong secondary school

Coordinates: 22.272649°N 114.232124°E

Shau Kei Wan East Government Secondary School (SKWEGSS)
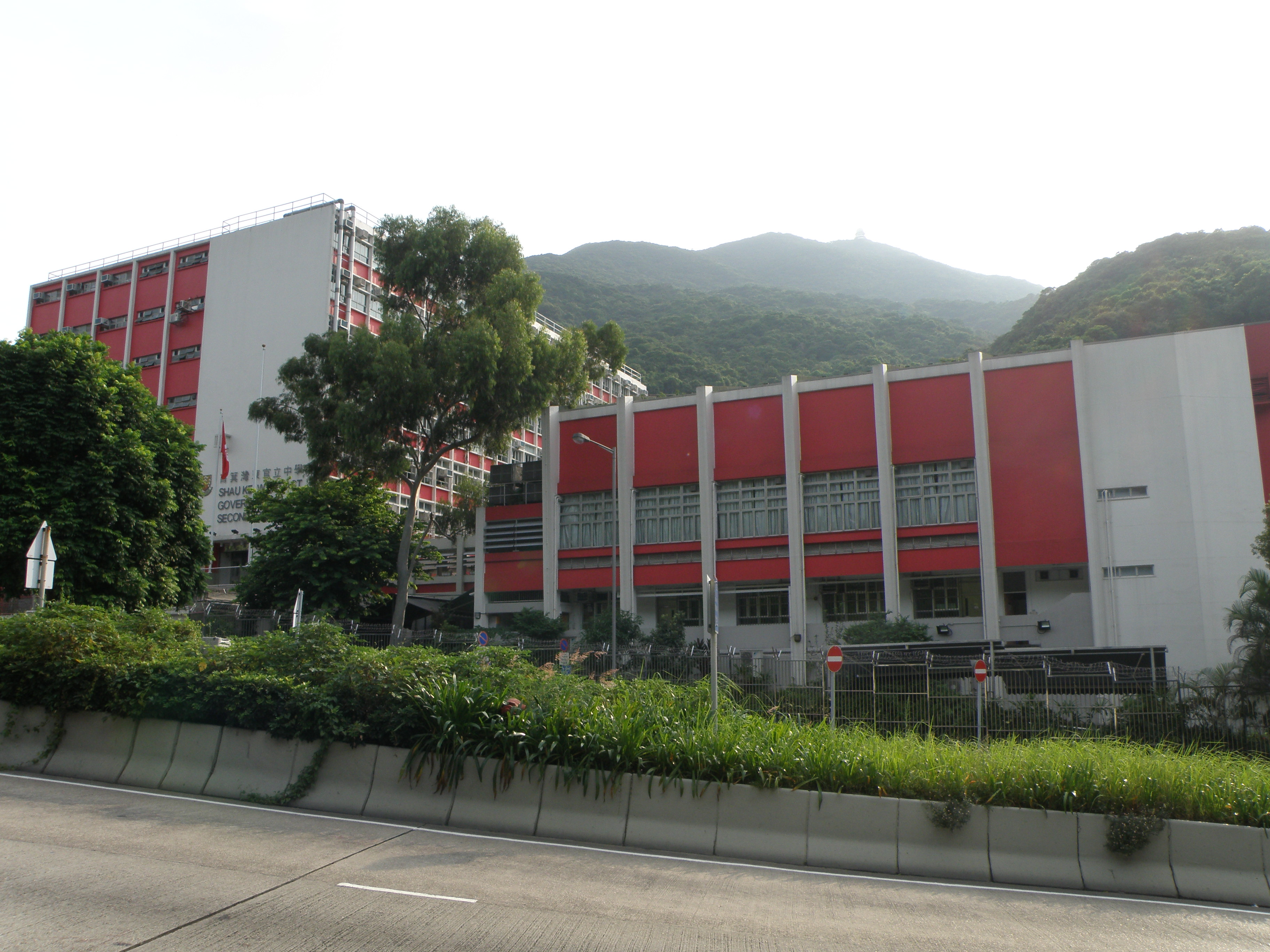
- Shau Kei Wan East Government Secondary School

Location
- 40 Chai Wan Road, Shau Kei Wan, Hong Kong

Information
- Motto: Through broad learning to develop benevolence
- Established: 1963; 63 years ago
- Principal: Ms. Tang Tze Kwan, Teresa
- Enrollment: 244
- Language: Chinese
- Website: https://www.skwegss.edu.hk/

Shau Kei Wan East Government Secondary School
- Traditional Chinese: 筲箕灣東官立中學
- Simplified Chinese: 筲箕湾东官立中学
Transcriptions
Standard Mandarin
- Hanyu Pinyin: Shāojīwān Dōng Guānlì Zhōngxué
Yue: Cantonese
- Jyutping: saau1 gei1 waan1 dung1 gun1 laap6 zung1 hok6

Shau Kei Wan East Government Secondary School (SKWEGSS, Chinese: 筲箕灣東官立中學) is a co-educational secondary school operated by the Government of Hong Kong in Hong Kong. Located in Shau Kei Wan, there are a total of 25 classrooms and 17 special rooms with a student enrollment of 660. The school was founded in 1963 and its medium of instruction is Chinese.

== History ==
The school was established in 1963 and was originally named Shau Kei Wan Government Technical Secondary School and the courses included technical subjects. At that time, it temporarily shared the buildings of Hill Road Primary School and Tanner Road Police Government Primary School were used as temporary school buildings. Later, the Danish government funded the establishment of a permanent school building on Chai Wan Road, which was completed and opened in 1965. The completion marked the school officially providing education for school children in the district.

In 1993, the school held their athletic meet at Wan Chai Sports Ground.

In the 1990s, Hong Kong's industry moved northwards, and the demand for industrial talents began to decrease. In response to the needs of the society, the school changed its name from Shau Kei Wan Government Technical Secondary School to Shau Kei Wan East Government Secondary School on 1 September 1998, which provides subjects in liberal arts, sciences, engineering, and commerce, and marked the beginning of a new era.

During the 2019–20 protests, students of three neighbouring schools in Shau Kei Wan – namely SKWEGSS, Shau Kei Wan Government Secondary School, and Salesian English School – organised a joint protest in support of a citywide strike in November 2019. They walked silently to school with protest banners, before chanting protest slogans such as "five demands, not one less!" (Chinese: 五大訴求，缺一不可) and "Hong Kongers, revenge!" (香港人，報仇), the latter a reference to the recent death of Chow Tsz-lok.

On 25 November 2020, Li, a 14-year-old Form Two boy, died after being drowned while playing in the water with seven other classmates in Shek O Beach.

== Notable alumni ==
- Pinky Lai – automotive designer
- Wong You-nam – actor
- Ng Chau-pei – former chairman of the Hong Kong Federation of Trade Unions (HKFTU)
- Anna Lo – Alliance Party politician in Northern Ireland
- Wallace Chung Hon-leung – actor
- Cheung Ming-man – singer and occasional actor
- Andrew Chiu – politician, member of the Tai Koo Shing West constituency of the Eastern District Council

== See also ==
- Education in Hong Kong
- List of secondary schools in Hong Kong
