= Shau Kei Wan Government Secondary School =

Hong Kong secondary school

Coordinates: 22.271591°N 114.232682°E

Shau Kei Wan Government Secondary School (SGSS)
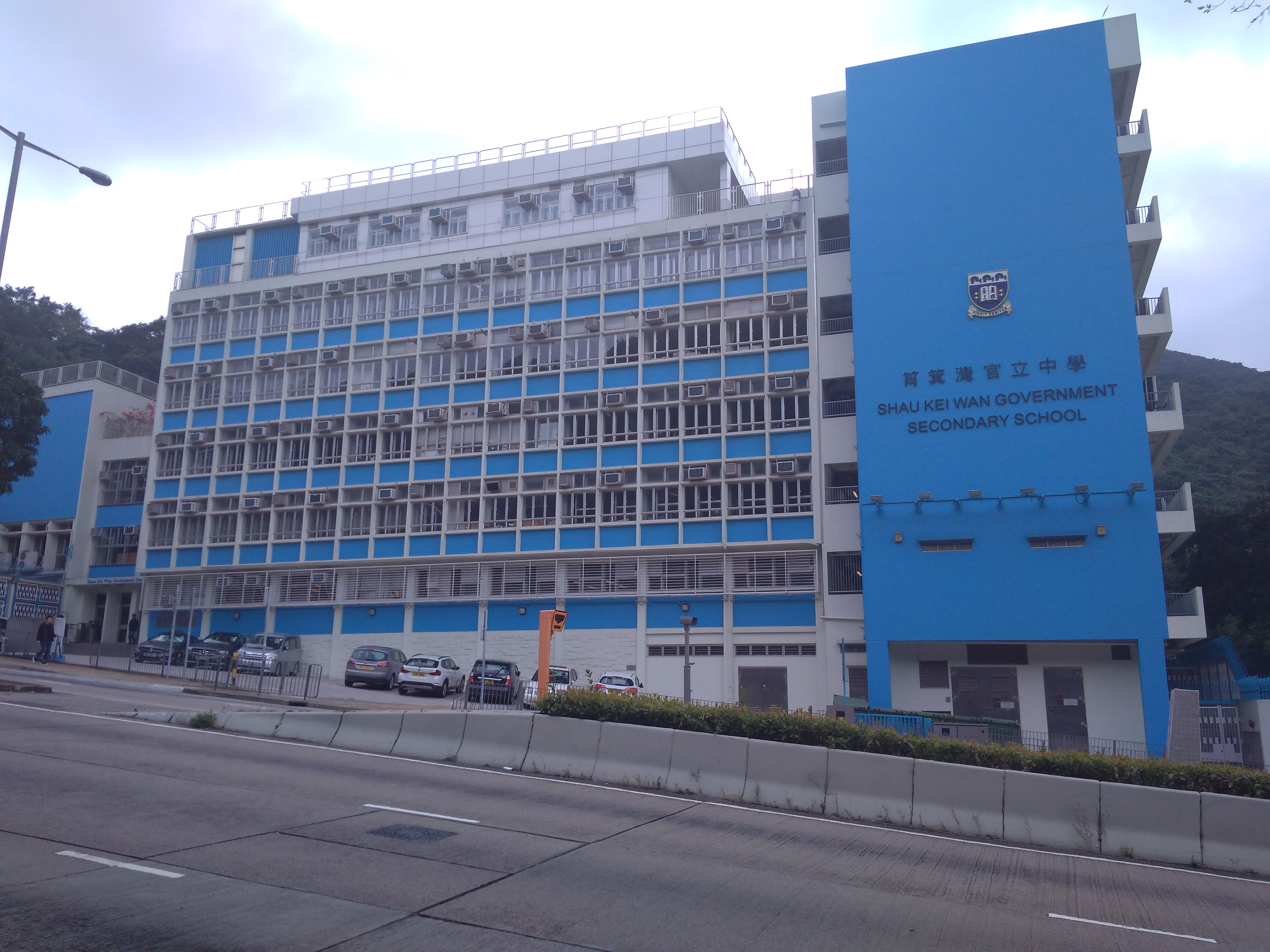
- Shau Kei Wan Government Secondary School

Location
- 42 Chai Wan Road, Chai Wan Gap, Hong Kong

Information
- Motto: VINCIT VERITAS
- Established: 1961; 65 years ago
- Enrollment: 1128
- Language: English
- Website: http://www.sgss.edu.hk/

Shau Kei Wan Government Secondary School
- Traditional Chinese: 筲箕灣官立中學
- Simplified Chinese: 筲箕湾官立中学
Transcriptions
Standard Mandarin
- Hanyu Pinyin: Shāojīwān Guānlì Zhōngxué
Yue: Cantonese
- Jyutping: saau1 gei1 waan1 gun1 laap6 zung1 hok6

Shau Kei Wan Government Secondary School (SGSS, Chinese: 筲箕灣官立中學) is a co-educational grammar school operated by the Government of Hong Kong in Hong Kong. Located in Chai Wan Gap, the school was founded in 1961 and its medium of instruction is English.

== History ==
It was established in 1961. It temporarily shared the building of Clementi Middle School in Fortress Hill. The current school campus on Chai Wan Road opened in the autumn of 1964. The school building was designed by the Architectural Office of the former Public Works Department, and cost HK$2,707,200.

During the 2019–20 protests, students of three neighbouring schools on Chai Wan Road – namely SGSS, Shau Kei Wan East Government Secondary School, and Salesian English School – organised a joint protest in support of a citywide strike in November 2019. They walked silently to school with protest banners, before chanting protest slogans such as "Five Demands, Not One Less" (Chinese: 五大訴求，缺一不可) and "Hong Kongers, revenge!" (香港人，報仇), the latter a reference to the recent death of Chow Tsz-lok.

In February 2021, during the COVID-19 pandemic, around 130 form six students and 10 staff members of Shau Kei Wan Government Secondary School were sent to quarantine after spending time in an examination hall with two students who were later found to be infected. The incident prompted some Hong Kong educators to question whether schools should aim to fully reopen.

== Notable alumni ==
- Andrew Chiu – politician
- Frederick Fung – politician
- Lee Chik-yuet – politician
- Joseph Lee Kok Long (李國麟) – legislator of the Health Services functional constituency; assistant professor in the Department of Nursing at the Open University of Hong Kong
- Alan Tam Wing Lun (譚詠麟) – Cantopop singer
