= Youth Square =

Youth centre in Chai Wan, Hong Kong

- 青年廣場
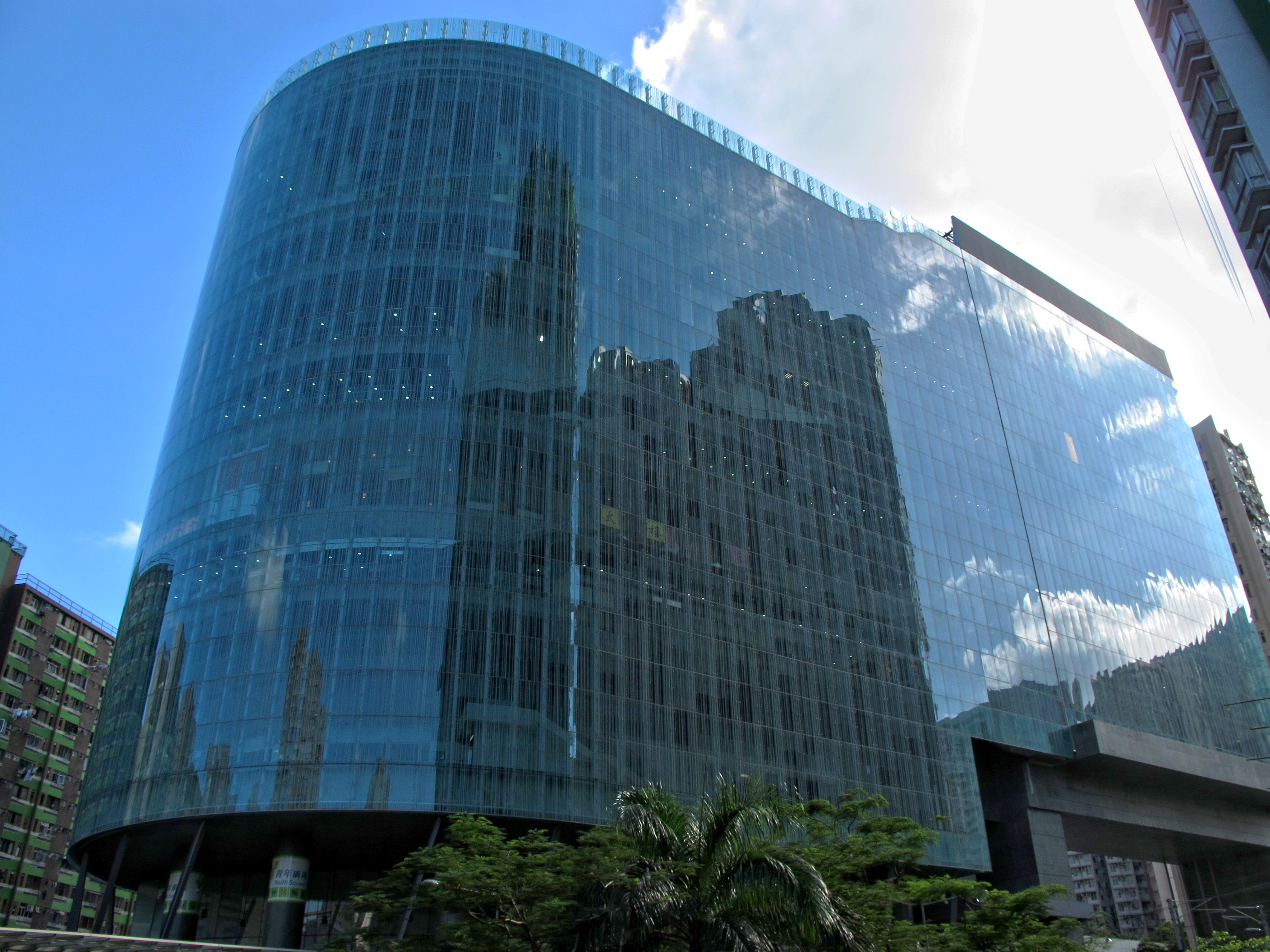
- Youth Square, as seen from the footbridge on Chai Wan Road, Chai Wan in July 2010
- Interactive map of the Youth Square area
- Former names: Hong Kong Centre for Youth Development

General information
- Location: 238 Chai Wan Road, Chai Wan, Hong Kong
- Coordinates: 22°15′46.76″N 114°14′12.21″E
- Construction started: June 2001; 24 years ago
- Completed: November 2008; 17 years ago
- Opened: 6 March 2010; 15 years ago
- Client: Hong Kong Government
- Owner: Home Affairs Bureau of Hong Kong Government

Technical details
- Floor count: 15

Website
- http://www.youthsquare.hk/

Youth Square (Chinese: 青年廣場), formerly known as Hong Kong Centre for Youth Development (香港青年發展中心) is a youth activities complex in Hong Kong. It is located at 238 Chai Wan Road, Chai Wan on Hong Kong Island. It is owned by Home Affairs Bureau of Hong Kong Government. The construction of Youth Square commenced in June 2001 and was completed in November 2008. The building is managed and operated by New World Facilities Management Company Limited since 2010.

== Events ==
Youth Square has been conducting a range of activities for the youth under the theme of "Music & Dance”, “Arts & Culture” and “Community Engagement”.

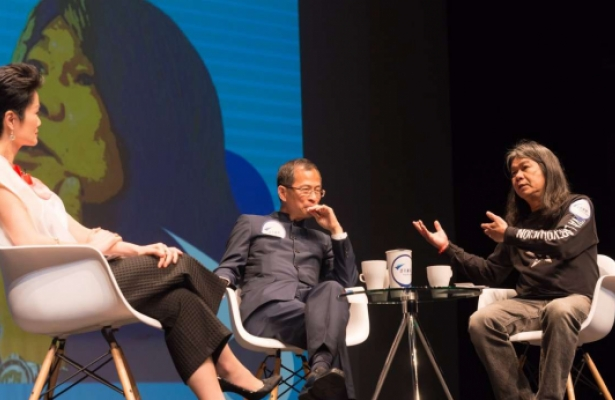
Glocal Fellowship Celebrity Salon (April 2016).

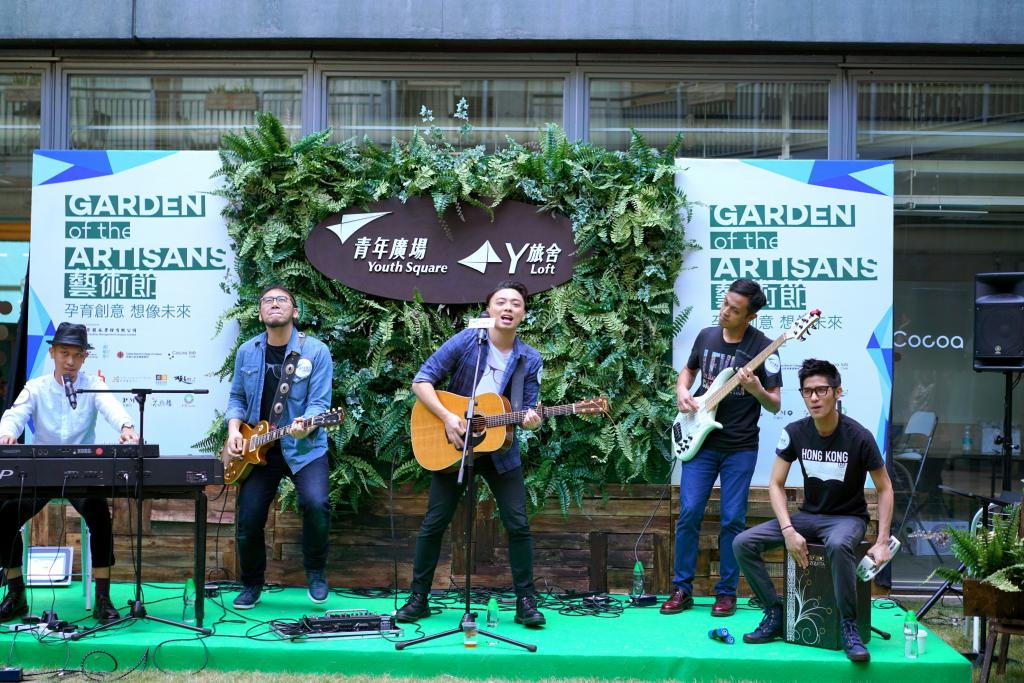
Garden of the Artisans Festival (January 2017).

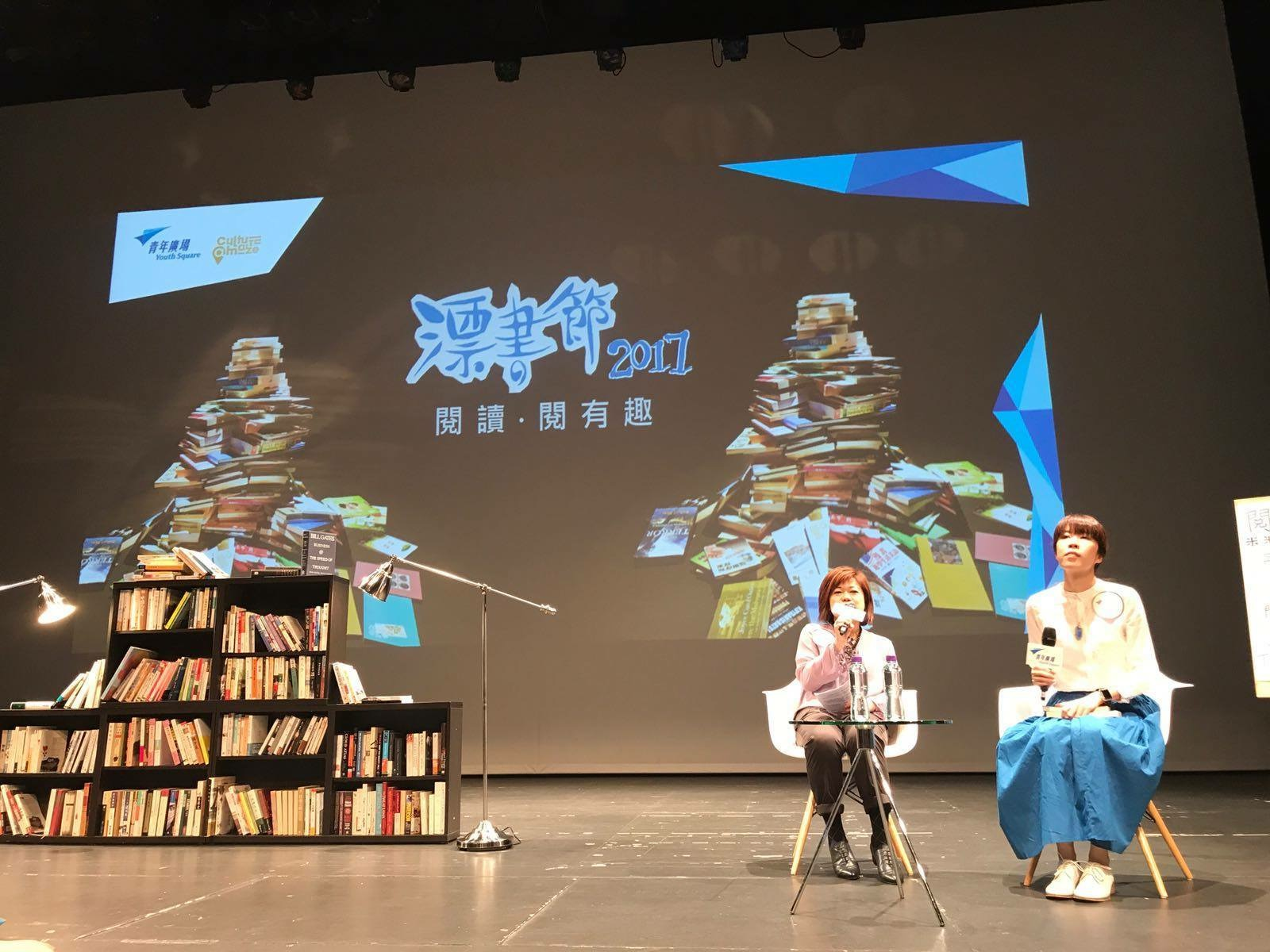
Book Crossing 2017 (July 2017).

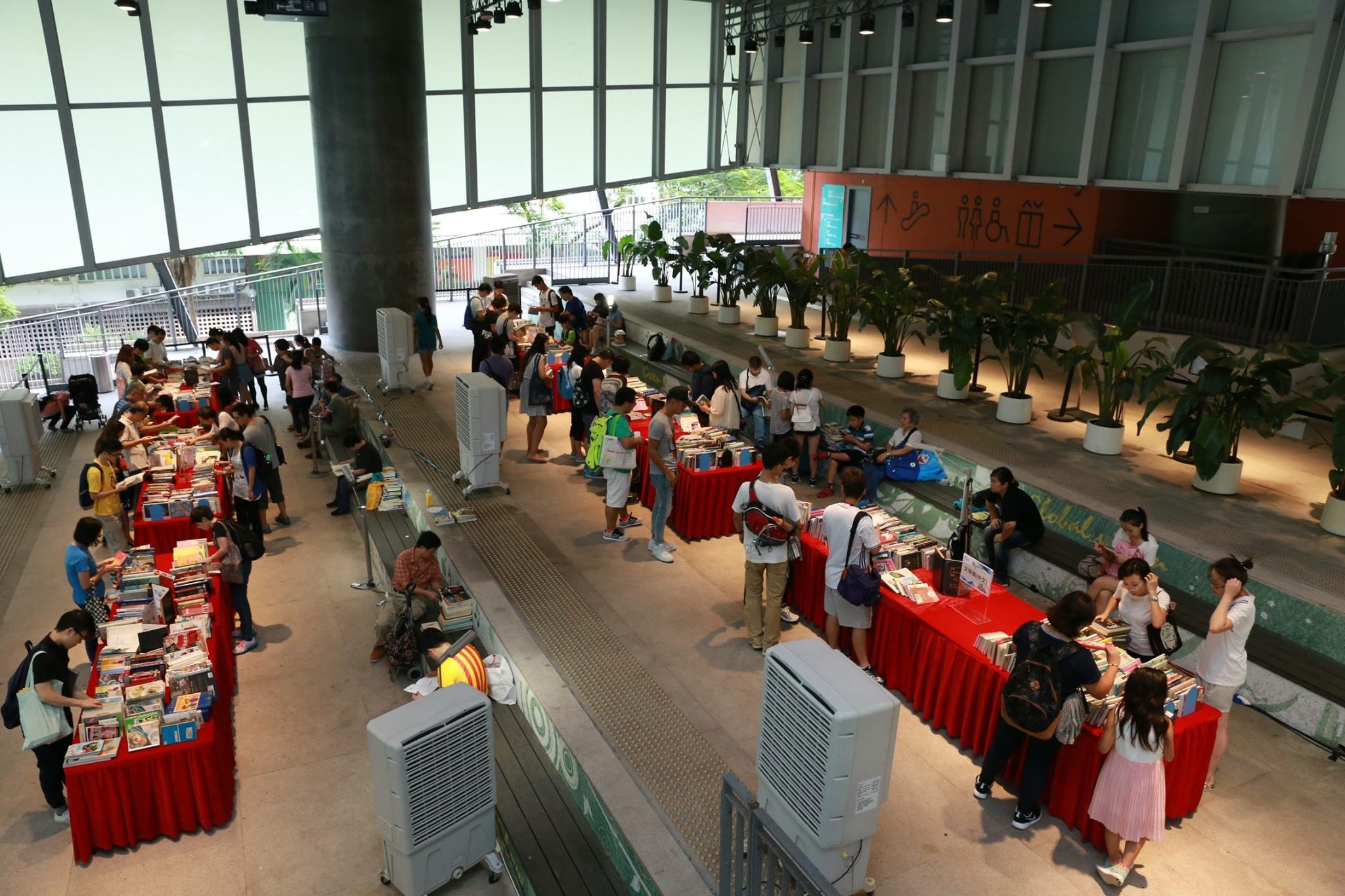
Book Crossing 2017 (July 2017).

== Y Loft ==
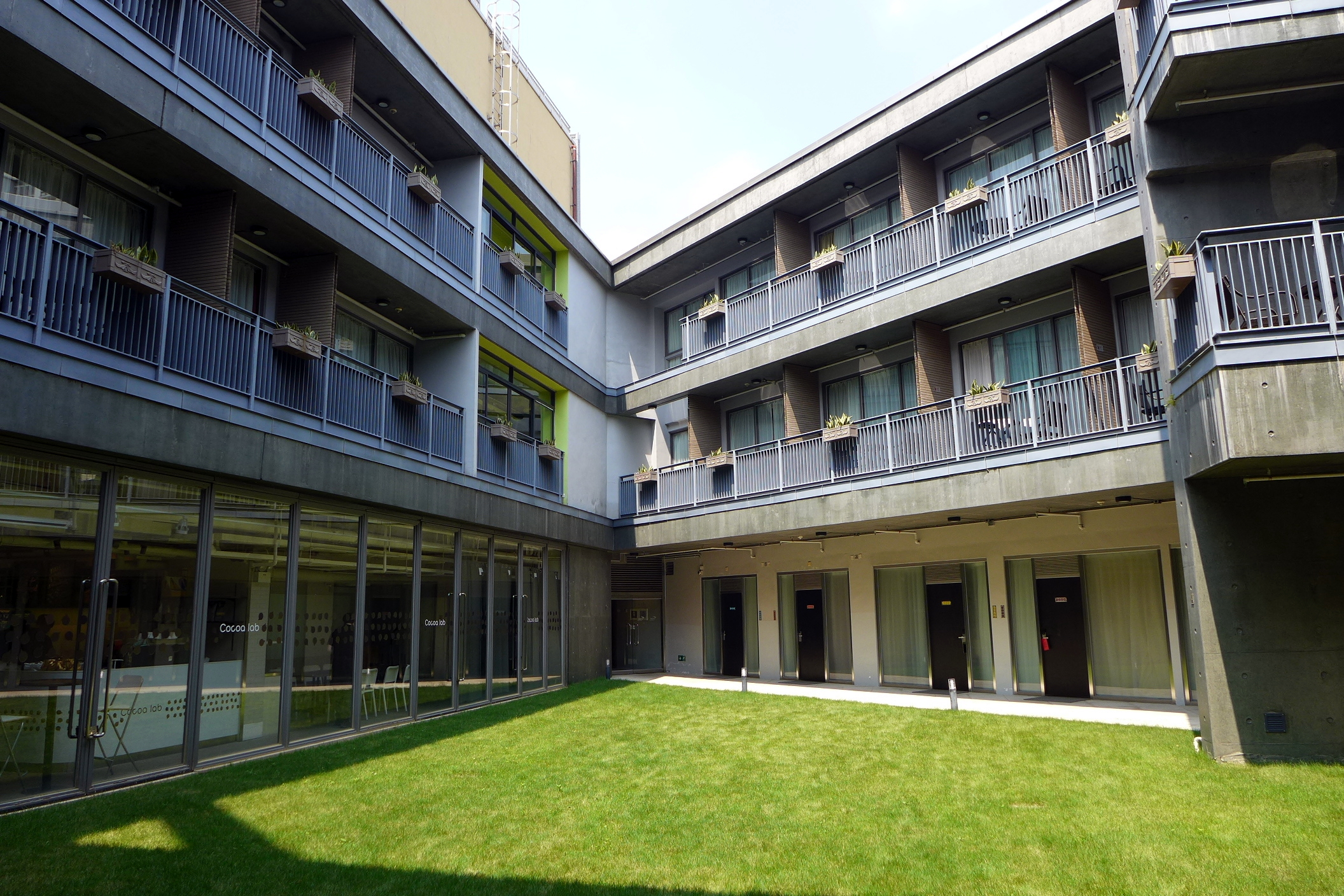
Hostel Block Courtyard (September 2016)

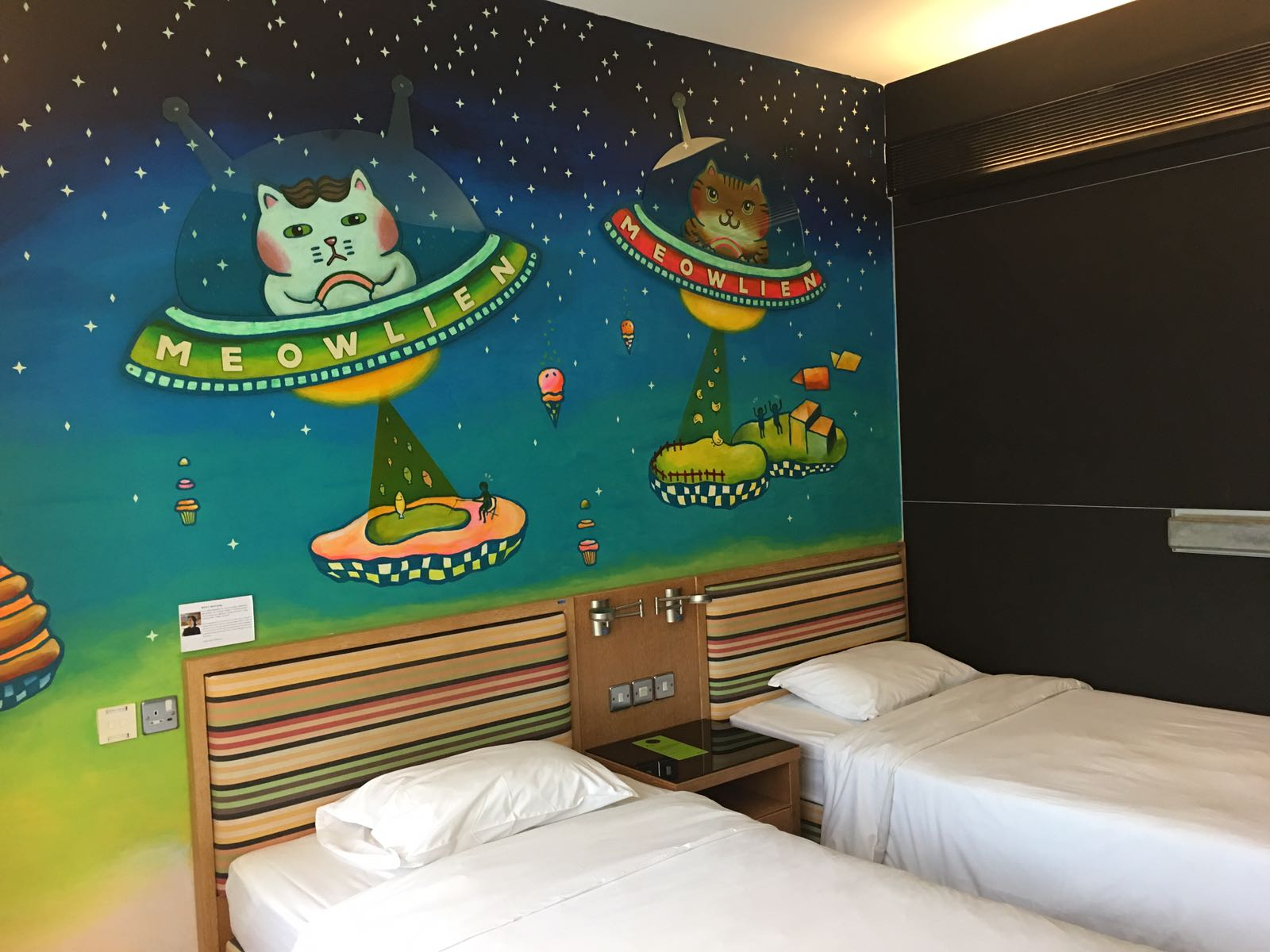
Y Loft Artisan Room (July 2017)

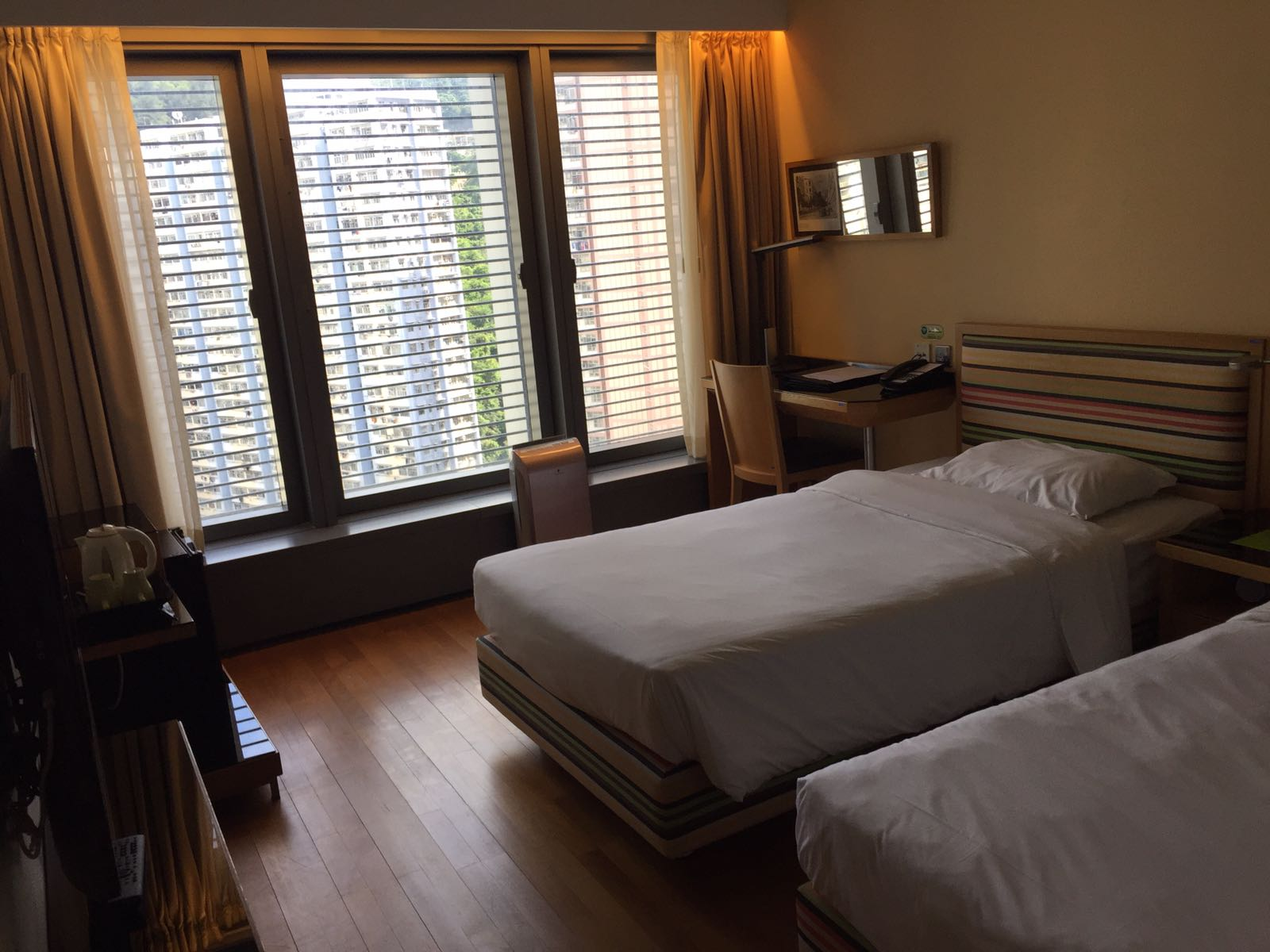
Y Loft Twin Room (July 2017)

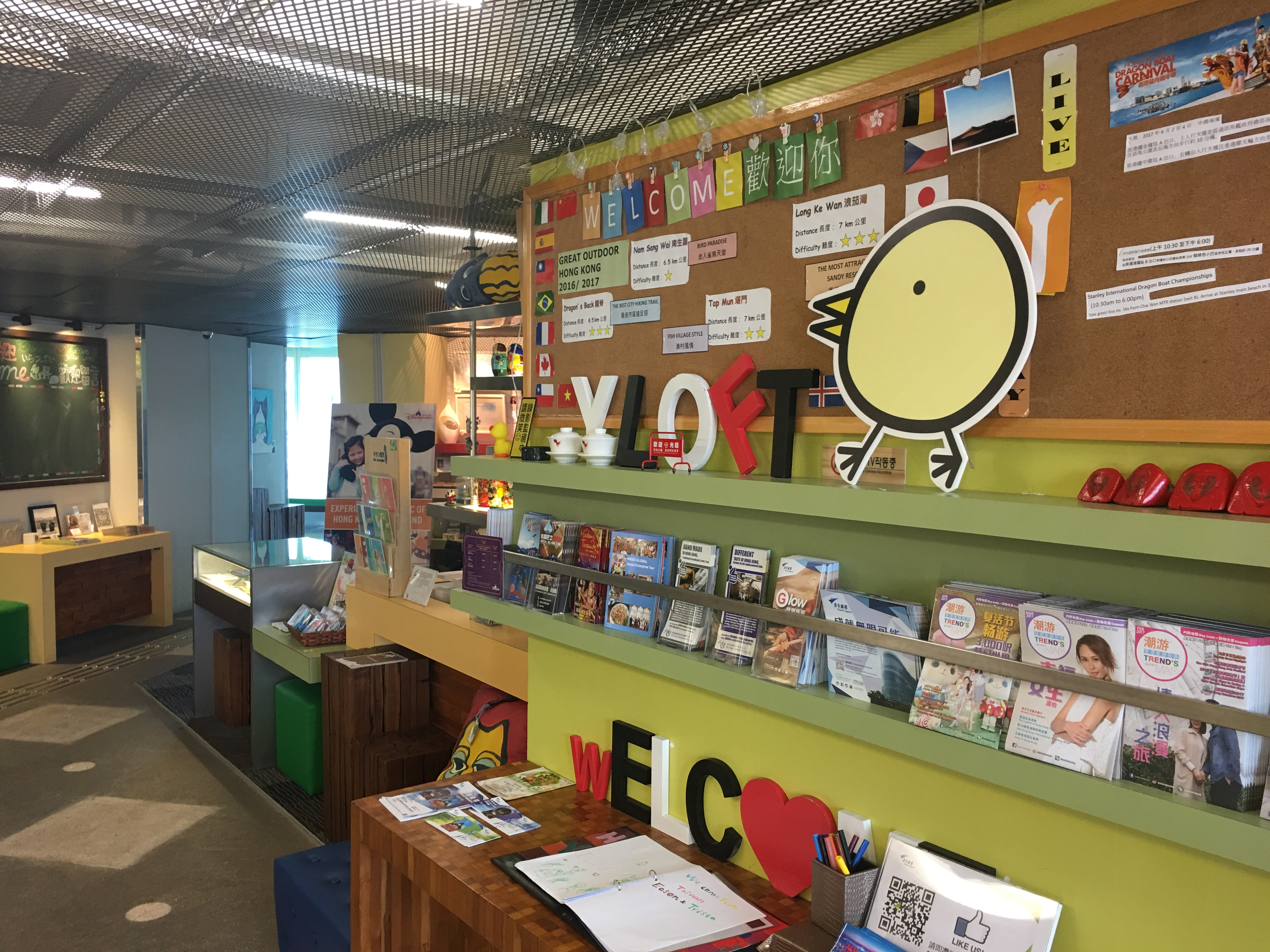
Y Loft Kiosk (May 2017)

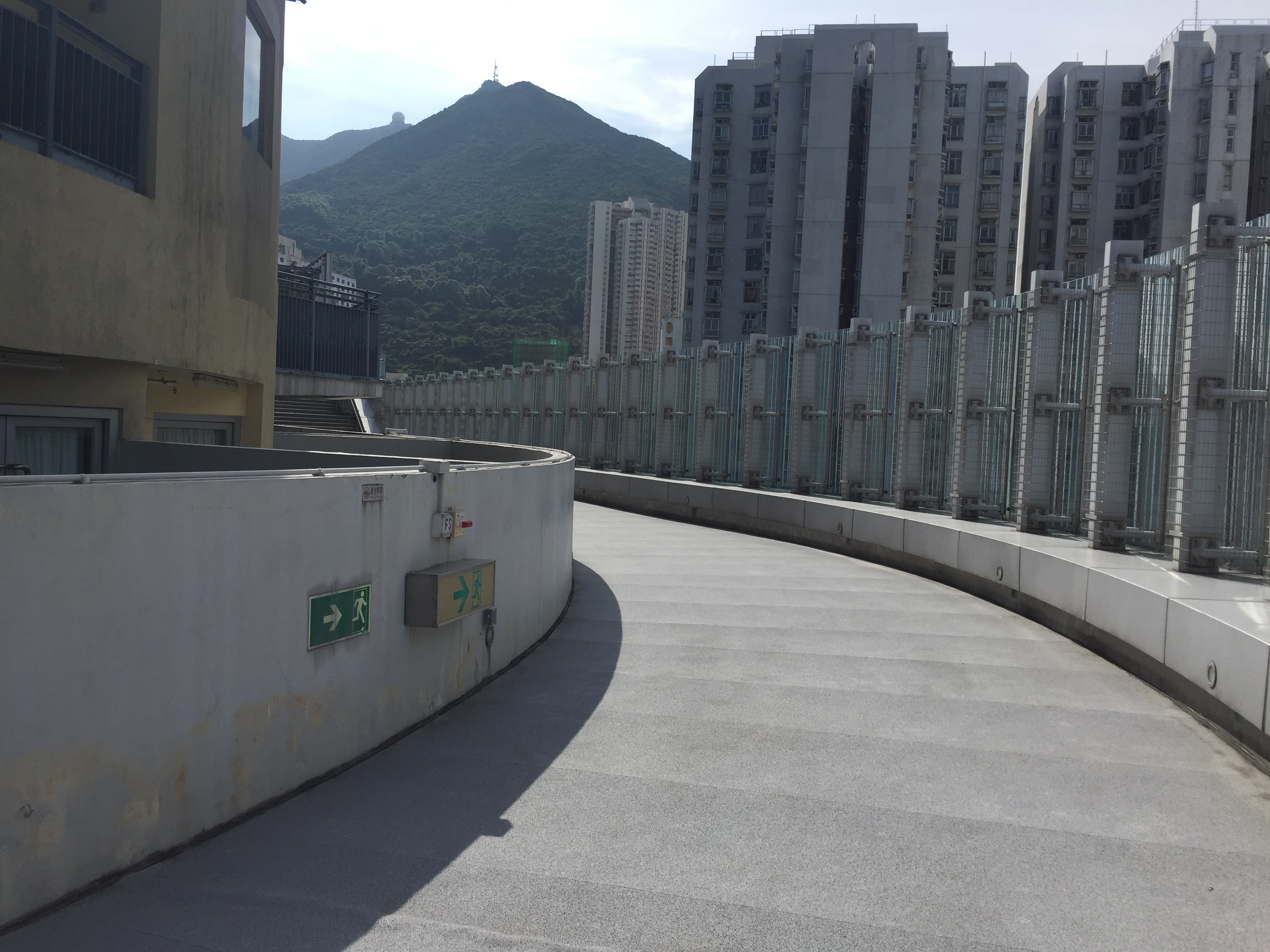
180-metre Sky Jogging Track (May 2017)

Y Loft is located in Youth Square's Main Block and Hostel Block, which directly connected to MTR Chai Wan station (Exit A) via a footbridge.

It also offers concession rate to youth organization or youth activities held by non-profit organization or International Student Identity Card (ISIC) and International Youth Travel Card (IYTC) members.
