= Chai Wan Road =

Road on Hong Kong Island

Coordinates: 22.2701°N 114.2374°E

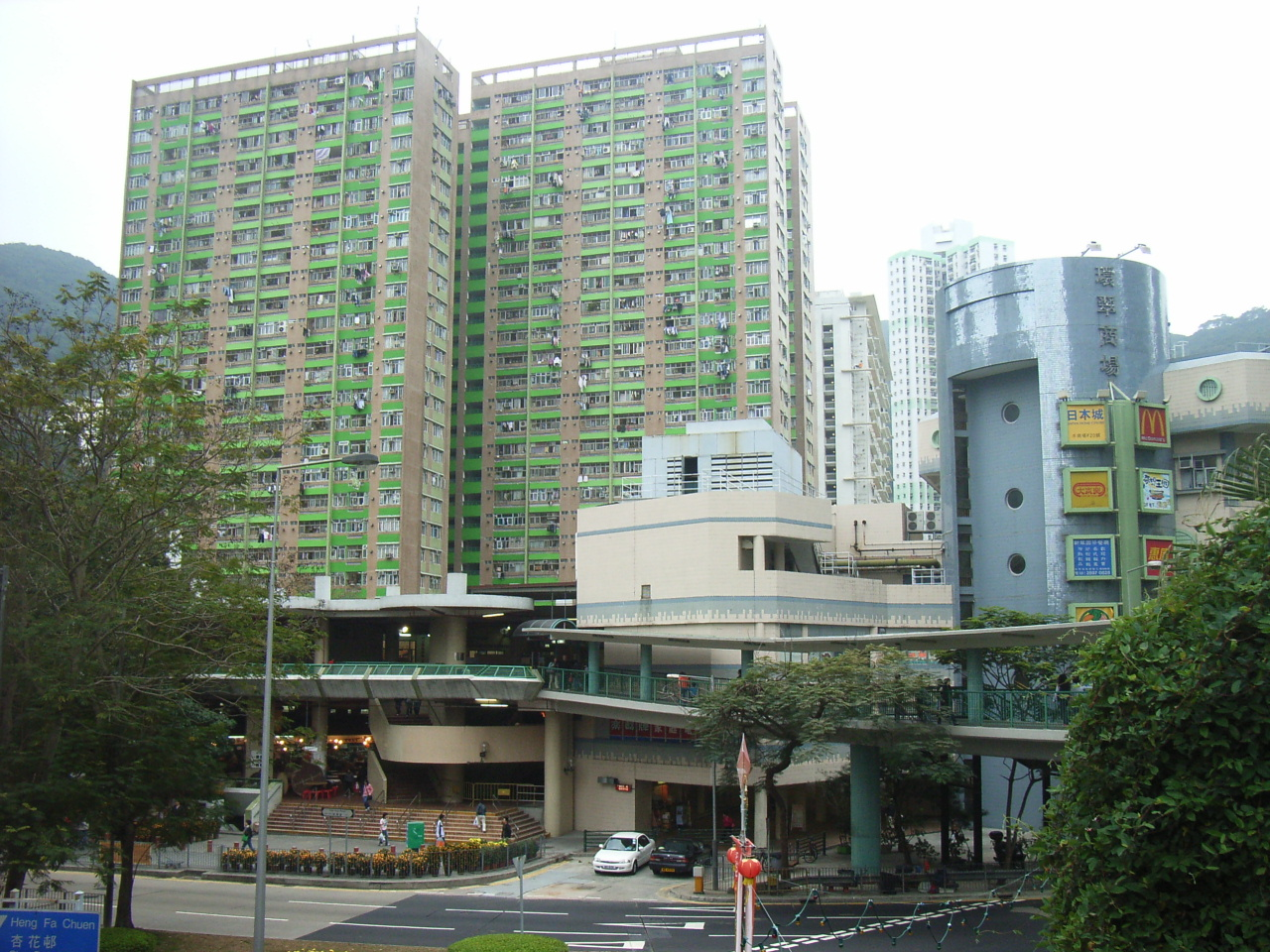
Chai Wan Road near Wan Tsui Estate

Chai Wan Road (Chinese: 柴灣道; Cantonese Yale: chaai4 waan1 dou6) located in Hong Kong, is one of the major roads in Chai Wan on Hong Kong Island. It runs from Shau Kei Wan to Chai Wan through Chai Wan Gap; with one of the steepest inclines in Hong Kong on either side, with signs posted 1 in 10 gradient. It is therefore popularly referred to as Cheung Meng Che (長命斜), or long-lived incline.

The road was the only way towards Chai Wan before the opening of the Island Eastern Corridor and MTR Island line. Currently, it is still the only pedestrian route connecting to Chai Wan.

== Route ==
From West to East:
Chai Wan Road starts from the connection with Shau Kei Wan Road and the off-ramp from the Island Eastern Corridor and then goes uphill through Chai Wan Gap. After junctioning with Tai Tam Road, it goes downhill into central Chai Wan, and intersects the Island Eastern Corridor's eastern terminus and Wan Tsui Road at a roundabout, before turning north-east and turning sharply to the east at the junction with Wing Tai Road and flows into Siu Sai Wan Road to the east at Sun Yip Street.

== Accidents ==
On 19 November 2012, three men were killed and 56 people were injured when a New World First Bus's driver became unconscious and hit a Kowloon Motor Bus and a taxi. British citizen Ivan Aranto Herrera Jorge and Swede Carl Magnus Lindgren, members of celebrity chef Heston Blumenthal's culinary team, were among the dead.

On 16 September 2017, a Citybus on route 118 was travelling along Chai Wan Road when one of its passengers was stabbed on the upper deck near Fu Shing Court. The suspect subsequently smashed open the window and jumped out in an attempted suicide. While no one else was injured, the victim succumbed to her injuries after being transported to Eastern Hospital. The suspect was eventually convicted of murder in December 2020 and sentenced to life imprisonment in 2021.

On 20 January 2018, a truck whose crane was raised while driving on Chai Wan Road crashed into a bridge. No one was injured and the driver was stuck in the vehicle for an hour and half until being rescued.

== Major buildings ==
From West to East:

- Salesian English School
- Island Garden
- Shau Kei Wan Fire Station
- Shau Kei Wan East Government Secondary School
- Shau Kei Wan Government Secondary School
- Shan Tsui Court
- Hing Man Estate
- Koway Court
- Hing Wah Estate
- Law Uk Folk Museum
- Youth Square
- New Jade Gardens
- Chai Wan station
- Wan Tsui Estate
- Chai Wan Municipal Services Building
- Lok Hin Terrace
- Yue Wan Estate
- Sheng Kung Hui Chai Wan St. Michael's Primary School
- Mega iAdvantage (互聯優勢大廈) (One of the major Internet housing locations of Asia)

== See also ==
- List of streets and roads in Hong Kong
