= Siu Sai Wan =

Residential area in Hong Kong

Coordinates: 22.2617°N 114.2492°E

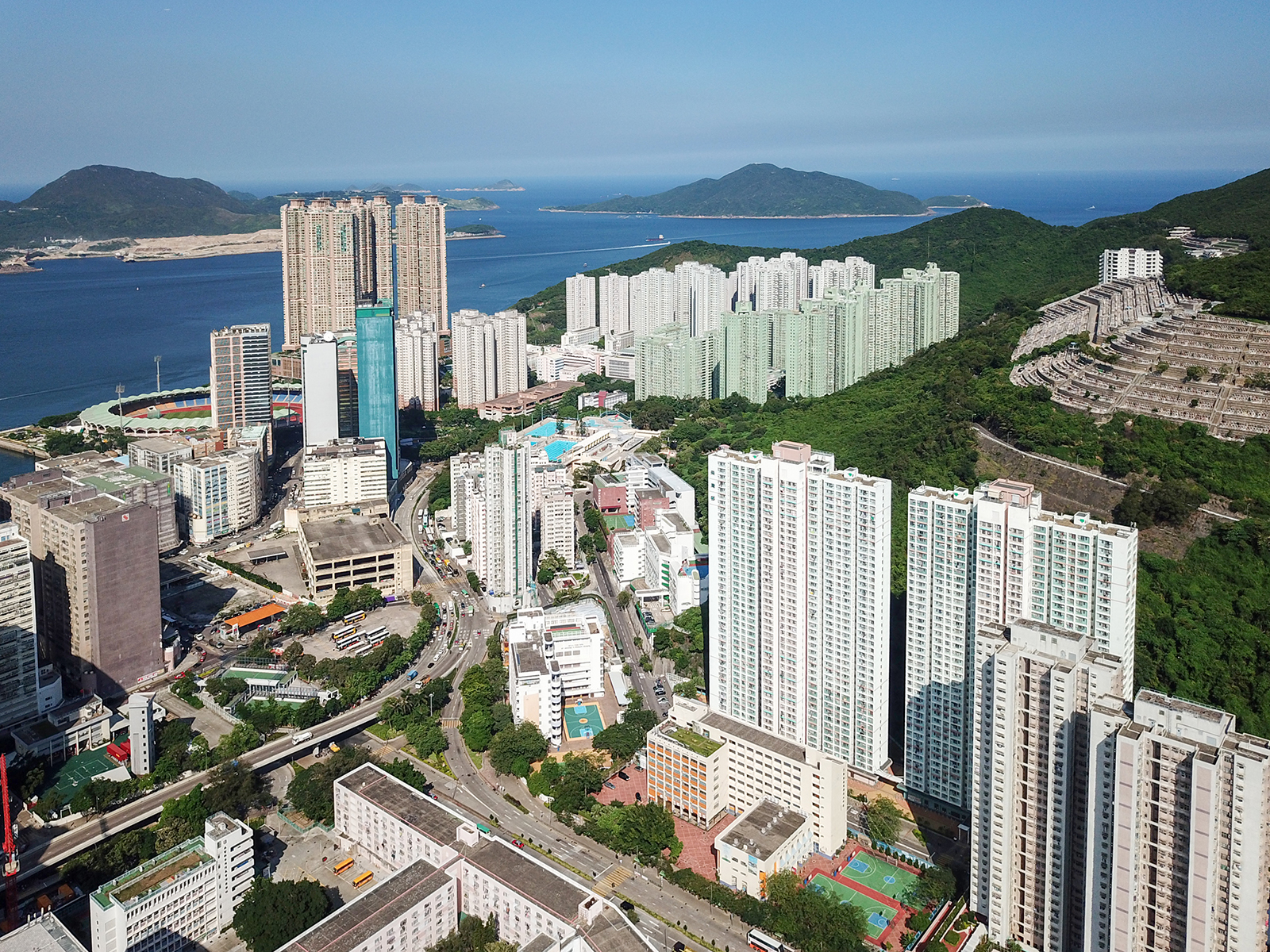
- Aerial View of Siu Sai Wan
- Traditional Chinese: 小西灣
- Simplified Chinese: 小西湾
- Cantonese Yale: Síusāiwāan
- Literal meaning: "small west bay"
Transcriptions
Standard Mandarin
- Hanyu Pinyin: Xiǎoxīwān
Yue: Cantonese
- Yale Romanization: Síusāiwāan
- Jyutping: Siu2sai1waan1

Location of Siu Sai Wan within HKSAR

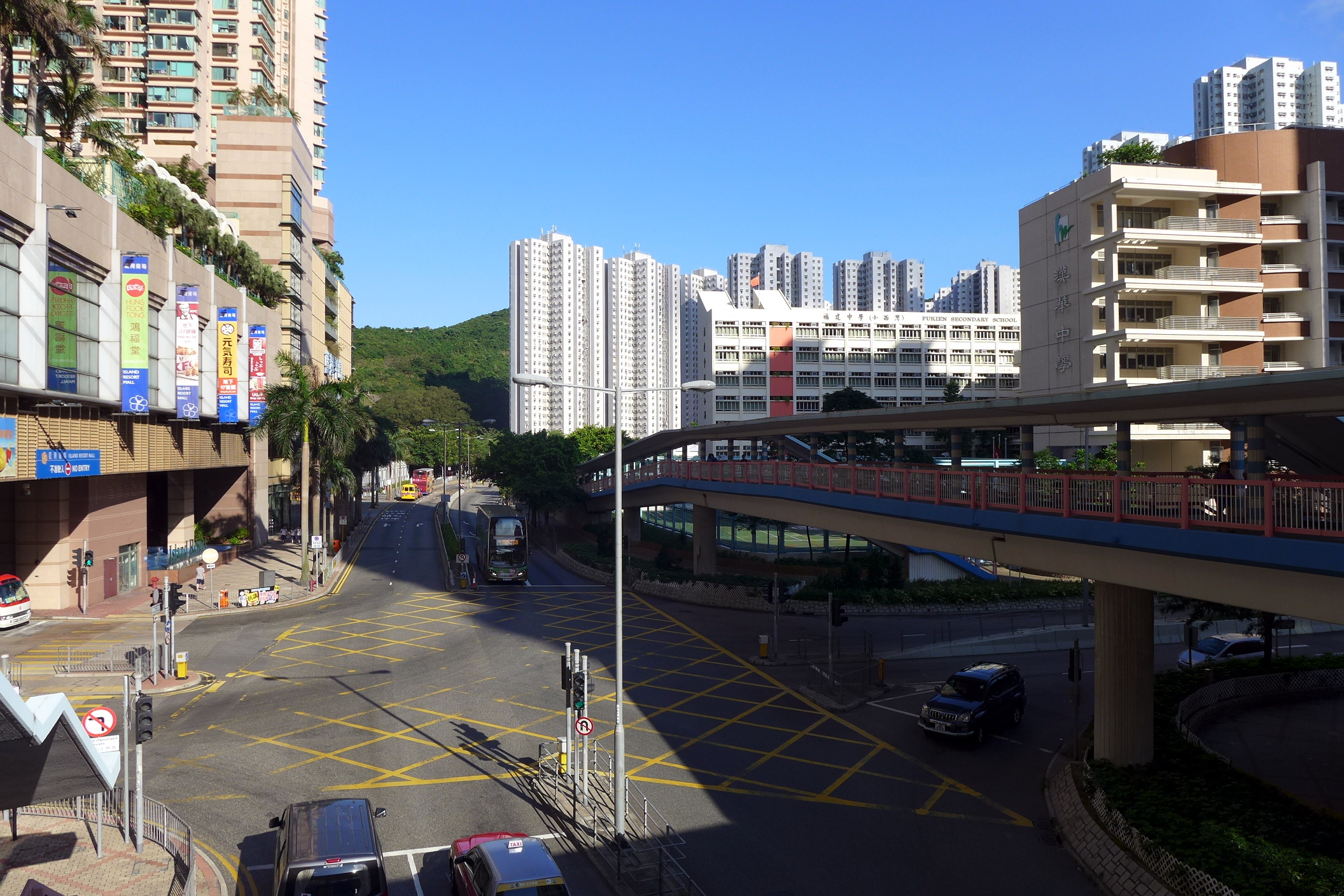
Buildings in Siu Sai Wan

Siu Sai Wan (Chinese: 小西灣) is a residential area in the northeastern part of Hong Kong Island in Hong Kong. It is located in the eastern part of Chai Wan, and is administratively under the Eastern District. The population was 59,729 in June 2011.

== Location ==
The current perimeter of Siu Sai Wan includes the rest of Chai Wan east of Wing Tai Road. Prior to reclamation, Siu Sai Wan was a small bay east of Chai Wan. Chai Wan was once known as Sai Wan (Chinese: 西灣; Cantonese Yale: Sāiwāan; West Bay), and the small bay as Siu Chai Wan (Chinese: 小柴灣; Cantonese Yale: Síu Chàaihwāan; Small Chai Wan) or Chai Wan Tsai (Chinese: 柴灣仔; Cantonese Yale: Chàaihwāan Jái; Little Chai Wan), and over time the names combined into the current name Siu Sai Wan.

== History ==
Siu Sai Wan was originally an intelligence gathering centre for the United Kingdom. In 1947, Australia, Canada, New Zealand, United Kingdom and United States signed an agreement to jointly pursue the gathering of intelligence. The British Armed Forces then set up an intelligence gathering centre in Siu Sai Wan, one of the largest in the Far East, to monitor wireless communications from Taiwan (ROC) to China (PRC). In 1985, shortly after the handover of Hong Kong to China was agreed, the centre was dismantled.

At the same time, along with the development of the Mass Transit Railway, the resettlement estates in Chai Wan were to be demolished. To accommodate residents from these estates and from the expanding urban population, the government decided to develop Siu Sai Wan. At that time the name Siu Sai Wan was deemed "indecent" by the Government, who suggested to name the area "Siu Chai Wan" instead. This didn't sit well with local residents, and as a result when the Siu Sai Wan Estate was built a few years later, the name Siu Sai Wan was returned to the area. Nevertheless, taxi drivers are known to use a similar-sounding profane term when they refer to the area.

Siu Sai Wan faces Tathong Channel and Lei Yue Mun, an entrance to the Victoria Harbour. The government has built Home Ownership Scheme housing such as Harmony Garden.

== Housing ==
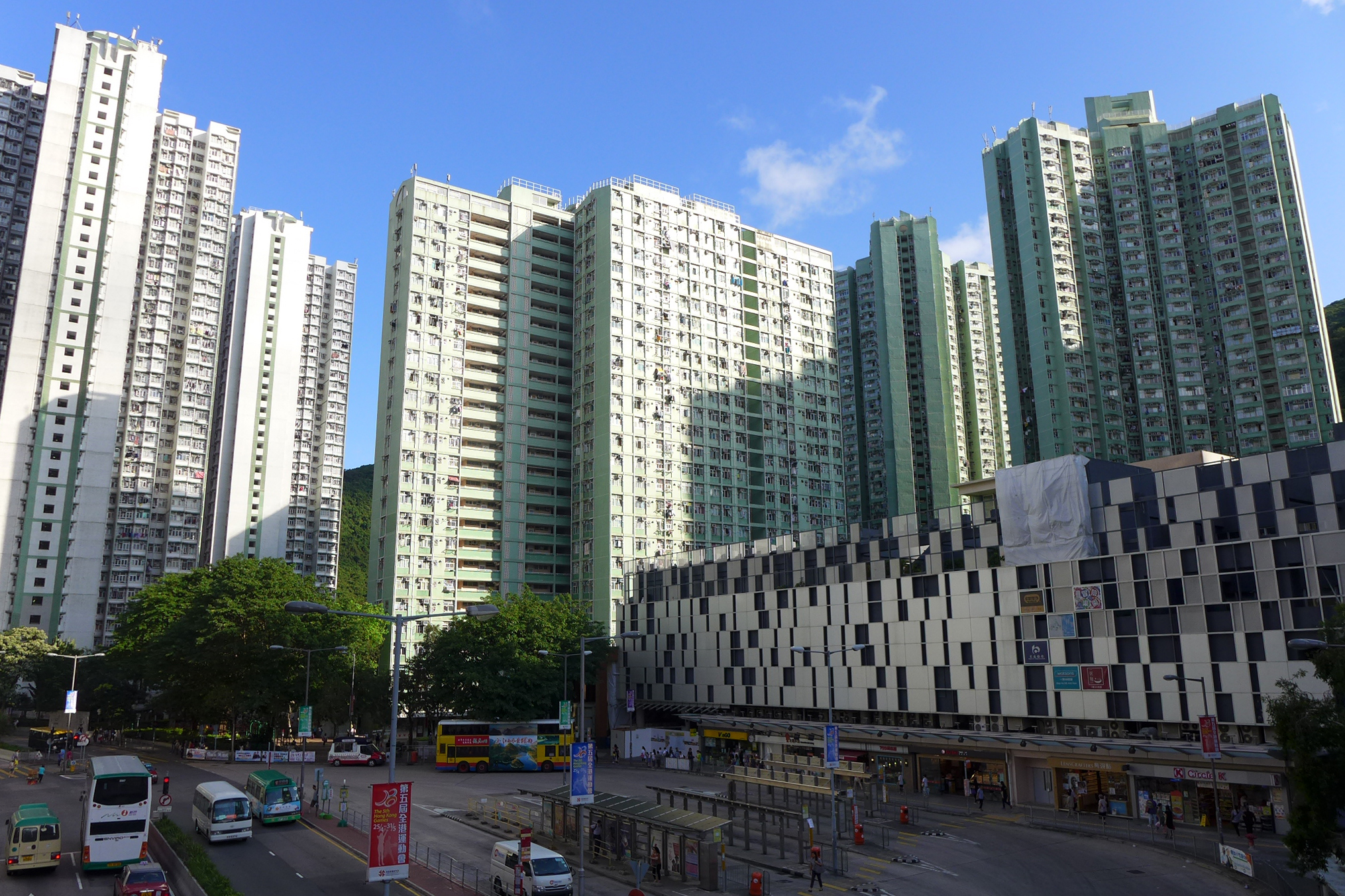
Siu Sai Wan Estate

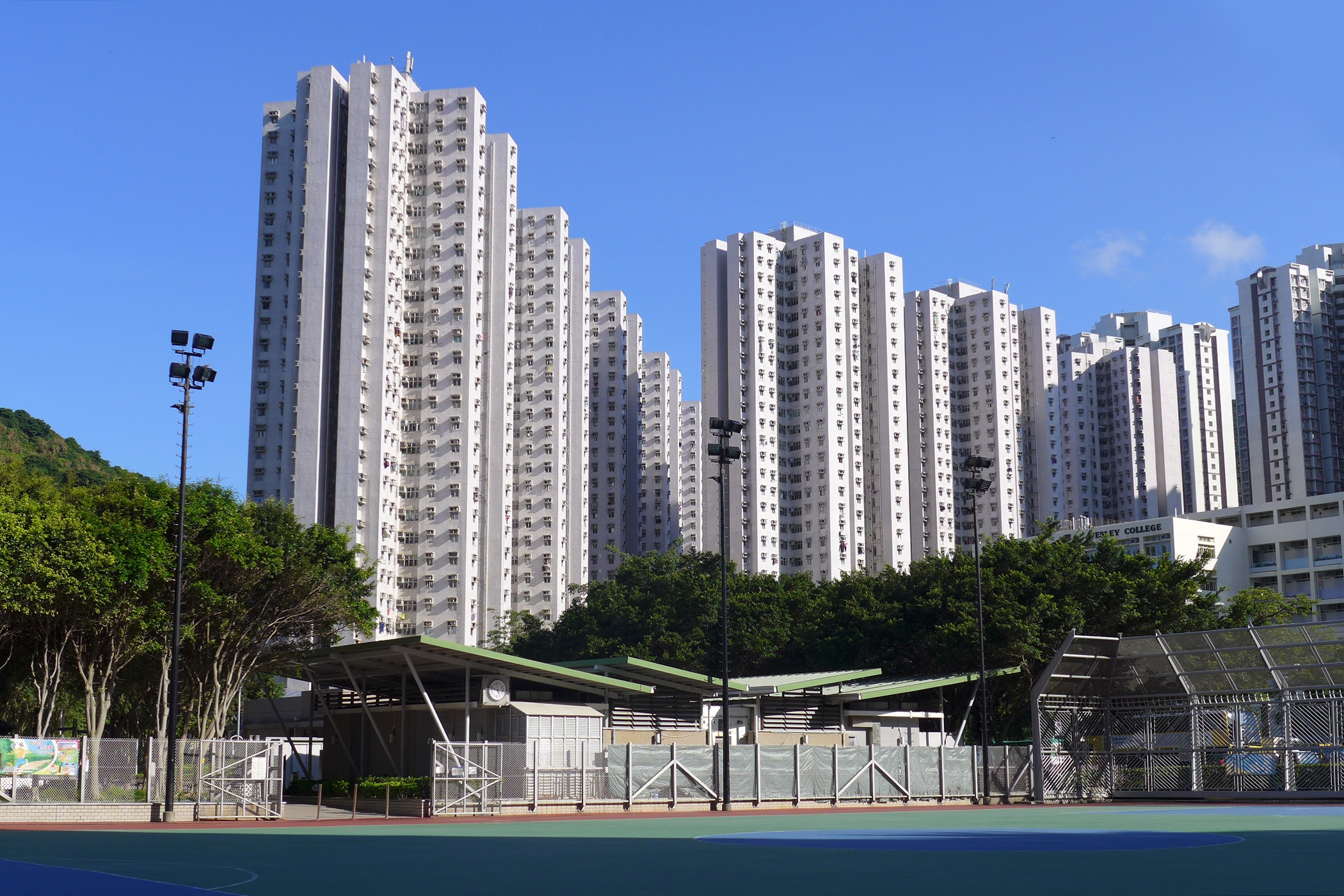
Fullview Garden

- Private housing estates include:
  - Island Resort
- Public housing estates in Siu Sai Wan
  - Siu Sai Wan Estate

== Education ==
A number of schools including both primary and secondary schools can be found in Siu Sai Wan.

- Secondary schools:
  - Fukien Secondary School (Siu Sai Wan)
  - Hon Wah College
  - Lingnan Hang Yee Memorial Secondary School
  - The Chinese Foundation Secondary School (CFSS)
  - The Methodist Church Hong Kong Wesley College
- Primary schools:
  - Pui Kiu Primary School
  - Tung Wah Group of Hospitals Lee Chi Hung Memorial Primary School (Chai Wan) (Closed down on 31 August 2011)
- Kindergartens:
  - Cannan Kindergarten (Siu Sai Wan)
  - Gar Lam Anglo-Chinese Kindergarten (Siu Sai Wan)

Siu Sai Wan is in Primary One Admission (POA) School Net 16. Within the school net are multiple aided schools (operated independently but funded with government money) and two government schools: Shau Kei Wan Government Primary School and Aldrich Bay Government Primary School.

Hong Kong Public Libraries operates the Siu Sai Wan Public Library in the Siu Sai Wan Complex.

== Social amenities ==
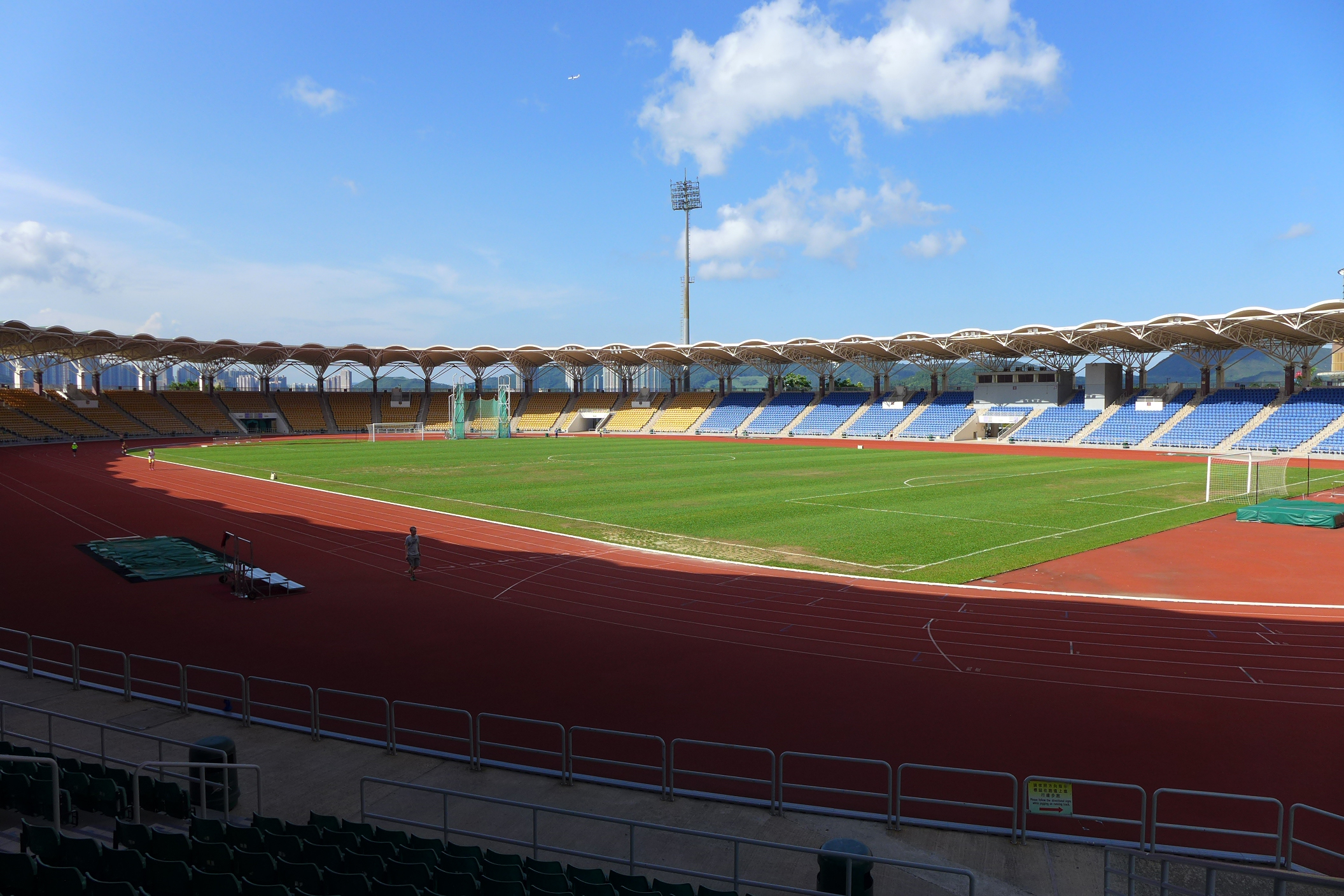
Siu Sai Wan Sports Ground

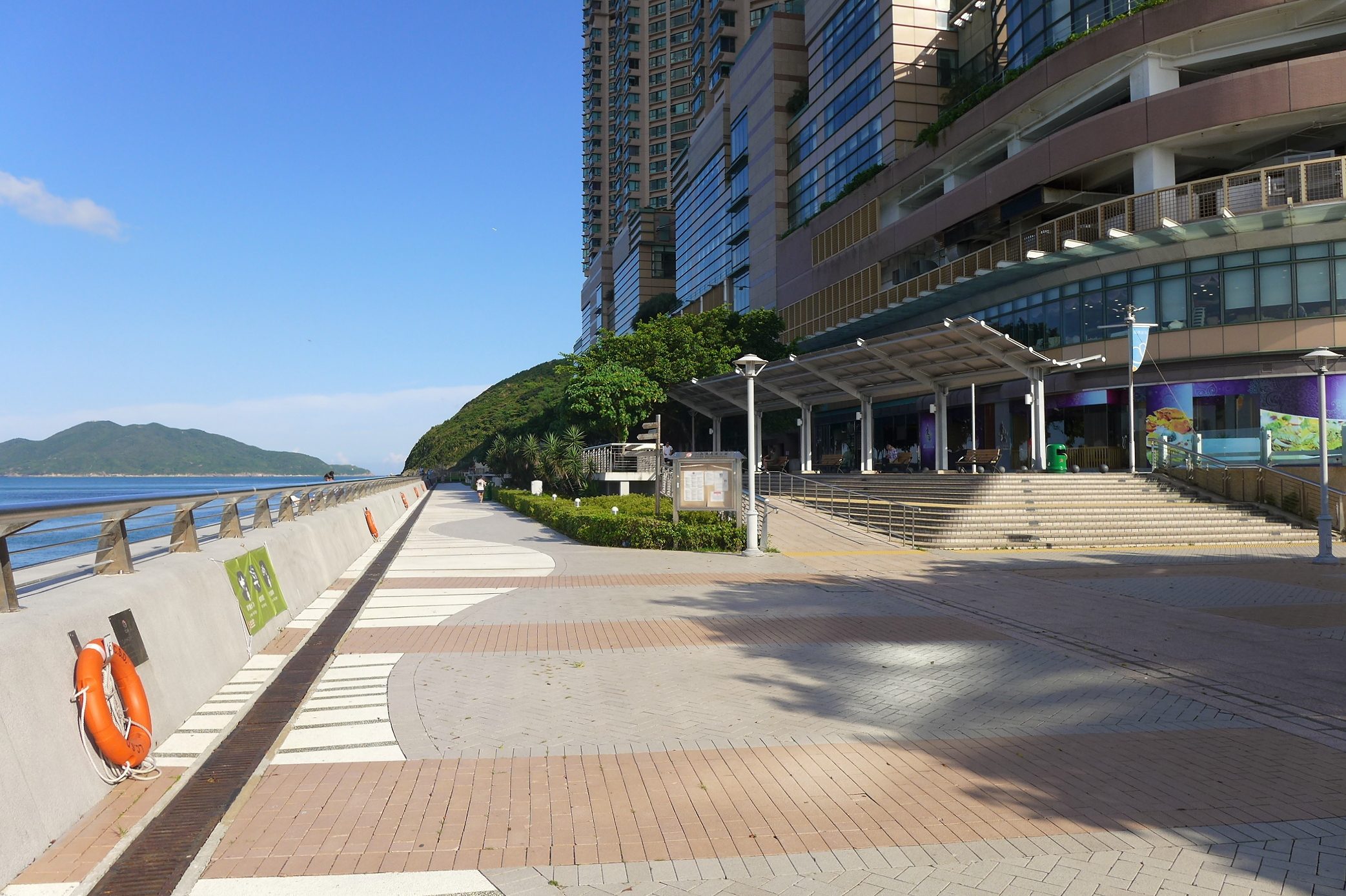
Siu Sai Wan Promenade

- Siu Sai Wan Sports Ground
- Siu Sai Wan Promenade
- Siu Sai Wan Complex

== Transport ==
With the Island Resort now constructed, the population of Siu Sai Wan has been steadily increasing, so both First Bus and Citybus extended routes ending at Chai Wan (East) to Siu Sai Wan Estate and Island Resort.

The government suggested to the MTR Corporation (MTR) in 2001 that they should consider extending the Island line to Siu Sai Wan from Chai Wan. In June 2005, the MTR revealed that they had started planning for the extension. In 2014, the MTR withdrawn the plan of extension, due to the difficulties of extension.

=== Main roads ===
- Siu Sai Wan Road
- Harmony Road

=== Public transportation ===
There is currently no direct MTR service to Siu Sai Wan. However, residents can walk or take Green Public Light Buses route 47M to reach Chai Wan station, the terminus of the Island line.

- Buses
  - Citybus: 8H, 8P, 8S, 8X, 49X, 82, 82S, 82X, 85, 85P, 88X, 314, 788, 789, A12, N8P, N8X, NA12
  - Cross-harbour routes: 106, 106P, 118, 118P, 606, 606X, 608P, 682, 694, 976A, N118
- Minibuses
  - Green Public Light Buses
    - 44M, 47E, 47M, 47S, 61, 62, 62A
