= Island Resort (Hong Kong) =

Private housing estate in Hong Kong

Coordinates: 22.2667°N 114.2499°E

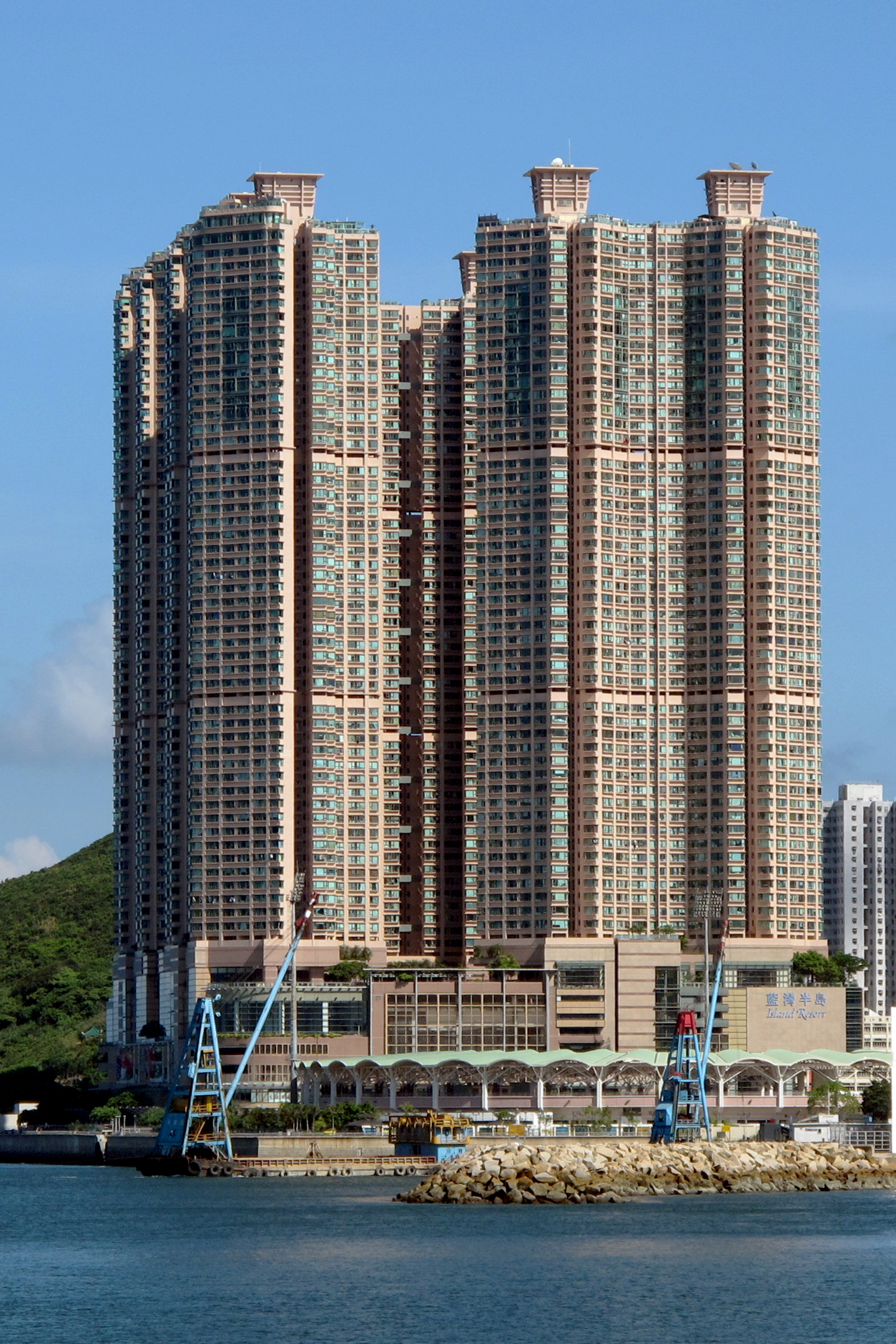
- Island Resort viewed from Yau Tong.
- Traditional Chinese: 藍灣半島
- Simplified Chinese: 蓝湾半岛
Transcriptions
Standard Mandarin
- Hanyu Pinyin: Lánwān Bàndǎo
Yue: Cantonese
- Jyutping: laam4 waan1 bun3 dou2

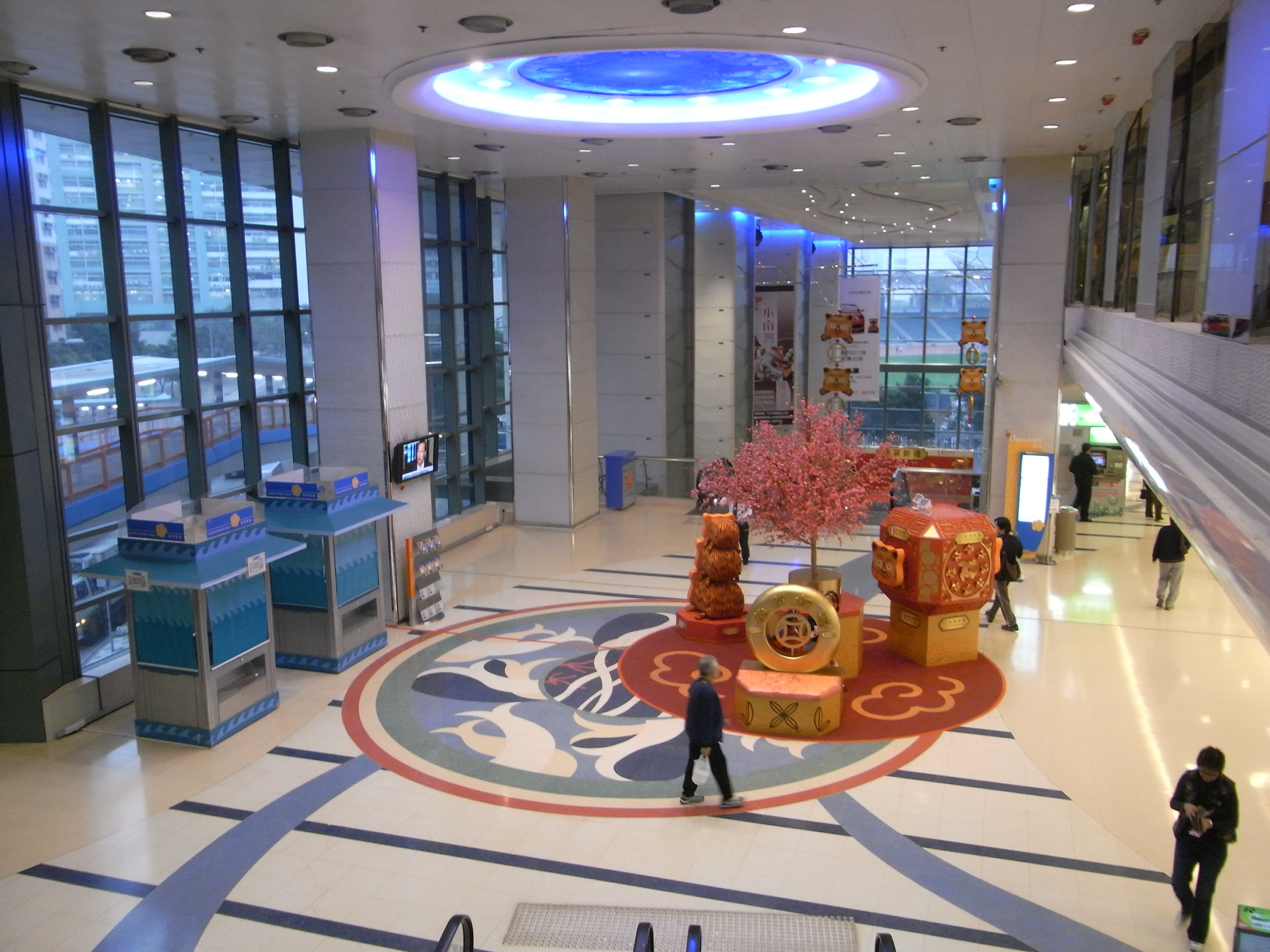
Island Resort Mall

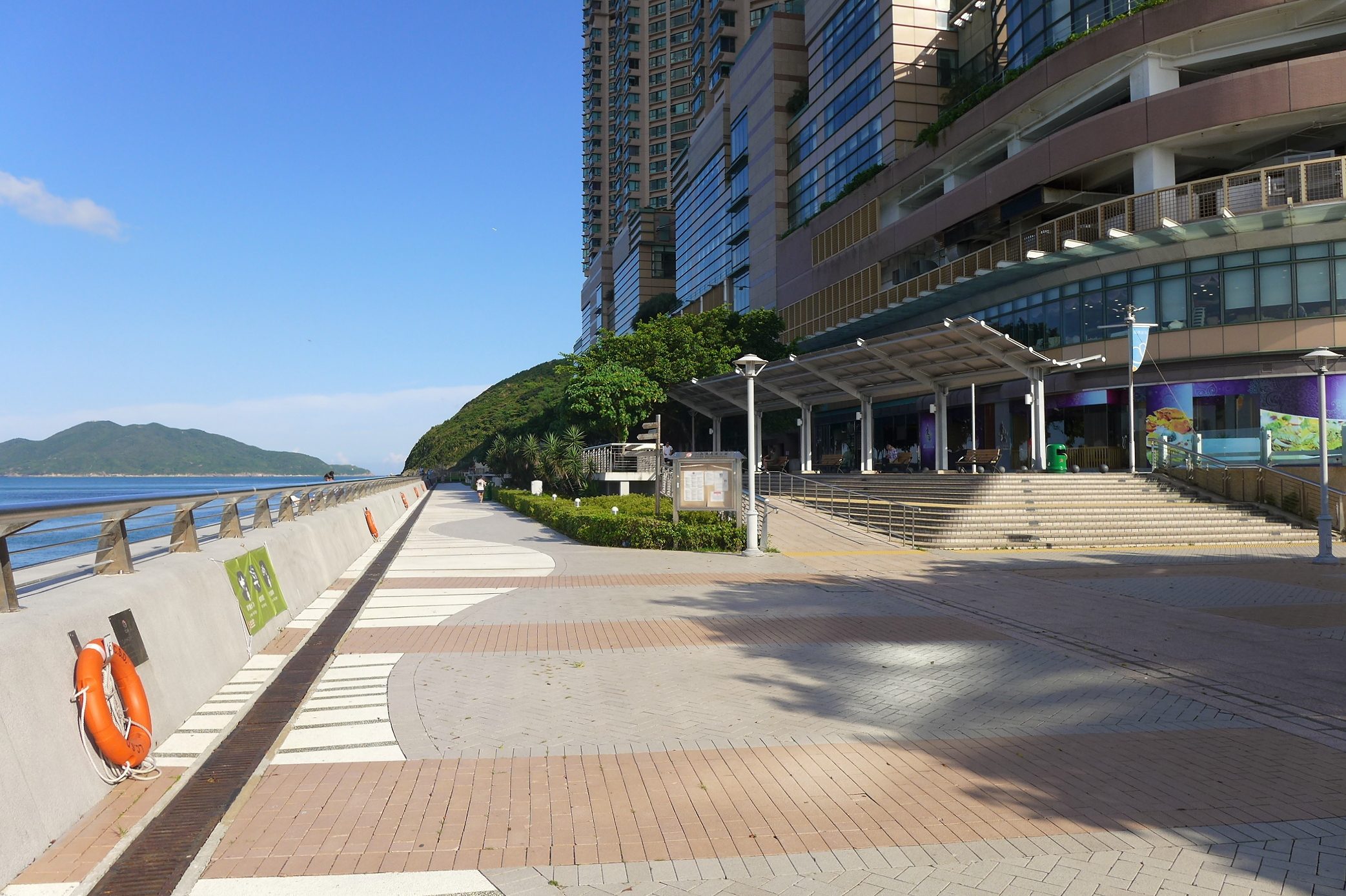
Siu Sai Wan Promenade along Island Resort and Island Resort Mall

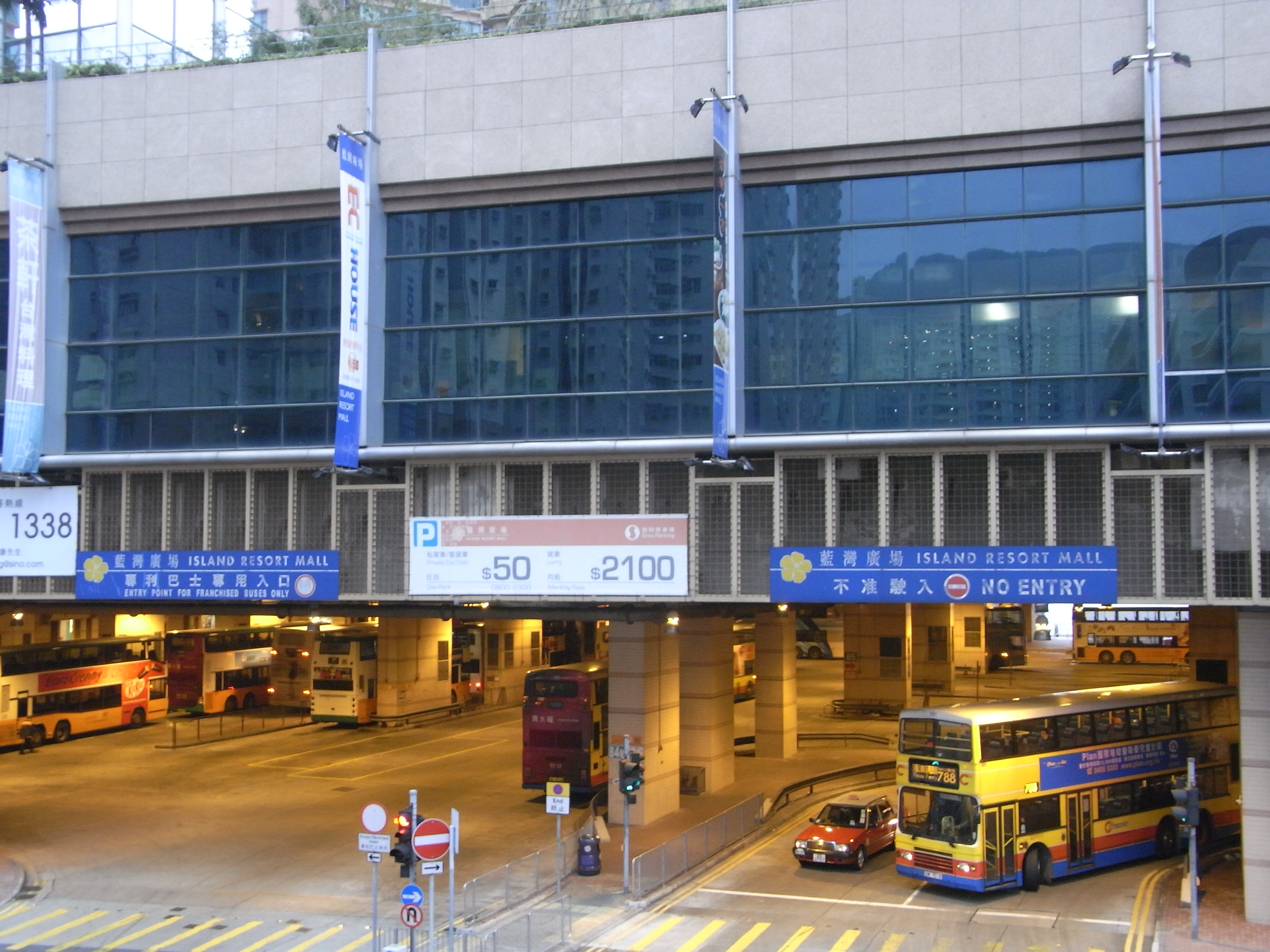
Siu Sai Wan (Island Resort) Public Transport Interchange

Island Resort (Chinese: 藍灣半島) is a high-rise complex located in the Siu Sai Wan area of Hong Kong (address: 28 Siu Sai Wan Road, Siu Sai Wan, Chai Wan, Hong Kong). Construction of the complex began in 1999, and was completed in 2001. It is also the 71st tallest building in Hong Kong, tied with The Dynasty Tower.

The land on which the Island Resort complex is situated is the most expensive in the city; in 1997, prior to the transfer of sovereignty of Hong Kong, Sino Land purchased the 2,500,000-square-metre (27,000,000 sq ft) piece of land for US$1,515,384,620 in order to develop the Island Resort complex. The purchase was the last major land sale in Hong Kong that took place while the United Kingdom was still in control, and was also the most expensive land transaction in the city's history.

== Features ==
The complex contains four towers, each of which rises 60 floors and 202 metres (663 ft) in height; although the property is classified as containing nine towers, real estate data company Emporis lists the complex as only four skyscrapers, as several are interconnected. The buildings are composed almost entirely of residential units, with a total of 3,098 apartments; the lowermost floors are used as retail and restaurant space. There is a swimming pool complex, with outdoor and indoor pools. The outdoor pools are in the middle of the tower area and the indoor one is within the main complex.

The complex also includes a three-floor shopping mall, a six-floor car park* and a three-floor club house. Facilities provided by the clubhouse include a library, gym room, BBQ area, band room, tennis courts, basketball court, 4 bowling ball lanes, badminton courts, music rooms, play room, snooker room, an indoor and outdoor swimming pool, a bar, a lounge, meeting rooms, study room, and a squash court.

The residential buildings do not include floor 13, 14, 24, 34, 44 and 54 because it is believed that 4 is an unlucky number to Chinese people and also a representative of death.

== Transportation ==
Though there is no MTR station near Island Resort, there is a MTR station at the local market which is about 3 minutes away. There is a minibus connecting Island Resort and Heng Fa Chuen MTR station. Moreover, there is a bus terminus located on the ground floor of Island Resort. There are various bus routes going to and from Hong Kong Island, Kowloon and New Territories.

== Demographics ==
According to the 2016 by-census, Island Resort had a population of 9,319. The median age was 41 and the majority of residents (86 per cent) were of Chinese ethnicity. The average household size was 3.2 people. The median monthly household income of all households (i.e. including both economically active and inactive households) was HK$69,250.

== Politics ==
Island Resort is located in Yan Lam constituency of the Eastern District Council. It was formerly represented by Alice Ishigami Lee Fung-king, who was elected in the 2019 elections until July 2021.

== See also ==
- List of tallest buildings in Hong Kong
