= Salesian English School =

School in Hong Kong

- 慈幼英文學校
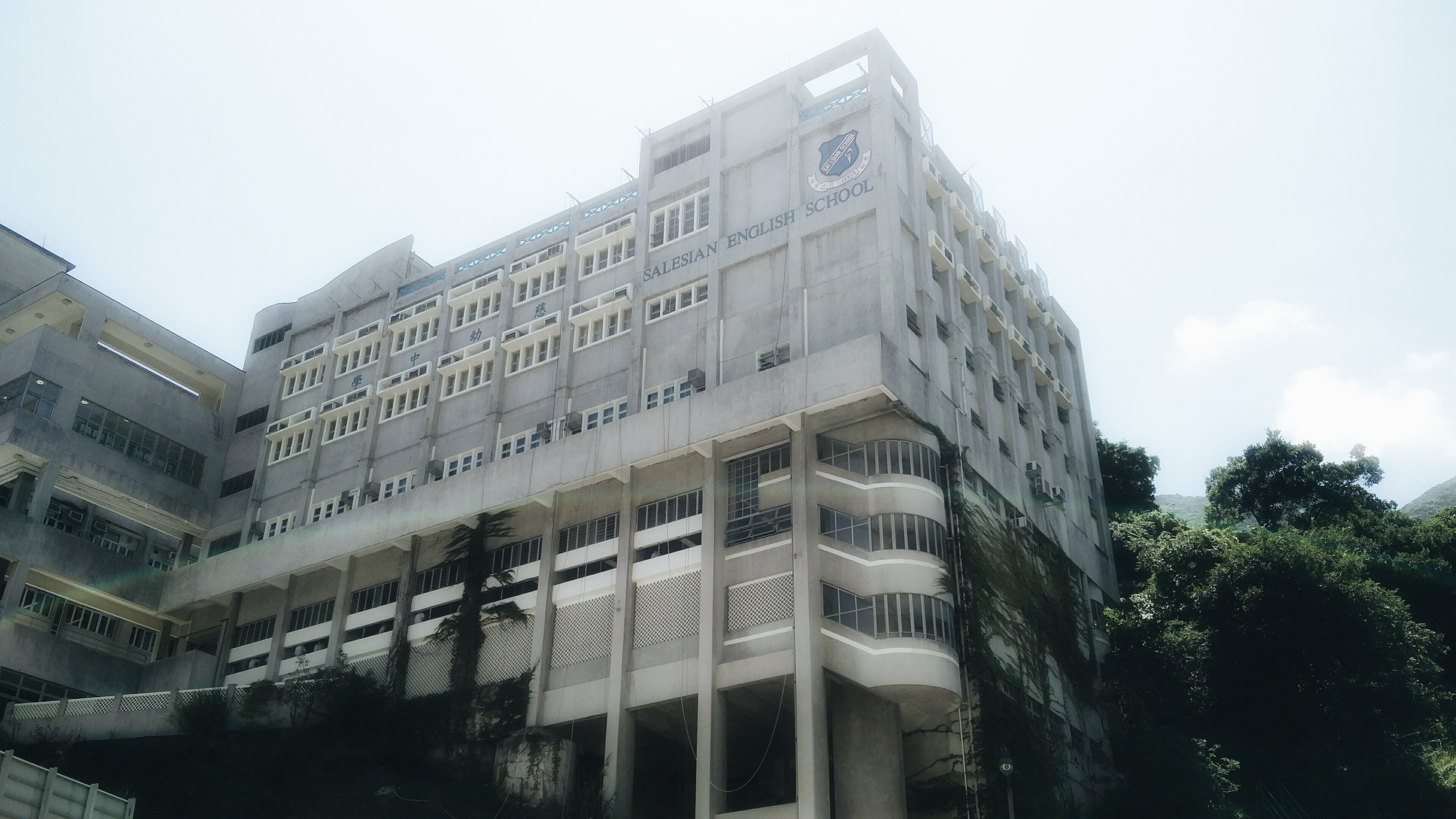
- New Wing of Salesian English School

Location
- 16 Chai Wan Road, Shau Kei Wan; Hong Kong

Information
- Type: Aided School
- Motto: ALERE FLAMMAM (To feed the flame)
- Religious affiliations: Roman Catholic; Salesians of Don Bosco
- Patron saint: Bl.Filippo Rinaldi
- Established: 1951; 75 years ago
- School district: Eastern District
- Principal: Mr. Tse Sui Fai
- Supervisor: Fr. Savio Yeung Cho Law SDB
- Years: Forms 1–6
- Gender: Boy
- Team name: Salesian Boys
- Website: www.ssshk.edu.hk

Salesian English School
- Traditional Chinese: 慈幼英文學校
- Simplified Chinese: 慈幼英文学校
Transcriptions
Standard Mandarin
- Hanyu Pinyin: Cí Yòu Yīngwén Xuéxiào
Yue: Cantonese
- Jyutping: ci4 jau3 jing1 man4 hok6 haau6

Salesian English School (Secondary Section), is a secondary boys school in Hong Kong. Founded by the Roman Catholic religious institute the Salesians of Don Bosco, it is located at Chai Wan Road, Shau Kei Wan, Hong Kong Island. The school's patron saint is Blessed Filippo Rinaldi and the motto is "Alere Flammam".

== History ==
Salesian English School has its roots in the Salesian Children's Home under the Salesian Seminary, which was founded by the Salesians of Don Bosco. In the aftermath of World War II, the number of students increased tremendously due to the high amount of dayboys and boarders attending the school. The school was operated by the Salesian China Province of Mary Help of Christians.

Salesian English School was established as an independent entity in 1951, with the secondary section also being created in the same year. In 1959, the first senior secondary students sat for the Hong Kong Certificate of Education Examination and received respectable results. The construction of the building of the secondary section was completed and started to operate in the same year; then Hong Kong Governor Sir Robert Brown Black was invited as a guest in its opening ceremony. The new indoor playground and new wing construction project were launched in 1966 and completed in 1972. Three years later in 1975, the school joined the scheme of subsidy school (DSS) and became a subsidized school, resulting in changes to its operation such as the positions of Rector and Prefect of studies being replaced by a supervisor and principal respectively.

In 1976, the school's gymnasium became a temporary shelter for residents affected by a fire in Aldrich Bay Village, Shau Kei Wan.

In the 1990s, the first female teacher was employed at the school, which had not happened since the opening year.

Entering the 21st century, the school has proposed reform schemes in improving teaching methods and campus environment. To help students adapt the technology-orientated era, the school was renovated and new equipment was imported to assist the new education system.

Due to the education reform in 2000, the school was classified as Chinese as Medium of Instruction (CMI) school which has gravely affected the future development of the school. In September 2010, the school swapped CMI for "fine-tuned" Medium of Instruction (MOI) framework, aligning with the Hong Kong Government's territory-wide policy launch for that academic year which provided relief to the school academics.

== Hing Yik Footbridge ==
The Hing Yik Footbridge is a common nickname for a frequently used pedestrian overpass in front of Salesian English School, connecting the school building to northern Chai Wan Road. The street had formerly been a notorious accident blackspot, with several deaths occurring in the area due to its narrow pathway; a footbridge to minimize accidents was first proposed by Fr. Hing Yik Chan, whom the bridge would later be nicknamed in honor of, in 1976 and was eventually constructed in 1978. Salesian English School alumnus and former Legislative Council member Andrew Cheng stated that the bridge was also built to support refugees coming to the school for shelter because of the fire in Aldrich Bay Village.

The bridge became an essential facility for travelling to the school due to it being the only way to access the school from northern Chai Wan Road. According to a school alumnus, a teacher working in the school for 33 years apparently stated that she has used the bridge over 40,000 times.

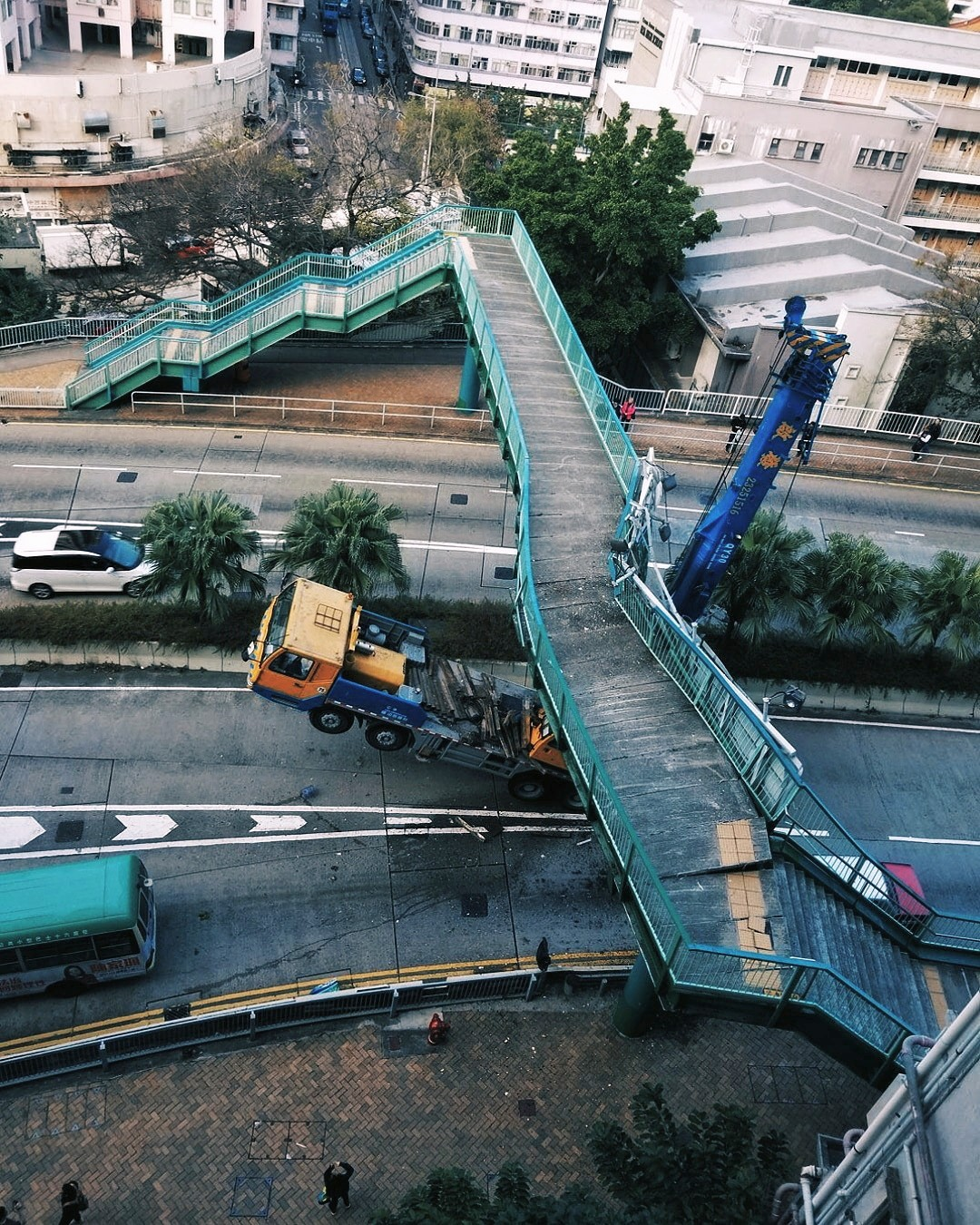
An aerial view of the 20 November accident.

On 20 November 2018, the Hing Yik Footbridge was damaged in a car accident; the overpass was hit by the crane of a truck, causing severe damage its structural integrity and forcing it to be dismantled.

Reconstruction of the Hing Yik Footbridge eventually began in August 2019 and was completed and reopened to the public in September 2019; the reopening took place during the 2019–2020 Hong Kong protests and as such was one of the many locations converted into a Lennon Wall, with notes and graffiti containing protest slogans such as "Liberate Hong Kong, revolution of our times" and mascot Pepe the Frog.

During the painting process for the new bridge in October 2019, another traffic accident occurred with the overpass; on 9 October, a double-decker New World First Bus crashed into a crane truck next to the bridge, causing several injuries.

== Notable alumni ==
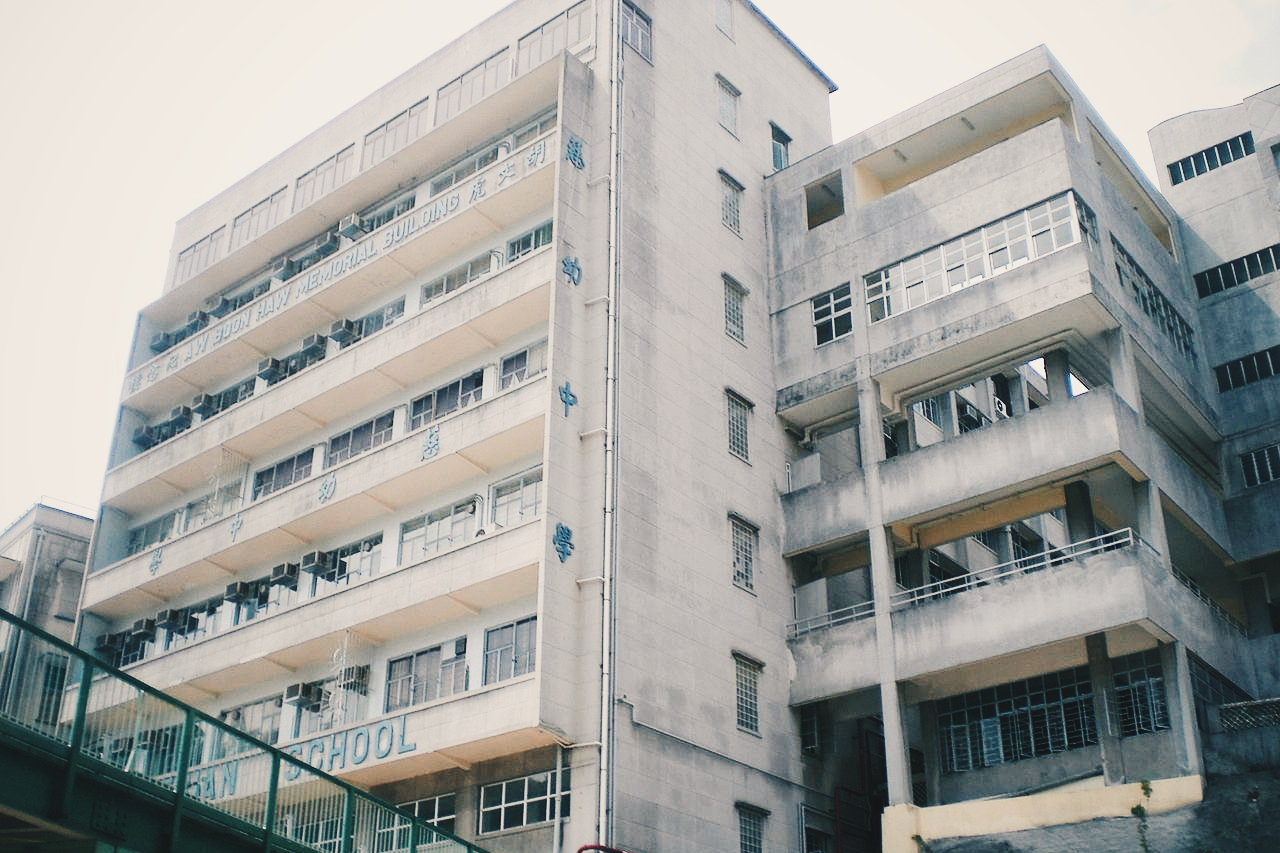
The view of Salesian English School Main Building (Old Wing)

- Andrew Cheng, politician and solicitor, former Democratic Party member of the Legislative Council of Hong Kong
- Tony F. Chan, mathematician, president of the Hong Kong University of Science and Technology, assistant director of the Mathematical and Physical Sciences Directorate at the US National Science Foundation
- Raymond Chan Chi-chuen, member of the Legislative Council of Hong Kong (representing the New Territories East constituency) and former chief executive officer of Hong Kong Reporter.
- Kenneth Ma, Hong Kong actor
- Yip Sai Wing, Hong Kong musician, drummer and co-founder of the rock band Beyond
- Ng Cho-nam, SBS, JP, associate professor of geography at the University of Hong Kong, former director of the Conservancy Association
- Chang Kwong Yin, Professional football player of Eastern SC
