= List of shipwrecks of Hong Kong =

This is a non-exhaustive list of shipwrecks located in or around Hong Kong by year.

== 1835 ==
Date	Name	National Affiliation / Homeport	Type	Owner/Operator	Tonnage	Cause	Deaths	Notes
5 August 1835	HMS Raleigh	East Indies Station	18-gun Cruizer-class brig-sloop	Royal Navy	317 GRT	Unknown	Unknown	Dismasted and wrecked in typhoon while at anchor off Hong Kong, later repaired and returned to service.

== 1841 ==
Date	Name	National Affiliation / Homeport	Type	Owner/Operator	Tonnage	Cause	Deaths	Notes
21 July 1841	SS Prince George	Calcutta	East Indiaman	East India Company	317 GRT	1841 Hong Kong Typhoon	Unknown	Smashed to pieces during typhoon at Hong Kong but her crew was saved and taken aboard Queen.
21 July 1841	HMS Hebe	East Indies Station	46-gun Leda-class frigate	Royal Navy	372.5 NRT (BOM)	1841 Hong Kong Typhoon	Unknown	Dismasted in typhoon while at anchor off Hong Kong, later repaired and returned to service.
21 July 1841	HMS Louisa	East Indies Station	14-gun Cruizer-class brig-sloop	Royal Navy	83 NRT (BOM)	1841 Hong Kong Typhoon	Unknown	Dismasted and wrecked in typhoon while at anchor off Hong Kong, later repaired and returned to service.
21 July 1841	HMS Royalist	East Indies Station	Unknown	Royal Navy	372.5 NRT (BOM)	1841 Hong Kong Typhoon	Unknown	Dismasted in typhoon while at anchor off Hong Kong, later repaired and returned to service.
21 July 1841	HMS Sulphur	East Indies Station	10-gun Hecla-class bomb vessel	Royal Navy	372.5 NRT (BOM)	1841 Hong Kong Typhoon	Unknown	Dismasted in typhoon while at anchor off Hong Kong, later repaired and returned to service.

The Nautical Magazine and Naval Chronicle for 1842 states that the Typhoon of 1841 resulted in the total loss of 9 vessels: 2 barques, 1 ship, 1 brig, 4 schooners and the cutter HMS Louisa. In addition to this, a great number of smaller harbour going craft and Tanka boats were completely destroyed. 4 other large vessels and 6 prize junks were driven ashore and wrecked with the prize junks mostly wrecked on and around Cawee-Chow (Likely at modern-day Kau Yi Chau). 10 other ships were dismasted including HMS Sulphur, HMS Royalist and HMS Hebe. 11 ships suffered losses of bowsprits or one or more masts and 2 lost their rudders. Destruction also ravaged various shore establishments and it was estimated that around 300 people lost their lives in the disaster.

== 1843 ==
Date	Name	National Affiliation / Homeport	Type	Owner/Operator	Tonnage	Cause	Deaths	Notes
28 September 1843	SS Moira	Calcutta	brig	Owen & Company	650 GRT	Unknown	Unknown	Disappeared without a trace while sailing from Chusan to Hong Kong, presumed foundered with the loss of all hands.
30 November 1843	SS Ann Maria	United Kingdom	brig	Unknown (British)	Unknown	Unknown	Unknown	Ran aground and wrecked at Hong Kong.

== 1846 ==
Date	Name	National Affiliation / Homeport	Type	Owner/Operator	Tonnage	Cause	Deaths	Notes
20 June 1846	HMS Pluto	British Raj	steamship	East India Company	396 GRT	Unknown 1846 typhoon	Unknown	wrecked in a typhoon at "Chick Py-wan", Hong Kong. Refloated on 17 July.
1 October 1846	SS Amy Robsart	Bristol	schooner	Unknown (British)	79 GRT	Unknown	Unknown	Disappeared without a trace while sailing from Bristol to Hong Kong, presumed foundered with the loss of all hands.

== 1847 ==
Date	Name	National Affiliation / Homeport	Type	Owner/Operator	Tonnage	Cause	Deaths	Notes
17 July 1847	SS Don Juan	Kingdom of Spain	schooner	Unknown (Spanish)	Unknown	Unknown	Unknown	Departed from Hong Kong for Shanghai, disappeared without a trace, presumed lost with all hands.

== 1848 ==
Date	Name	National Affiliation / Homeport	Type	Owner/Operator	Tonnage	Cause	Deaths	Notes
29 July 1848	SS John Christian	Liverpool	clipper	Unknown (British)	Unknown	Unknown	Unknown	Last sighted in the South Atlantic whilst on a voyage from Liverpool to Hong Kong. No further trace, presumed foundered with the loss of all hands.
31 August 1848	SS Charles Wirgman	United States	brig	Unknown (American)	Unknown	Unknown 1848 Typhoon	Unknown	Driven ashore and wrecked in a typhoon at Hong Kong.
31 August 1848	SS Eliza Stewart	United Kingdom	clipper	Unknown (British)	Unknown	Unknown 1848 Typhoon	Unknown	Wrecked in a typhoon at Hong Kong after being hit by British ship SS John Laird and subsequently smashing into Spanish ship SS Dos Hermanos.
31 August 1848	SS Helen Stewart	United Kingdom	barque	Unknown (British)	Unknown	Unknown 1848 Typhoon	Unknown	Wrecked in a typhoon at Hong Kong after being driven ashore at Green Island.
31 August 1848	SS Hermes	United Kingdom	barque	Unknown (British)	Unknown	Unknown 1848 Typhoon	Unknown	Wrecked in a typhoon at Hong Kong after being driven ashore, later refloated.
31 August 1848	SS Kein Heem	Netherlands	barque	Unknown (Dutch)	Unknown	Unknown 1848 Typhoon	Unknown	Wrecked in a typhoon at Hong Kong after being driven ashore at Shek O with the loss of all but three of her crew.
1 September 1848	SS Calder	London	brig	Unknown (British)	Unknown	Unknown 1848 Typhoon	Unknown	Wrecked in a typhoon while underway from Hong Kong to London and towed back to Hong Kong for repairs.
1 September 1848	SS Constant	London	barque	Unknown (British)	Unknown	Unknown 1848 Typhoon	Unknown	Wrecked in a typhoon while underway from Hong Kong to Liverpool and towed back to Hong Kong for repairs.
1 September 1848	SS Daniel Watson	London	brig	Unknown (British)	Unknown	Unknown 1848 Typhoon	Unknown	Wrecked in a typhoon at Hong Kong.
1 September 1848	SS Dos Hermanos	Kingdom of Spain	brig	Unknown (British)	Unknown	Unknown 1848 Typhoon	Unknown	Wrecked in a typhoon at Hong Kong after being dashed against SS Eliza Stewart.
1 September 1848	SS Hindostan	United Kingdom	clipper	Unknown (British)	Unknown	Unknown 1848 Typhoon	Unknown	Wrecked in a typhoon at Hong Kong while underway from Hong Kong to Shanghai.
1 September 1848	SS Island Queen	United Kingdom	schooner	Unknown (British)	Unknown	Unknown 1848 Typhoon	Unknown	Wrecked in a typhoon at Hong Kong while underway from Hong Kong to Shanghai.
1 September 1848	SS Juliane	Free Hanseatic City of Bremen	schooner	Unknown (Bremenese)	Unknown	Unknown 1848 Typhoon	Unknown	Wrecked in a typhoon at Hong Kong.
1 September 1848	SS Salopian	United Kingdom	barque	Unknown (British)	Unknown	Unknown 1848 Typhoon	Unknown	Wrecked in a typhoon at Hong Kong and dismasted off Green Island.
1 September 1848	SS San F. Xavier	Portugal	schooner	Unknown (Portuguese)	Unknown	Unknown 1848 Typhoon	Unknown	Wrecked in a typhoon at Hong Kong and driven ashore.
1 October 1848	SS Kelpie	United Kingdom	opium clipper brig	Unknown (British)	Unknown	Unknown	Unknown	Ex-slave ship departed from Hong Kong for Shanghai, disappeared without a trace, presumed lost with all hands.
1 October 1848	SS Mischief	United Kingdom	clipper	Unknown (British)	Unknown	Unknown	Unknown	Disappeared without a trace while sailing from Hong Kong to Shanghai, presumed foundered with the loss of all hands.

== 1855 ==
Date	Name	National Affiliation / Homeport	Type	Owner/Operator	Tonnage	Cause	Deaths	Notes
4 August 1855	20 Chinese war junks	Kuhlan Pirate Fleet	War Junks	Chinese Pirates	Unknown	Battle of Tai O Bay	500	Action off Tai O, Hong Kong to rescue captured merchant vessels held by a fleet of armed war-junks. British and American forces defeated the pirates in one of the last major battles between Chinese pirate fleets and western navies. An estimated 500 pirates were killed in action, drowned, or were wounded. Around 1,000 pirates were taken prisoner.

== 1874 ==
Date	Name	National Affiliation / Homeport	Type	Owner/Operator	Tonnage	Cause	Deaths	Notes
22 September 1874	SS Leonor	Kingdom of Spain	South America-Macao trade steamer	Douglas Lapraik & Company	408 GRT	1874 Hong Kong typhoon	Unknown	Sank at the Douglas Lapraik & Company wharf after attempting to steam full astern while at anchor. Foundered and also damaged the wharf with loss of life including that of its Spanish captain.
22 September 1874	SS Albay	Kingdom of Spain	South America-Macao trade steamer	Douglas Lapraik & Company (Consigned)	260 GRT	1874 Hong Kong typhoon	Unknown	Sank at the Douglas Lapraik & Company wharf shortly after arriving in Hong Kong. She was dragged from her moorings without power after previously shutting off her engines, foundered and wrecked.
22 September 1874	SS Mindanao	Hong Kong	Barque	Unknown (British)	426 GRT	1874 Hong Kong typhoon	Unknown	Sank at Victoria Harbour, later refloated.
22 September 1874	SS Malvern	Hong Kong	Barque	Unknown (British)	410 GRT	1874 Hong Kong typhoon	Unknown	Shattered to pieces and sunk at Possession Point (while at anchor) when the barque SS Falcon was blown on top of her, lost with all hands including the captain, his wife and children, later refloated.
22 September 1874	SS Courier	Hong Kong	Barque	Unknown (British)	385 GRT	1874 Hong Kong typhoon	Unknown	Sank at the Sulphur Channel, later refloated.
22 September 1874	SS Imogen	Hong Kong	Barque	Unknown (British)	383 GRT	1874 Hong Kong typhoon	Unknown	Sank at West Point, later refloated.
22 September 1874	SS Maury	German Empire	Barque	Unknown (German)	389 GRT	1874 Hong Kong typhoon	Unknown	Sank at Green Island, later refloated.
22 September 1874	SS Alderbaran	German Empire	Barque	Unknown (German)	305 GRT	1874 Hong Kong typhoon	Unknown	Sank at Green Island, later refloated.
22 September 1874	SS Macao	Republic of Peru	Steamer	Unknown (Peruvian)	603 GRT	1874 Hong Kong typhoon	Unknown	Sank at Tsing Yi, total loss.
22 September 1874	SS Lowtoe	Kingdom of Siam	Schooner	Unknown (Siamese)	575 GRT	1874 Hong Kong typhoon	Unknown	Sank at Green Island, total loss.
22 September 1874	SS Dudu	Kingdom of Siam	Barque	Unknown (Siamese)	322 GRT	1874 Hong Kong typhoon	Unknown	Sank at Green Island, total loss.
22 September 1874	SS Seaforth	Kingdom of Siam	Barque	Unknown (Siamese)	311 GRT	1874 Hong Kong typhoon	Unknown	Sank at Green Island, total loss.
22 September 1874	SS Amoy	Kingdom of Siam	Steamer	Unknown (Siamese)	262 GRT	1874 Hong Kong typhoon	Unknown	Sank at Green Island, later refloated.
22 September 1874	SS Lizzie H	United States of America	Barque	Unknown (American)	806 GRT	1874 Hong Kong typhoon	Unknown	Sank at Victoria Harbour, total loss.
22 September 1874	SS Alaska	United States of America	paddle steamer	Unknown (American)	4,011 GRT	1874 Hong Kong typhoon	Unknown	Blown ashore at Aberdeen, later refloated.
22 September 1874	SS Blue Bell	Hong Kong	Steamer	Unknown (British)	27 GRT	1874 Hong Kong typhoon	Unknown	Sank at Kennedy Town, later refloated.
22 September 1874	SS Early Bird	Hong Kong	Steamer	Unknown (British)	16 GRT	1874 Hong Kong typhoon	Unknown	Sank at Victoria Harbour, later refloated.
22 September 1874	SS Everhard	German Empire	Barque	Unknown (German)	632 GRT	1874 Hong Kong typhoon	Unknown	Foundered and sank northeast of Lantau Island, total loss.
22 September 1874	HMS Flamer	China Station	Albacore-class gunboat	Royal Navy	232 GRT	1874 Hong Kong typhoon	Unknown	Foundered and wrecked while tied up at the Central Praya, total loss.

== 1906 ==
Date	Name	National Affiliation / Homeport	Type	Owner/Operator	Tonnage	Cause	Deaths	Notes
18 September 1906	SS Albatross	Hong Kong	Mirs Bay-Hong Kong ferry	Unknown (British)	83 NRT	1906 Hong Kong typhoon	120	Sank near the Nine Pins with 120 lives lost including the Captain (Patrick) and Chief Engineer (Wallace).
18 September 1906	SS Apenrade	German Empire	steamer	Unknown (German)	616 NRT	1906 Hong Kong typhoon	27	Foundered and sank west of Stonecutters Island with at least 27 lives lost.
18 September 1906	Canada	Hong Kong	Private launch of the late Mr. Rennie	Alfred Herbert Rennie	51 NRT	1906 Hong Kong typhoon	Unknown	Total loss after blown ashore at Junk Bay. Scrapped on site.
18 September 1906	SS Castellano	United States	hulk	Unknown (American)	171 NRT	1906 Hong Kong typhoon	Unknown	Blown ashore at Yau Ma Tei, scrapped.
18 September 1906	SS Changsha	Hong Kong	China-Australia trade and passenger steamer	Australian Oriental Line; Butterfield & Swire	2,269 GRT	1906 Hong Kong typhoon	None	Foundered at the Hong Kong and Whampoa Dock, refloated on 20 September.
18 September 1906	Chiukai Maru	Empire of Japan	transport steamer	Yoichimon Yamane	1,564 NRT	1906 Hong Kong typhoon	Unknown	Blown onto Kellett Island, later refloated and sank again due to the damage sustained in typhoon.
18 September 1906	SS Fatshan	Hong Kong	Hong Kong-Canton passenger steamer	Hong Kong, Canton & Macao Steamboat Company; China Navigation Company	2,260 GRT	1906 Hong Kong typhoon	None	Foundered at Hung Hom Bay after breaking loose from her company buoy and colliding with French mail steamer Polynesien, refloated on 28 September.
18 September 1906	Fronde	French Empire	Arquebuse-class destroyer	French Navy	323 NRT	1906 Hong Kong typhoon	5	Foundered and sank at the Yaumati Bay Torpedo Depot.
18 September 1906	SS Heungshan	Hong Kong	passenger steamer	Hong Kong, Canton & Macao Steamboat Company	1,985 GRT	1906 Hong Kong typhoon	Unknown	Severely damaged and holed through bottom after blown ashore at San Chou Island.
18 September 1906	SS Hoichung	Hong Kong	river steamer	Unknown (British)	Unknown	1906 Hong Kong typhoon	Unknown	Foundered and wrecked at Yaumati Bay, a total loss. Scrapped at Yaumati.
18 September 1906	SS Hongkong	Hong Kong	river steamer	Unknown (British-Chinese)	413 NRT	1906 Hong Kong typhoon	32	Blown across the harbour and dashed against the wall of the Boat Club Lagoon (police chamber). Foundered and wrecked near the Yaumati Bay Torpedo Depot with the loss of 32 lives including its Captain (Maxfield) and Chief Officer (J. Williamson).
18 September 1906	SS Johanne	German Empire	steamer	Unknown (German)	1,531 GRT	1906 Hong Kong typhoon	Unknown	Damaged in collision with steamer SS Chow Tai and submerged, later refloated.
18 September 1906	SS Kat On	Hong Kong	steamer	Unknown (British)	160 NRT	1906 Hong Kong typhoon	Unknown	Foundered and stranded at Hunghom Bay, total loss.
18 September 1906	SS Kinshan	Hong Kong	Hong Kong-Canton passenger steamer	Hong Kong, Canton & Macao Steamboat Company; China Navigation Company	2,861 GRT	1906 Hong Kong typhoon	Unknown	Blown ashore at Tai Lam Chow Island near the Capsuimoon and Castle Peak are, later refloated.
18 September 1906	SS Kongnam	Hong Kong	Hong Kong-West River steamer	Butterfield & Swire	402 NRT	1906 Hong Kong typhoon	10	Foundered at her moorings and sunk at Yaumati Bay with the loss of 10 lives including two (Donaldson) children.
18 September 1906	SS Kwongchow	Hong Kong	Hong Kong-West River steamer	Shin On Steamship Company	507 NRT	1906 Hong Kong typhoon	400	Foundered and sank at Kowloon Point with the loss of over 400 lives including its Captain (Mead) and 3rd Engineer (Morgan). After the typhoon, its masts and funnel were visible above the waterline between the Star Ferry Pier and the Godwin Company Wharf.
18 September 1906	SS Macau	Qing Empire	steamer	Unknown (Chinese)	237 NRT	1906 Hong Kong typhoon	Unknown	Foundered and sank at Yaumati Bay, scrapped.
18 September 1906	SS Monteagle	Liverpool	Hong Kong-West River steamer	Canadian Pacific Railway Company	6,955 GRT	1906 Hong Kong typhoon	Unknown	Broke free from her moorings and was blown ashore near the ruins of The Hong Kong and Kowloon Wharf and Godown Company harbourfront wharfs.
18 September 1906	SS Pakkong	Hong Kong	Hong Kong-Canton steamer	Unknown (British)	295 NRT	1906 Hong Kong typhoon	Unknown	Foundered and sunk at Yaumati Bay, total loss.
18 September 1906	SS Petrarch	German Empire	steamer	Unknown (German)	1,693 GRT	1906 Hong Kong typhoon	Unknown	Stranded at Hong Kong, refloated and broken up at Hong Kong.
18 September 1906	HMS Phoenix	China Station	Phoenix-class sloop	Royal Navy	1,050 NRT	1906 Hong Kong typhoon	Unknown	Foundered and sunk at Yaumati Bay Torpedo Depot, total loss.
18 September 1906	Unknown revenue schooner	Qing Empire	schooner	Viceroy of Liangguang	80 NRT	1906 Hong Kong typhoon	Unknown	Foundered and sank at Yaumati Bay, scrapped.
18 September 1906	SS Sam Cheong	Hong Kong	river steamer	Unknown (British-Chinese)	389 NRT	1906 Hong Kong typhoon	Unknown	Foundered and sunk alongside Canton Wharf, total loss.
18 September 1906	SS Signal	German Empire	steamer	Unknown (German)	907 NRT	1906 Hong Kong typhoon	Unknown	Dashed against the rocks at Yaumati Bay and later beached.
18 September 1906	SS Sorsagen	United States	steamer	Unknown (American)	420 NRT	1906 Hong Kong typhoon	Unknown	Foundered and sank alongside the Kowloon docks.
18 September 1906	SS Sun On	Hong Kong	river steamer	Unknown (British-Chinese)	113 NRT	1906 Hong Kong typhoon	Unknown	Foundered and sunk at Yaumati Bay, later refloated.
18 September 1906	SS Takhing	Hong Kong	Canton-Wuchow Line steamer	China Navigation Company; Indo-China Steam Navigation Company	395 NRT	1906 Hong Kong typhoon	Unknown	Blown ashore at Sham Shui Po, later refloated.
18 September 1906	SS Wingchai	Hong Kong	Hong Kong-Macao line steamer	Tata & Company	548 NRT	1906 Hong Kong typhoon	20	Blown ashore and dashed on the rocks at Sham Shui Po with at least 20 dead, scrapping rights sold at auction.
13 October 1906	SS Hankow	Hong Kong	passenger paddle steamer	China Navigation Company	3,073 GRT	Fire at wharfside	111	Completely gutted by fire while dockside at Sheung Wan and carrying around 2,000 passengers, at least 111 lives lost. Ship burned to skeleton, all cargo lost.

== 1908 ==
Date	Name	National Affiliation / Homeport	Type	Owner/Operator	Tonnage	Cause	Deaths	Notes
27 July 1908	SS Ying King	Hong Kong	Canton-Hong Kong Line ferry	Sing On Steamship Company	768 NRT	1908 Hong Kong typhoon	421	Sank north of the Lantau Island with 421 lives lost including the Captain (Page) and Officers (Fotheringham and Newman).
27 July 1908	SS Pocahontas	Liverpool	steamer	Watts, Watts & Company	2,675 GRT	1908 Hong Kong typhoon	0	Blown ashore at southern Stonecutters Island and severely damaged, refloated and broken up at Hong Kong.
27 July 1908	SS Lai Sang	Hong Kong	steamer	Unknown (British)	Unknown	1908 Hong Kong typhoon	0	Blown ashore at southern Stonecutters Island and severely damaged.

== 1936 ==
Date	Name	National Affiliation / Homeport	Type	Owner/Operator	Tonnage	Cause	Deaths	Notes
17 August 1936	HMS Hydrangea	China Station	Arabis-class sloop	Royal Navy	1,250 GRT	Unknown 1936 Hong Kong typhoon	Unknown	Wrecked at Stonecutters Island, later sold to breakers.

== 1937 ==
Date	Name	National Affiliation / Homeport	Type	Owner/Operator	Tonnage	Cause	Deaths	Notes
26 March 1937	SS Jinkai Maru	Kobe	steamer	Sugaya KK	3,835 GRT	Unknown	Unknown	Ran aground at Waglan Island, sank on 26 March.
2 September 1937	SS An Lee	Hong Kong	steamer	Unknown (British)	1,668 GRT	1937 Great Hong Kong typhoon	Unknown	Built by Schiffsw. V.Henry Koch of South Africa in 1905. Blown ashore and wrecked after slamming into HMS Diamond, HMS Duchess and HMS Suffolk and finally dashing upon the Praya at Central, later refloated on 28 December. 3 of her crew were rescued by HMS Suffolk. Captured by the IJN in WWII and sunk after striking a mine on 25 June 1944 off Shimonoseki.
2 September 1937	Asama Maru	Yokohama	Yokohama-San Francisco Line	Nippon Yusen	16,975 GRT	1937 Great Hong Kong typhoon	Unknown	Grounded at Chai Wan near the Lyemun Pass after being ripped from her moorings while at anchor at Kowloon Bay (far opposite side of Victoria Harbour) and colliding with several other ships including the SS Conte Verde and SS Talamba, later refloated in 1938 and resumed service with NYK.
2 September 1937	SS Bonneville	Kingdom of Norway	steamer	Unknown (Norwegian)	4,665 GRT	1937 Great Hong Kong typhoon	Unknown	Blown ashore and wrecked off Stonecutters Island, later refloated.
2 September 1937	SS Conte Verde	Genoa	Far East Line Steamer	Lloyd Triestino	18,761 GRT	1937 Great Hong Kong typhoon	Unknown	Ran aground off the shores of Cape Collinson after smashing into the Asama Maru, later refloated.
2 September 1937	HMS Cornflower	China Station	Arabis-class sloop	Royal Navy	1,250 GRT	1937 Great Hong Kong typhoon	Unknown	Blown ashore and ran aground off Causeway Bay, later refloated.
2 September 1937	SS Emmy	Cephalonia	steamer	Rokos Vergottis	3,895 GRT	1937 Great Hong Kong typhoon	Unknown	Blown ashore and wrecked at Hong Kong, later refloated on 16 September.
2 September 1937	SS Eng Lee	Hong Kong	steamer	Unknown (British)	1,394 GRT	1937 Great Hong Kong typhoon	Unknown	Blown ashore and wrecked off Hung Hom, later refloated.
2 September 1937	SS Dahun	Hong Kong	steamer	Unknown (British)	2,709 GRT	1937 Great Hong Kong typhoon	Unknown	Blown ashore and wrecked off Tsing Yi.
2 September 1937	SS Feng Lee	China	Steamer	Ching Kee Steam Navigation Company	2,061 GRT	1937 Great Hong Kong typhoon	Unknown	Blown ashore near Hung Hom, later refloated.
2 September 1937	SS Gertrude Maersk	Copenhagen	Steamer	A.P. Møller – Mærsk A/S	5,038 GRT	1937 Great Hong Kong typhoon	Unknown	Blown ashore and ran aground off Sai Ying Pun, later refloated.
2 September 1937	SS Hong Peng	Singapore	Hong Kong-Canton Line steamer	Ho Hong Steamship Company; Lim Peng Siang	4,055 GRT	1937 Great Hong Kong typhoon	0	Blown ashore near Quarry Bay, later refloated.
2 September 1937	SS Hsin Ming	Shanghai	Passenger and cargo steamer	China Merchants Steam Navigation Company	2,133 GRT	1937 Great Hong Kong typhoon	Unknown	Built by Napier and Miller for China Merchants Steam Navigation Company in 1907 as the SS Hsin Tsieh. Renamed as the Hsin Ming in 1909. Apparently in Hong Kong for repairs after being scuttled on the Yangtze on 12 August as a blockship. Blown ashore and wrecked off Ma Wan.
2 September 1937	SS Hsing Lee	Chefoo	steamer	Ching Kee Steam Navigation Company	1,174 GRT	1937 Great Hong Kong typhoon	Unknown	Blown ashore and wrecked off Stonecutters Island.
2 September 1937	SS Hsin Ping	Shanghai	Passenger and cargo steamer	Tai Ping Steamship Company; Chunghsing Steamship Company	1,833 GRT	1937 Great Hong Kong typhoon	Unknown	Built by American Steamboat Company for Tai Ping Steamship Company in 1917. Blown ashore and wrecked off northern Lantau Island.
2 September 1937	SS Hunan	Hong Kong	Steamer	China Navigation Company	2,827 GRT	1937 Great Hong Kong typhoon	Unknown	Blown ashore at western Peng Chau, later refloated and repaired at the Taikoo Dockyard.
2 September 1937	SS Kalgan	Hong Kong	steamer	China Navigation Company	2,655 GRT	1937 Great Hong Kong typhoon	Unknown	Blown ashore and wrecked off Tsimshatsui, later refloated.
2 September 1937	SS Kwangchow	Hong Kong	Steamer	China Navigation Company	2,626 GRT	1937 Great Hong Kong typhoon	Unknown	Blown ashore at western Sunshine Island, total loss.
2 September 1937	SS Kausing	Hong Kong	tug	Harbour Department	3,790 GRT	1937 Great Hong Kong typhoon	Unknown	Blown ashore and wrecked off Green Island.
2 September 1937	SS Luhsing	Hong Kong	Cargo Steamer	Unknown (British)	4,130 GRT	1937 Great Hong Kong typhoon	Unknown	Blown ashore and wrecked off northern Lantau Island.
2 September 1937	SS Moa Lee	China	Steamer	Unknown (Chinese)	1,946 GRT	1937 Great Hong Kong typhoon	Unknown	Foundered and sunk off Sai Ying Pun.
2 September 1937	SS Produce	Oslo	steamer	Nylands Mekaniske Verksted; Hans Kiær & Company	1,171 GRT	1937 Great Hong Kong typhoon	Unknown	Blown ashore and wrecked at Hong Kong, later refloated.
2 September 1937	SS Shenandoah	Unknown (Possibly American)	Steamer	Unknown (Possibly American)	720 GRT	1937 Great Hong Kong typhoon	Unknown	Blown ashore at Kowloon Bay.
2 September 1937	SS Sheng Lee	China	Steamer	Unknown (Chinese)	3,087 GRT	1937 Great Hong Kong typhoon	Unknown	Blown ashore near Quarry Bay, later refloated.
2 September 1937	SS Shuntien	Hong Kong	Shanghai-Tianjin Line steamer	China Navigation Company	3,059 GRT	1937 Great Hong Kong typhoon	Unknown	Blown ashore at Tsing Yi while undergoing maintenance, later refloated.
2 September 1937	SS Talamba	Calcutta	Calcutta-Japan Line Steamer	British India Steam Navigation Company	8,018 GRT	1937 Great Hong Kong typhoon	Unknown	Ran aground off the shores of Cape Collinson after smashing into the Asama Maru as she dragged in the shallow waters, stuck for several months on the rocks at Lyemun Pass, later refloated on 21 November 1937.
2 September 1937	SS Teh Hsing	Hong Kong	steamer	Unknown (British)	1,625 GRT	1937 Great Hong Kong typhoon	Unknown	Blown ashore and wrecked off Lantau Island, later refloated on 4 September.
2 September 1937	SS Tin Sang	Hong Kong	steamer	Unknown (British)	398 GRT	1937 Great Hong Kong typhoon	Unknown	Blown ashore and wrecked off Tsing Lung Tau, later refloated. Captured by Japanese during invasion of Hong Kong.
2 September 1937	SS Tymeric	Glasgow	Bank Line Steamer	Andrew Weir & Company	5,228 GRT	1937 Great Hong Kong typhoon	Unknown	Blown ashore near Quarry Bay, later refloated and sunk by German submarine U-123 in 1940.
2 September 1937	Unknown ferry	Hong Kong	Ferry	Unknown (British)	Unknown	1937 Great Hong Kong typhoon	Unknown	Blown ashore at Eastern Kowloon.
2 September 1937	Unknown steam launch	Hong Kong	Launch	Unknown (British)	Unknown	1937 Great Hong Kong typhoon	Unknown	Battered against the Praya and sunk at the Osaka Shosen Kaisha wharf.
2 September 1937	MS Van Heutsz	Batavia, Dutch East Indies	Ocean Liner	Koninklijke Paketvaart-Maatschappij	4,588 GRT	1937 Great Hong Kong typhoon	Unknown	Blown ashore after breaking loose from her anchor at Sai Ying Pun and ran aground at Green Island. The ship was carrying 1,200 refugees from Shanghai fleeing the ongoing war. Later refloated on 10 September.

== 1941 ==
Date	Name	National Affiliation / Homeport	Type	Owner/Operator	Tonnage	Cause	Deaths	Notes
11 December 1941	SS Tinley	Hong Kong	coaster steamer	Unknown (British)	420 GRT	Battle of Hong Kong	Unknown	Scuttled on 11 December at Hong Kong to prevent Japanese capture.
11 December 1941	SS Wawa	Panama	steamer	Wallem & Company	1,650 GRT	Battle of Hong Kong	Unknown	Scuttled on 11 December at Hong Kong to prevent Japanese capture. Raised, repaired and put in Japanese service as Awa Maru.
12 December 1941	SS Admiral Y. S. Williams	Manila	steamer	American Trading Company	3,252 GRT	Battle of Hong Kong	4	Scuttled at its moorings on 12 December to prevent its capture and use by the Imperial Japanese Navy. Later captured on 24 December by IJN, refloated and put into service. 29 of the crew captured and 4 killed.
12 December 1941	HMS Moth	China Station	Insect-class gunboat	Royal Navy	625 GRT	Battle of Hong Kong	Unknown	Scuttled at its moorings in Victoria Harbour to prevent its capture and use by the Imperial Japanese Navy. Later refloated and put into service by the IJN as the Suma (須磨).
12 December 1941	HMS Tamar	China Station	troopship	Royal Navy	4,650 GRT	Battle of Hong Kong	Unknown	Scuttled at its moorings in Victoria Harbour to prevent its capture and use by the Imperial Japanese Navy. Later discovered during the construction of the Central–Wan Chai Bypass.
16 December 1941	MTB 8	China Station	motor torpedo boat	Royal Navy	Unknown	Battle of Hong Kong	Unknown	Bombed, set on fire, and sunk at Hong Kong by Japanese aircraft.
19 December 1941	HMS Aldgate	China Station	boom defence vessel	Royal Navy	345 GRT	Battle of Hong Kong	Unknown	Scuttled at its moorings in Victoria Harbour to prevent its capture and use by the Imperial Japanese Navy.
19 December 1941	HMS Alliance	China Station	Alliance-class tugboat	Royal Navy	300 GRT	Battle of Hong Kong	Unknown	Scuttled at its moorings in Deep Water Bay to prevent its capture and use by the Imperial Japanese Navy.
19 December 1941	HMS Barlight	China Station	boom defence vessel	Royal Navy	730 GRT	Battle of Hong Kong	Unknown	Scuttled at its moorings in Victoria Harbour to prevent its capture and use by the Imperial Japanese Navy. Later refloated and put into service by IJN as the Ma-101.
19 December 1941	HMS Cornflower	China Station	Arabis-class	Royal Navy	1,250 GRT	Battle of Hong Kong	Unknown	Scuttled at its moorings in Victoria Harbour to prevent its capture and use by the Imperial Japanese Navy.
19 December 1941	RFA Ebonol	China Station	Arabis-class	Royal Fleet Auxiliary	1,175 GRT	Battle of Hong Kong	Unknown	Scuttled at Hong Kong to prevent its capture and use by the Imperial Japanese Navy. Later refloated and put into Japanese service as Enoshima Maru.
19 December 1941	HMS MTB 12	China Station	motor torpedo boat	Royal Navy	Unknown	Battle of Hong Kong	Unknown	Sunk at Hong Kong by Japanese landing craft.
19 December 1941	HMS MTB 26	China Station	motor torpedo boat	Royal Navy	Unknown	Battle of Hong Kong	Unknown	Sunk at Hong Kong by Japanese landing craft.
19 December 1941	HMS Poet Chaucer	China Station	Alliance-class tugboat	Royal Navy	239 GRT	Battle of Hong Kong	Unknown	Scuttled at its moorings in Deep Water Bay to prevent its capture and use by the Imperial Japanese Navy.
19 December 1941	HMS Watergate	China Station	boom defence vessel	Royal Navy	300 GRT	Battle of Hong Kong	Unknown	Scuttled at its moorings in Deep Water Bay to prevent its capture and use by the Imperial Japanese Navy.
19 December 1941	HMS Redstart	China Station	Linnet-class minelayer	Royal Navy	425 GRT	Battle of Hong Kong	Unknown	Scuttled at Hong Kong to prevent its capture and use by the Imperial Japanese Navy.
19 December 1941	HMS Tern	China Station	Tern class gunboat	Royal Navy	Unknown	Battle of Hong Kong	Unknown	Scuttled at Hong Kong to prevent its capture and use by the Imperial Japanese Navy.
21 December 1941	Cicala	China Station	Insect-class gunboat	Royal Navy	645 GRT	Battle of Hong Kong	1	bombed and sunk at Hong Kong by Japanese aircraft with the loss of one crew member. Survivors were rescued by MTB 10.
21 December 1941	Krechett 99	Soviet Far East Fleet	transport ship	Soviet Navy	2,017 GRT	Battle of Hong Kong	0	Sunk after being hit by Japanese bombers and land based artillery while moored near the Taikoo Dockyard at Lei Yue Mun, crew left ships prior to their sinking with permission from Japanese troops.
21 December 1941	Sergei Lazo 09	Soviet Far East Fleet	transport ship	Soviet Navy	1,981 GRT	Battle of Hong Kong	0	Sunk after being hit by Japanese bombers and land based artillery while moored for overhaul at Tsuen Wan Bay off West Kowloon, crew left ships prior to their sinking with permission from Japanese troops.
21 December 1941	Simferopol 12	Soviet Far East Fleet	transport ship	Soviet Navy	2,750 GRT	Battle of Hong Kong	0	Sunk after being hit by Japanese bombers and land based artillery while being repaired at dry dock 1 of the Hong Kong and Whampoa Dock, crew left ships prior to their sinking with permission from Japanese troops. Later repaired and retained by the Japanese.
21 December 1941	Svirstroi 19	Soviet Far East Fleet	transport ship	Soviet Navy	4,376 GRT	Battle of Hong Kong	0	Sunk after being hit by Japanese bombers and land based artillery while moored for overhaul at Tsuen Wan Bay off West Kowloon, crew left ships prior to their sinking with permission from Japanese troops. Later repaired and retained by the Japanese.
25 December 1941	MTB 7	China Station	60-foot-class motor torpedo boat	Royal Navy	Unknown	Battle of Hong Kong	Unknown	Scuttled in Mirs Bay.
25 December 1941	MTB 9	China Station	60-foot-class motor torpedo boat	Royal Navy	Unknown	Battle of Hong Kong	Unknown	Scuttled in Mirs Bay.
25 December 1941	MTB 10	China Station	60-foot-class motor torpedo boat	Royal Navy	Unknown	Battle of Hong Kong	Unknown	Scuttled in Mirs Bay.
25 December 1941	MTB 11	China Station	60-foot-class motor torpedo boat	Royal Navy	Unknown	Battle of Hong Kong	Unknown	Scuttled in Mirs Bay.
25 December 1941	MTB 27	China Station	55-foot-class motor torpedo boat	Royal Navy	Unknown	Battle of Hong Kong	Unknown	Scuttled in Mirs Bay.
25 December 1941	HMS Robin	China Station	Heron-class gunboat	Royal Navy	236 GRT	Battle of Hong Kong	Unknown	Scuttled at Hong Kong to prevent its capture and use by the Imperial Japanese Navy.
25 December 1941	HMS Thracian	China Station	S-class destroyer	Royal Navy	1,092 GRT	Battle of Hong Kong	Unknown	Ran aground off Round Island on 16 December. Scuttled to prevent its capture and use by the Imperial Japanese Navy. Later refloated and put into service by the IJN as Patrol Boat No. 101.
December ? 1941	SS An Lee	Hong Kong	steamer	Unknown (British)	1,668 GRT	Battle of Hong Kong	Unknown	Seized by the Imperial Japanese Navy at Hong Kong after being scuttled.
December ? 1941	SS Tai Poo Sek	Kwang Chow Wan	Hong Kong-Kwang Chow Wan Line steamer	Shun Cheong Steamship Company	1,960 GRT	Battle of Hong Kong	Unknown	Seized by the Imperial Japanese Navy at Hong Kong after being scuttled.

== 1947 ==
Date	Name	National Affiliation / Homeport	Type	Owner/Operator	Tonnage	Cause	Deaths	Notes
4 February 1947	SS Sai On	Hong Kong	Canton-Hong Kong ferry	Sai On Navigation Company	1,950 NRT	Fire	300	Caught fire at its moorings near Connaught Road Central resulting in the loss of 300 lives.

== 1962 ==
Date	Name	National Affiliation / Homeport	Type	Owner/Operator	Tonnage	Cause	Deaths	Notes
1 September 1962	SS Tai Kwong 1	Hong Kong	steamer	Unknown (British)	Unknown	Typhoon Wanda	0	Sunk near a public pier with bow in the air and dashed against the pier during Typhoon Wanda.

== 1971 ==
Date	Name	National Affiliation / Homeport	Type	Owner/Operator	Tonnage	Cause	Deaths	Notes
16 August 1971	SS Fatshan	Hong Kong	Hong Kong-Macao passenger steamer	Tai Tak Hing Shipping Company	2,639 GRT	Typhoon Rose	88	sunk 120 metres (390 ft) offshore of Lantau Island at a depth of about 6 metres (20 ft).

== 1972 ==
Date	Name	National Affiliation / Homeport	Type	Owner/Operator	Tonnage	Cause	Deaths	Notes
9 January 1972	SS Seawise University	Hong Kong	World Campus Afloat program ship	Orient Overseas Container Line	83,673 GRT	Suspicious fire	0	Destroyed by suspicious fire and sunk after being capsized by large volume of water taken on to extinguish said fire at 22°19.717′N 114°06.733′E.

== 1983 ==
Date	Name	National Affiliation / Homeport	Type	Owner/Operator	Tonnage	Cause	Deaths	Notes
9 September 1983	SS City of Lobito	Limassol	Refrigerated Cargo Ship	Lifedream Cia Nav SA	6,256 GRT	Typhoon Ellen	0	Wrecked off Cheung Chau during Typhoon Ellen, broken up in Hong Kong in 1984.

== 2008 ==
Date	Name	National Affiliation / Homeport	Type	Owner/Operator	Tonnage	Cause	Deaths	Notes
22 March 2008	SS Neftegaz-67	Guangzhou	Anchor handling tug supply vessel	Naftogaz of Ukraine	2,723 GRT	Collision at sea.	18	Collided with Chinese bulk carrier Yao Hai off The Brothers and began listing to starboard and sinking shortly after the collision resulting in the deaths of 18 Ukrainian crew members. Salvaged 27 April 2008, refloated and reflagged as Chinese ship De Shun.

== 2012 ==
Date	Name	National Affiliation / Homeport	Type	Owner/Operator	Tonnage	Cause	Deaths	Notes
1 October 2012	SS Lamma IV	Hong Kong	Pleasure craft	Hongkong Electric Company	184 GRT	collision at sea with Sea Smooth	39	collided with Hong Kong & Kowloon Ferry ship Sea Smooth off Lamma Island, killing 39 of the 127 on board.

== See also ==
- List of missing ships
- List of maritime disasters
- Category: Lists of shipwrecks by year
