= HMS Linnet =

Nine ships of the Royal Navy have been named HMS Linnet after the linnet, a bird of the finch family:

- HMS Linnet (1806) was a 14-gun brig, originally named Speedwell, which the French ship Gloire captured off Madeira in 1813. She became the American privateer Bunker's Hill. Pomone and Cydnus recaptured her on 4 March 1814 but she was not taken back into Royal Navy service.
- HMS Linnet (1813) was a 16-gun brig that operated on the Canadian Lakes.
- HMS Linnet (1817) was a survey cutter launched in 1817 and sold in 1833 for breaking up.
- HMS Linnet (1835) was an 8-gun brig launched in 1835 and sold in 1866.
- HMS Linnet (1860) was a Britomart-class steam powered gunboat launched in 1860 and broken up in 1872.
- HMS Linnet (1880) was a composite screw gunvessel launched in 1880. After she was sold in 1904, the ship was converted to a salvage vessel.
- HMS Linnet was a tender originally named Napier of Magdala. She was renamed Hasty in 1913 and sold in 1920.
- HMS Linnet (1913) was a Laforey-class destroyer, originally planned as HMS Havock. She was launched in 1913 and sold in 1921.
- HMS Linnet (M69) was a Linnet-class minelayer launched in 1938 and broken up in 1964.

== See also ==
- Linnet (disambiguation)
- USS Linnet
