= HMS Ringdove =

Seven ships of the Royal Navy have borne the name HMS Ringdove, another name for the common wood pigeon:

- HMS Ringdove (1806) was an 18-gun Cruizer-class brig-sloop launched in 1806 and sold in 1829.
- HMS Ringdove (1833) was a 16-gun brig-sloop launched in 1833 and broken up in 1850.
- HMS Ringdove (1856) was a wooden screw gunvessel launched in 1856, sold in 1865 and broken up in 1866.
- HMS Ringdove (1867) was a wooden screw gunvessel launched in 1867 and sold in 1882.
- HMS Ringdove (1889) was a Redbreast-class composite screw gunboat launched in 1889. She became a salvage vessel in 1915 and was renamed HMS Melita, and was sold in 1920.
- HMS Ringdove was a salvage vessel, launched in 1888 as the composite screw sloop HMS Melita. She was renamed HMS Ringdove on her conversion in 1915 and was sold in 1920.
- HMS Ringdove (1938) was a Linnet-class minelayer launched in 1938 and sold to the Pakistani government in 1950 as a pilot vessel.
