= Fatshan (disambiguation) =

"Fatshan", sometimes referred to as "Foshan", is a prefecture-level city in central Guangdong Province, China.

Fatshan may also refer to:

== Battles ==
- Battle of Fatshan Creek, part of the Second Opium War.

== Places ==
- Foshan, Guangdong Province, China.

== Railways ==
- Canton Fatshan Railway

== Ships ==
- SS Fatshan, 1887 ship.
- SS Fatshan, 1933 ship.
