= SS Fatshan =

SS Fatshan may refer to the following ships:

- SS Fatshan (1887)
- SS Fatshan (1933)
