= Linnet (disambiguation) =

Linnet may refer to:

- Common linnet, Carduelis cannabina
- Yemen linnet, Carduelis yemenensis
- Warsangli linnet, Carduelis johannis
- Linnet Mazingaidzo, Zimbabwean politician
- Linnet, 1900 novel by Grant Allen
- Linnet Ridgeway-Doyle, main character in Death on the Nile novel by Agatha Christie.

== See also ==
- HMS Linnet, the name of nine ships of the Royal Navy
- USS Linnet, the name of three ships of the US Navy, and one planned one
