= Hongkong, Canton & Macao Steamboat Company =

British merchant shipping and maritime trading company

Hongkong Canton & Macao Steamboat Company Limited
- flag of the Hongkong Canton & Macao Steamboat Company.
- Native name: 省港澳輪船公司
- Company type: Private company limited by shares
- Traded as: HKCR No. 0000002
- Industry: Shipping, Transport, Freight, Merchant shipping
- Founded: October 20, 1865; 160 years ago at Hong Kong
- Founder: Douglas Lapraik, J. J. dos Remedios, A. E. Vaucher, Arthur Sassoon, R. Solomon, D. Ruttunjee, Bapoorjee Pallunjee Ranjee
- Defunct: April 28, 1958
- Fate: Defunct
- Headquarters: 20 Des Voeux Road Central, British Hong Kong
- Area served: China trade
- Key people: Douglas Lapraik, She Tat-cheong, Percy Hobson Holyoak, A. O. Lang, Phineas Ryrie, Emanuel Raphael Belilios, William Keswick
- Products: Ship Management, Ferry, Ocean liners, Property, Container ships, Packet boats
- Total assets: $750,000 HKD (1865)
- Total equity: 7,500 shares at $100 HKD each (1865)

The Hongkong Canton & Macao Steamboat Company was a British merchant shipping and maritime trading company founded in 1865 in the Crown colony of Hong Kong.

== History ==
The Hongkong Canton & Macao Steamboat Company was founded on 20 October 1865 in Hong Kong by a collection of people tied to the shipping industry in order to support the market for regional ferry transport in the Canton area. The company was founded in the same year as the founding of the Companies Registry which granted it the company number 2, only behind the British Traders' Insurance Company.

The HCMSCo was one of the major shipping companies that participated in the Pearl River and China trade together with the China Navigation Company, China Merchants Steam Navigation Company and Jardine Matheson's Indo-China Steam Navigation Company since its creation in the 1860s. China Navigation Company and the HCMSCo had entered into a collaboration to jointly carry out business in the area which continued into the early 1900s.

With the opening of the West River Trade in 1897, HCMSCo together with the China Navigation Company and Jardine Matheson's Indo-China Steam Navigation Company, partnered together to open the new trade which became active from around 1897 to 1917 following the opening of several Treaty Ports like Wuzhou, Sanshui and Jiangmen to foreign trade in 1897. The West River trade declined with the advent of the Kowloon Canton Railway.

HCMSCo was dissolved on 28 April 1958.

=== List of HCMSCo ships ===
The following is an incomplete list of the HKC&MSCo fleet. A full illustrated fleet list has been published by H.W. Dick and S.A. Kentwell (see references below).

Name	Homeport	Type	Owner/Operator	Year Built	Tonnage	Route	Notes
SS Fire Dart	Hong Kong	paddle steamer	Hongkong Canton & Macao Steamboat Company	1860	660 GRT	Hong Kong-Canton Line	
SS White Cloud	Hong Kong	paddle steamer	Hongkong Canton & Macao Steamboat Company	Unknown	527 NRT	Canton-Macao Line	Wrecked at Macao during the 1874 Hong Kong typhoon.
SS Kiukang	Hong Kong	river steamer	Hongkong Canton & Macao Steamboat Company	Unknown	1,284 NRT	Hong Kong-Macao Line	
SS Powan	Hong Kong	river steamer	Hongkong Canton & Macao Steamboat Company	Unknown	1,842 NRT	Hong Kong-Canton Line	
SS Honam	Hong Kong	river steamer	Hongkong Canton & Macao Steamboat Company	Unknown	1,398 NRT	Hong Kong-Canton Line	
SS Kiungchow	Hong Kong	river steamer	Hongkong Canton & Macao Steamboat Company	Unknown	288 NRT	Hong Kong-Canton Line	
SS Fatshan	Hong Kong	ferry steamer	Hongkong Canton & Macao Steamboat Company; China Navigation Company	1887	2,260 GRT	Hong Kong-Canton Line	Sold to China Navigation Company
SS Kinshan	Hong Kong	ferry steamer	Hongkong Canton & Macao Steamboat Company; China Navigation Company	1903	2,861 GRT	Hong Kong-Canton Line	Acquired by HKCMSCo in 1935, captured by IJA in 1942, sunk by USS Thresher (SS-200) on 29 December 1942 south of Singapore

== See also ==
- China Navigation Company
- China trade
