= 1937 Hong Kong typhoon =

Pacific typhoon in 1937

1937 Great Hong Kong Typhoon
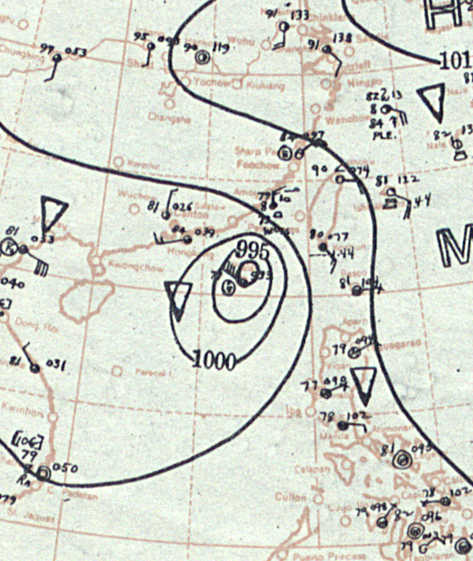
- Surface weather analysis of the typhoon on 1 September in the South China Sea

Meteorological history
- Formed: 24 August 1937
- Dissipated: 4 September 1937

Typhoon
- Highest winds: 185 km/h (115 mph)
- Lowest pressure: 953 hPa (mbar); 28.14 inHg

Overall effects
- Fatalities: At least 13,000
- Damage: $300,000 (1937 USD)
- Areas affected: Southern China, especially Hong Kong
- IBTrACS
- Part of the 1937 Pacific typhoon season

The 1937 Great Hong Kong Typhoon was one of the deadliest typhoons in Hong Kong history, with a death toll estimated between 11,000 and 13,000. Part of the 1937 Pacific typhoon season, the tropical cyclone originated on 24 August to the south of Guam, which proceeded generally to the west-northwest. On 1 September the storm entered the South China Sea, and early the next day, the typhoon passed just south of Hong Kong before making landfall in southern China. It weakened after moving ashore, dissipating on 3 September.

Ahead of the storm's landfall, the Hong Kong Observatory (HKO) (Note: At the time, the Hong Kong Observatory was known as Royal Observatory Hong Kong) issued warning signals and set off explosives, known as a typhoon bomb, to warn the public. During its closest approach, the typhoon produced wind gusts of at least 201 km/h (125 mph), although its true intensity was unknown, as the gusts surpassed the capacity of the anemometer. Unofficial nearby observations recorded gusts as high as 268 km/h (167 mph). The typhoon also produced heavy rainfall and high tides, with a high water mark at Tai Po estimated at 6.25 metres (20.5 ft). The typhoon killed at least 11,000 people, possibly as many as 13,000, many of them fishermen, with 1,855 fishing boats wrecked, as well as 28 ships bound for the ocean. Across the territory, the storm damaged houses, factories, roads, and rail lines, with damage estimated at HK$1 million (US$300,000). Nearby Macau lost 21 people.

== Background ==
Ahead of the typhoon, Victoria Harbour was described as "crowded" in newspapers, amid a naval blockade of eastern China amid the Second Sino-Japanese War. Time described the harbour as the "seventh busiest in the world... always alive with yachts, junks, ferries, sampans, freighters, liners, men-of-war." The Hong Kong Observatory (HKO) was established in 1883, and a year later, the agency began issuing public warnings of approaching typhoons using a gun. The system was replaced with bomb detonations, beginning in 1907. A decade later, the HKO introduced a numbered warning system to the public, with No. 1 as standby. The highest rating, No. 10, signified the potential for typhoon conditions, or maximum sustained winds of at least 118 km/h (74 mph).

== Meteorological history ==
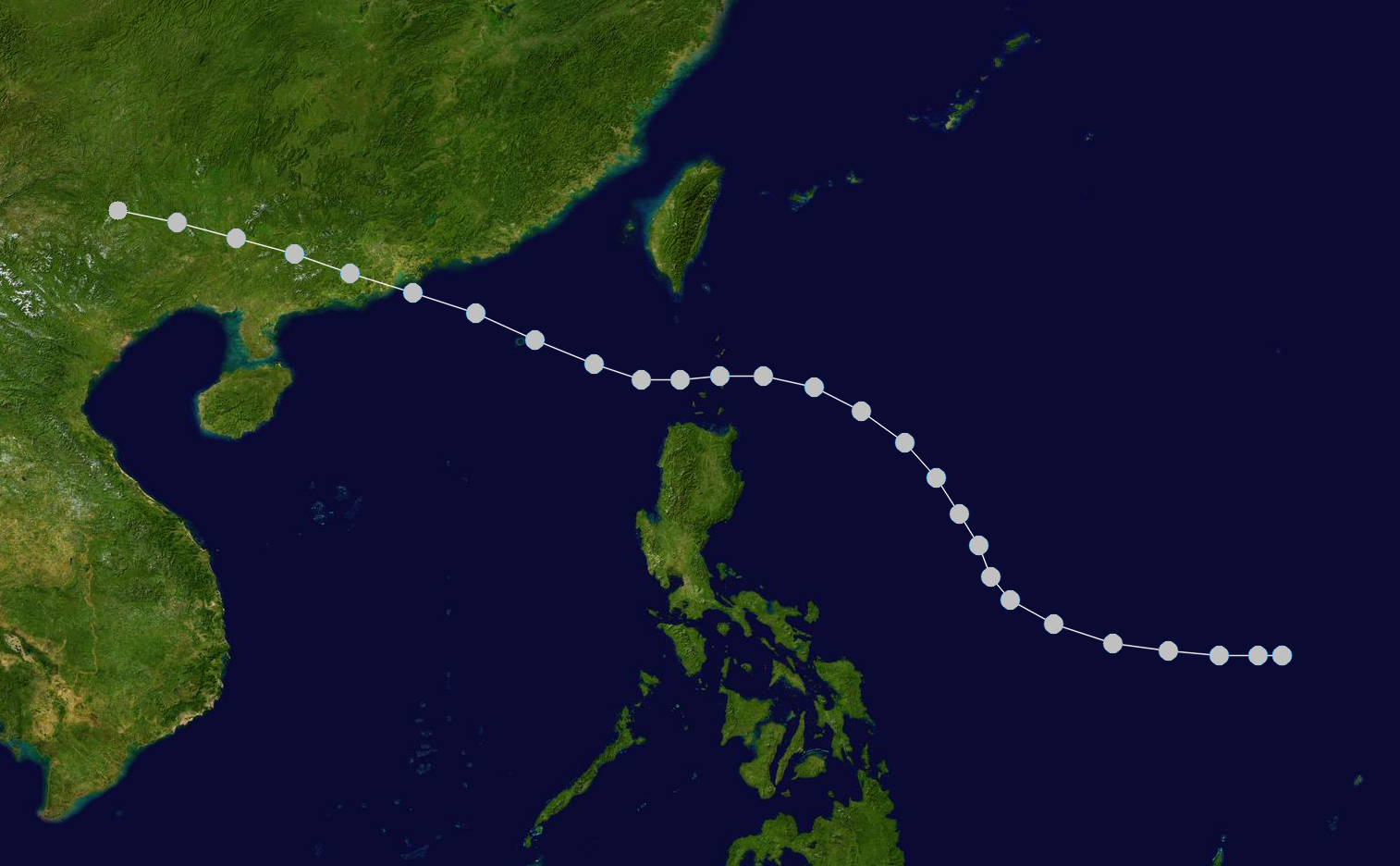
Map plotting the storm's track and intensity, according to the Saffir–Simpson scale Map key Saffir–Simpson scale Tropical depression (≤38 mph, ≤62 km/h) Tropical storm (39–73 mph, 63–118 km/h) Category 1 (74–95 mph, 119–153 km/h) Category 2 (96–110 mph, 154–177 km/h) Category 3 (111–129 mph, 178–208 km/h) Category 4 (130–156 mph, 209–251 km/h) Category 5 (≥157 mph, ≥252 km/h) Unknown Storm type Tropical cyclone Subtropical cyclone Extratropical cyclone, remnant low, tropical disturbance, or monsoon depression

The origins of the typhoon were from a storm located 320 km (200 mi) south of Guam on 24 August. The September 1937 issue of the Monthly Weather Review described that "there was little evidence of its potentialities", as the storm moved west-northwestward across the western Pacific Ocean. At 08:00 UTC on 28 August, (Note: Dates and times are listed in Coordinated Universal Time (UTC) unless otherwise stated. Hong Kong time is 8 full hours ahead of UTC.) the USS Ramapo encountered the storm, observing an barometric pressure of 1,003 mbar (29.61 in Hg), and sustained winds of 61 km/h (38 mph). These observations suggested that the storm passed just south of the ship, although the intensity of the system was unknown at that point. Around 30 August, the storm turned more to the northwest, causing it to remain north and east of majority of the Philippines. On 1 September, it went through the Balintang Channel, passing 48 km (30 mi) south of Basco, Batanes. A station there recorded a pressure of 986 mbar (29.102 in Hg), as well as a force 11 on the Beaufort scale, indicating a strengthening storm with winds of at least 105 km/h (65 mph). Thereafter, the typhoon entered the South China Sea, passing just north of Pratas Island, where a pressure of 993 mbar (29.327 in Hg) was recorded.

As the typhoon moved across the northern portion of the South China Sea toward the southern China, it intensified rapidly. On 2 September around 21:00 UTC (7:00 a.m. local time on 3 September) the typhoon made landfall just west of Hong Kong, after passing only 12 km (7 mi) south of the British colony. The lowest pressure recorded at the HKO was 958 mbar (28.298 in Hg), while at the harbour, the SS Shuntien observed a pressure of 953 mbar (28.15 in Hg). The typhoon's exact intensity was unknown, as its squalls of winds surpassed the capacity of the anemometer, which was greater than 201 km/h (125 mph). The observations suggested that the typhoon struck with winds equivalent to a Category 3 on the Saffir-Simpson scale, or sustained winds of at least 180 km/h (112 mph). The typhoon continued inland and weakened, dissipating over southern China on 3 September.

== Preparations and impacts ==
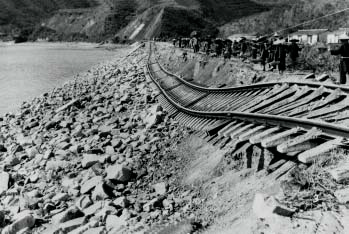
Damaged train tracks in Hong Kong

On 31 August at 16:35 UTC (12:35 AM on 1 September local time) the HKO issued warning signal No. 1, or standby. The following day, at 07:20 UTC (3:20 PM on 2 September local time) the warning signal was raised to No. 5, which meant that gale-force winds were expected for the territory. The issuance prompted larger vessels to leave the harbour and seek shelter in nearby bays. Fishermen and travelers left their ships for typhoon shelters. The HKO upgraded the warning further to No. 10, meaning that typhoon-force winds were expected, at 17:58 UTC on 1 September.(1:58 a.m. 2 September local time). Twelve minutes later, officials fired typhoon bombs to warn the public. This marked the last occasion that typhoon bombs were used. The No. 10 warning signal was issued overnight, and less than two hours before the typhoon made its closest approach. As a result, the typhoon's ferocity was largely unexpected.

As it moved ashore southern China, the typhoon produced a variety of damaging effects. Wind gusts were estimated to have reached at least 241 km/h (150 mph) in Hong Kong, although the anemometer was only able to record gusts as high as 201 km/h (125 mph). However, a private anemometer 3.2 km (2 mi) east of the HKO recorded a wind gust of 268 km/h (167 mph). The mean hourly wind average in the territory reached 109 km/h (68 mph). Along the coast, the powerful typhoon increased tides, with waves estimated at 9.1 m (30 ft) in Tolo Harbour. The high water mark at Tai Po was estimated at 6.25 m (20.5 ft), corresponding to a storm surge of 3.81 m (12.5 ft). Victoria Harbour experienced a storm surge of 1.98 m (6.5 ft). During its passage, the typhoon also dropped heavy rainfall, totaling 128.4 mm (5.055 in).

The typhoon killed thousands of people in Hong Kong, with a death toll between 11,000 and 13,000. This accounted for roughly 1% of the territory's population of 1 million. However, many of the bodies were washed away and never found, with roughly 500 corpses found in the days after the typhoon. Fishermen accounted for majority of the deceased, after the typhoon capsized 1,855 fishing boats, and the fishermen were unable to seek shelter. The destroyed boats included sampans, or houseboats, as well as 28 ships bound for the ocean. Other sailors were unaware of the approaching storm. High tides washed many boats ashore and broke other vessels from their moorings, including the Asama Maru, the Conte Verde, and the Van Heutsz. The steamer An Lee broke from its moorings and struck HMS Suffolk, causing 12 people to jump ship, one of whom missed and drowned. The An Lee later hit HMS Duchess. Twenty ships sent out SOS distress signals.

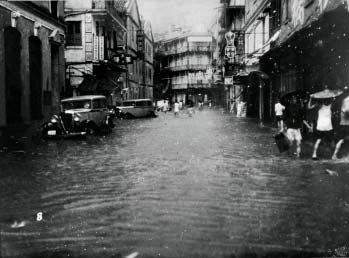
Floodwaters in Hong Kong

In mainland Hong Kong, the typhoon swept away an entire village in Tai Po Market, resulting in an estimated 300 fatalities. About half of Sha Tau Kok was wrecked, with 30 people killed there. Across Hong Kong, the storm damaged houses and factories while also resulting in power and telephone outages. The winds uprooted trees and knocked down branches. During the height of the storm, nine buildings caught fire and were destroyed, resulting in dozens of deaths, after the fire brigade faced difficulty reaching the area. The high winds tore through roofs, signs, and lampposts, littering the road with debris. The high tides washed away nearly a mile of the Kowloon–Canton Railway. British officials estimated the total damage at around HK$1 million (US$300,000).

Outside of Hong Kong, newspapers described the effects in nearby Macau as having "suffered severely", with 21 fatalities in the territory. In nearby Canton, there was a "less severe buffeting" according to newspapers.

== Aftermath ==
Police and other officials used rope to attempt to rescue people caught by the floods. At the harbour, tugs had to assist beached or stranded vessels, although it took six months for the Asama Maru to be moved. The storm occurred concurrently with a cholera outbreak in Hong Kong amid the stagnant floodwaters. To prevent a larger outbreak, officials set up 50 clinics for vaccinations. Emergency resources were strained due to the ongoing war and naval blockade, although British and American air shipments helped with the supply. Flooded or blocked roads and railroads disrupted transport, leaving people in Hong Kong stranded for several days. Damage at Kai Tak Airport delayed international flights.

In 1938 the HKO published a report assessing the costs of typhoon damage over the preceding ten years. The 1937 typhoon accounted for 39% of these costs, with the repairs reaching HK$585,734. (Note: Currency in 1937 Hong Kong dollars)

== See also ==
- 1906 Hong Kong typhoon
- 1908 Hong Kong typhoon
- Typhoon Ellen (1983) – one of the strongest typhoons to strike Hong Kong
