= HMS Ringdove (M77) =

Minelayer of the Royal Navy

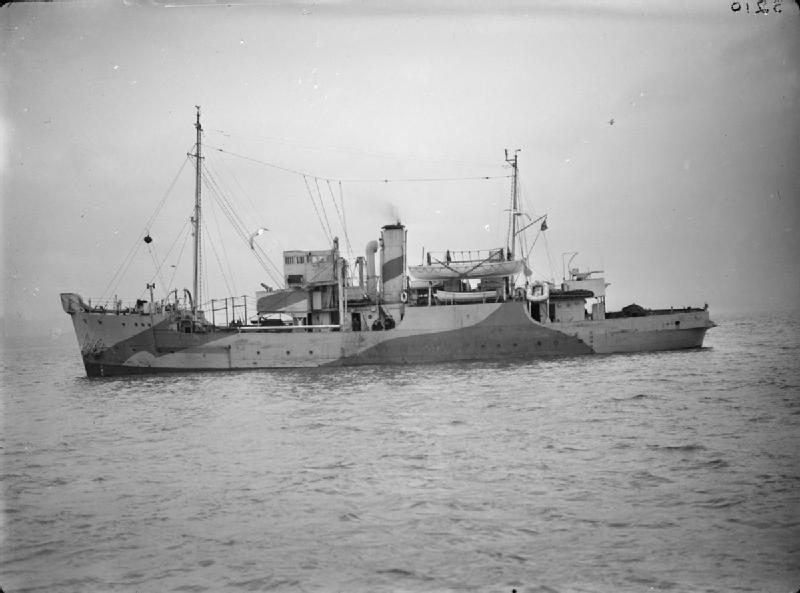
- HMS Ringdove in 1943

History

United Kingdom
- Name: HMS Ringdove
- Namesake: Common wood pigeon
- Ordered: 22 March 1937
- Builder: Henry Robb
- Laid down: September 1937
- Launched: 15 June 1938
- Commissioned: 9 December 1938
- Identification: Pennant number: M77
- Fate: Sold to Pakistan in 1951

General characteristics
- Type: Linnet-class minelayer
- Displacement: 498 tons standard
- Length: 145 ft 0 in (44.20 m) (p/p); 163 ft 9 in (49.91 m) (o/a)
- Beam: 27 ft 2 in (8.28 m)
- Draught: 8 ft 0 in (2.44 m)
- Propulsion: Triple expansion engine; 1 shaft; 400 hp (300 kW)
- Speed: 10.5 knots (19.4 km/h)
- Complement: 24
- Armament: 2 × twin 0.303 in machine guns; 1 × Oerlikon 20 mm cannon (from 1942); 12 mines

HMS Ringdove was one of three Royal Navy Linnet-class minelayers built in 1938. She saw service as a merchant escort during the Norwegian campaign of World War II and remained in service until she was sold to Pakistan in 1951 to serve as a pilot vessel.
