= SS Fatshan (1887) =

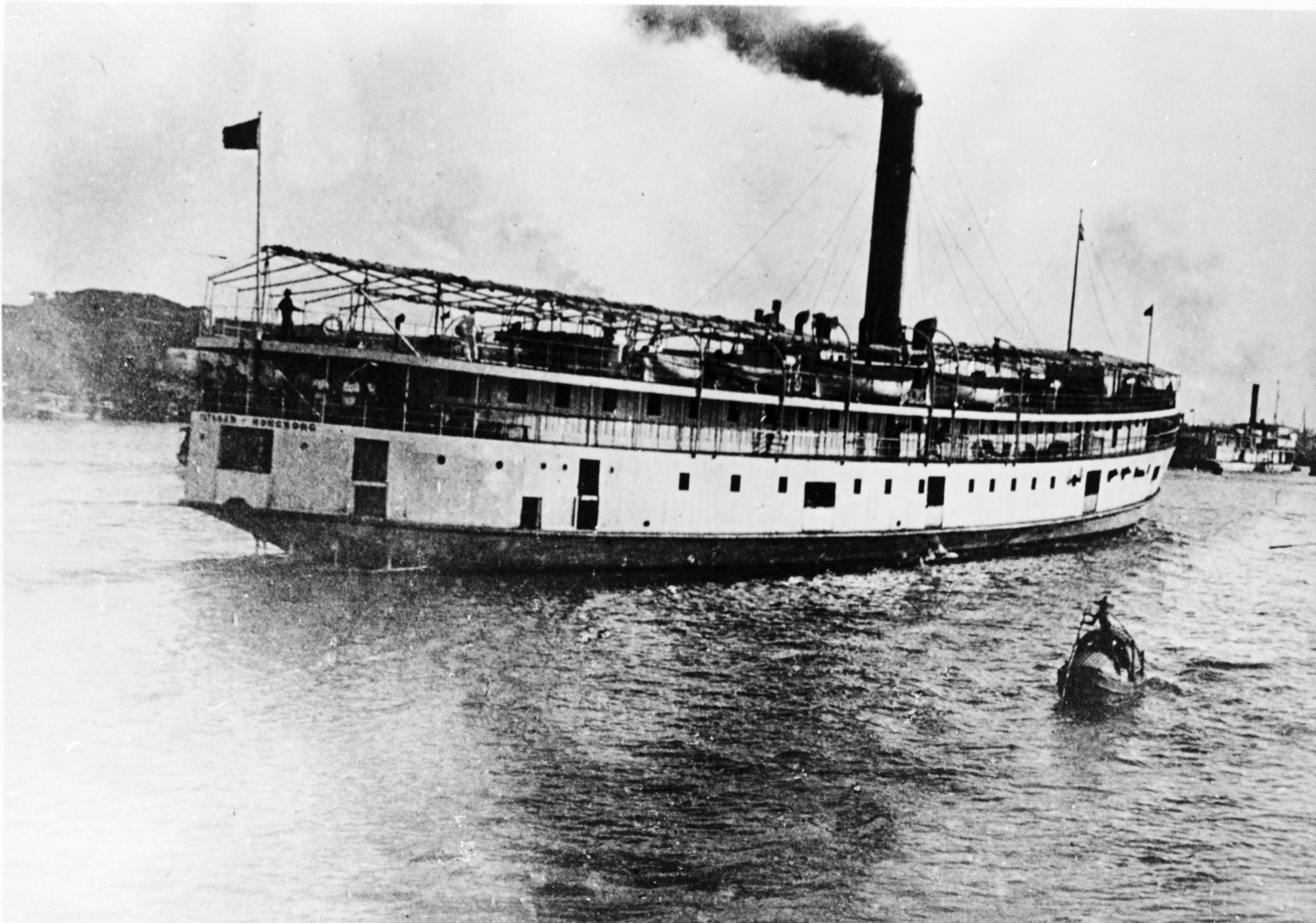
- SS Fatshan underway on the Pearl River

History

Hong Kong
- Name: Fatshan
- Namesake: City of Fatshan (now Foshan), Guangdong (Canton)
- Owner: 62.5% owned by Hong Kong, Canton & Macao Steamboat Company; 37.5% owned by China Navigation Company
- Builder: Ramage & Ferguson & Company, Leith
- Yard number: Victoria Shipyard 76
- Laid down: 1887
- Launched: 31 March 1887
- Sponsored by: Hong Kong, Canton & Macao Steamboat Company
- Commissioned: 1887
- Decommissioned: 1933
- Fate: Full ownership acquired by the China Navigation Company in 1906.

Hong Kong
- Name: Fatshan
- Operator: China Navigation Company
- Builder: Ramage & Ferguson & Company, Leith
- Acquired: 1906
- Commissioned: 1907
- Identification: ID / IMO No. 88843 / 1088843
- Fate: Scrapped in Q4, 1933

General characteristics (as Fatshan)
- Class & type: Steam powered ferry
- Tonnage: 2,260 GRT 1,425 NRT
- Length: 280 ft (85.3 m)
- Beam: 54 ft (16.5 m)
- Depth: 10.2 ft (3.1 m)
- Installed power: 225 nhp
- Propulsion: Triple expansion steam engines
- Speed: 13 knots (24 km/h; 15 mph)
- Capacity: Over 1,000 passengers
- Armament: light arms

SS Fatshan
- Traditional Chinese: 佛山輪
- Simplified Chinese: 佛山轮
Transcriptions
Standard Mandarin
- Hanyu Pinyin: Fóshānlún
Yue: Cantonese
- Jyutping: fat6 saan1 leon4

SS Fatshan (Chinese: 佛山輪) was a passenger ferry steamer operating on the Hong Kong-Canton Line between 1887 and 1933 when she was scrapped and replaced by her namesake, Fatshan (1933). Shortly before scrapping she was renamed Fatshan I.

== Construction and commissioning ==
Fatshan was commissioned by the HongKong, Canton & Macao Steamboat Company as a passenger steamer to service the Hong Kong to Canton route. She was built in Leith at the Victoria Shipyard by the Ramage & Ferguson & Company and was launched on 21 March 1887. The ship was measured at 2,260 gross register tons and initially was powered by two triple-expansion steam engines capable of producing 173 nhp driving twin screws

== Hong Kong Canton Line with the Hongkong Canton & Macao Steamboat Company ==
After her delivery, Fatshan commenced service with the Hongkong Canton & Macao Steamboat Company, the leading ferry company sailing in the area at the time. At the time of its introduction, Fatshan was well known in the China trade as one of the best passenger steamers sailing the Hong Kong to Canton.

The ship was divided between Chinese and European passengers and owing to the dangers faced by pirates, the ship was armed with small arms and a complement of guards.

== Hong Kong-Canton Line with the China Navigation Company ==
On 18 September 1906, a typhoon struck Hong Kong catching Fatshan in the eastern part of Victoria Harbour near the Taikoo Dockyard. The storm drove Fatshan and several other ships onto the shore of northern Hong Kong island. The ship was refloated by the end of the year.

During the evening of 27 July and into the morning of 28 July 1908 another severe Typhoon struck Hong Kong. During the storm three steam ships were approaching Hong Kong from Canton: SS Ying King of the Sing On Steamship Company, Fatshan and SS Kwong Sai. The three ships sought shelter, dropping anchor at The Brothers north of Lantau Island. Tragically, during the storm, a sudden squall struck the anchored ships and it was reported that after this squall Ying King foundered and disappeared from the view of the other two ships. The sinking resulted in the loss of 421 lives, with only 42 survivors recovered on 28 July by the Customs launch Kowloon Sai.

Later, on 29 November 1908, Fatshan was the subject of a political crisis that took place in Hong Kong and Canton Province after the apparent murder aboard the ship of a Chinese passenger, one Ho Yiu-tiu (also referred to as Ho Tsoi-yin), allegedly perpetrated by a Portuguese crewman. The incident occurred when the steamer was en route to Canton from Hong Kong. Eyewitnesses alleged that they had seen the Portuguese crew member, one Mr. Noronha, a ticket collector, kicking the Chinese passenger following a dispute. Upon arriving at Canton, an autopsy was performed on the deceased by the Canton Red Cross Society which found that the deceased had died from wounds caused by the incident. Soon after, an official inquest was called for. Given that the incident had occurred on board British property, the British Consulate at Canton asserted their right to jurisdiction in the matter. British inquiry also called for a separate autopsy to be performed by a British doctor, who found that the deceased had suffered from heart troubles and that the death was likely due to natural causes; the charge of homicide against Mr. Noronha was to be dropped. These events coincided with a series of incidents of civil unrest ongoing at the time. Coincidentally, the incident caught the attention of the Self-Government Society who called for a boycott of Fatshan and its parent company and also for civic uprising in Canton and Hong Kong. The boycott was successful and eventually led to a private settlement with the Self-Government Society.

== See also ==
- China Navigation Company
