= USS Linnet (AMS-24) =

Minesweeper of the United States Navy

History

United States
- Name: USS YMS-395
- Builder: Harbor Boat Building; Terminal Island, California
- Laid down: 11 July 1942
- Launched: 15 July 1943
- Commissioned: 20 November 1943
- Renamed: USS Linnet (AMS-24), 18 February 1947
- Namesake: the linnet bird
- Reclassified: MSC(O)-24, 7 February 1955
- Decommissioned: 13 September 1957
- In service: 30 October 1959, Naval Reserve training ship
- Out of service: 3 September 1968
- Stricken: 1 October 1968
- Fate: Sold; ultimate fate unknown

General characteristics
- Class & type: YMS-135 subclass of YMS-1-class minesweepers
- Displacement: 270 t
- Length: 136 ft (41 m)
- Beam: 24 ft 6 in (7.47 m)
- Draft: 8 ft (2.4 m)
- Propulsion: 2 × 880 bhp General Motors 8-268A diesel engines; 2 shafts
- Speed: 15 knots (28 km/h)
- Complement: 32
- Armament: 1 × 3"/50 caliber gun mount; 2 × 20 mm guns; 2 × depth charge projectors

USS Linnet (AMS-24/YMS-395) was a YMS-1-class minesweeper of the YMS-135 subclass built for the United States Navy during World War II.

Linnet was laid down on 11 July 1942 by Harbor Boat Building of Terminal Island, California, launched on 15 July 1943, and completed 19 November 1943. She was commissioned USS YMS-395 on 20 November 1943.

After shakedown off San Pedro, California, she continued ASW patrols off the California coast until 7 March 1944, when she sailed for Pearl Harbor. The minesweeper then sailed for the Marshall Islands arriving Majuro 18 April. For the next 16 months YMS-395 engaged in patrol operations, convoy escort duty, and minesweeper services in the Marshall and Gilbert Islands. Together with similar ships of her type, she played an important role in defeat of Japan by keeping the staging harbors clear of enemy mines,

After the Japanese surrender, YMS-395 departed Guam 14 September 1945, touching several islands before arriving San Pedro, California, 26 October. She remained on the West Coast until May 1946 performing experimental minesweeping tests and after arriving Charleston, South Carolina, on 13 June she continued similar exercises alone the East Coast.

YMS-395 was renamed USS Linnet (AMS-24) on 18 February 1947, and later that month was assigned to the Mine Warfare School, Yorktown, Virginia. From 1947 until 1957 Linnet operated along the west coast and performed experiments and exercises in all phases of mine warfare. She was reclassified MSC(O)-24 on 7 February 1955 and decommissioned at Philadelphia, Pennsylvania, 13 September 1957.

Linnet was placed in service as a U.S. Naval Reserve training ship 30 October 1959, and was assigned to the 4th Naval District for duty at Atlantic City, New Jersey. She continued in this service until 3 September 1968, when she was relieved by Meadowlark.

Struck from the Naval Vessel Register on 1 October 1968 and sold sometime after, the veteran minesweeper's ultimate fate is unknown.

Actually, my father, John Bell Clayton III, bought it from the Navy via a surplus sale for a couple thousand dollars, bribing the selling officer to not enforce the removal of the two diesel engines that was a condition of the sale. I was 16 at the time and helped him sail it from the Philadelphia Naval Shipyard to NYC, where it was docked at the Brooklyn Kings Mall wharf for a year while we removed the military gear and sold the minesweep cable and the diesel generator. That diesel was the same as the propulsion diesels. I was 16 at the time. He then sailed it to Maine where he had a refrigerated hold installed in the minesweep cable area. He sailed it down to Key West and leased it to a lobster fishing operation that had strings of pots along the Yucatán off-shore Mexico area. After a few years he sold it to them. They loaded it up with spoiled chicken and sank it in the Gulf Stream for the insurance.
