= USS Linnet =

USS Linnet may refer to the following ships of the United States Navy:

- USS Linnet (1814), which was a British brig that the U.S. Navy captured on 11 September 1814 and sold in 1825
- USS Linnet (AM-76), was acquired by the US Navy 4 September 1940 and was decommissioned 18 December 1944
- USS Linnet (AM-417), contract for construction canceled 12 August 1945
- USS Linnet (AMS-24), was launched as YMS-395 15 July 1943, renamed Linnet (AMS-24) on 18 February 1947 and struck from the Navy list 1 October 1968
