= HMS Redstart (M62) =

Minelayer of the Royal Navy

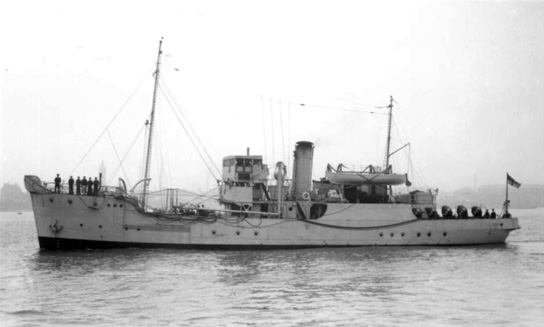
- HMS Redstart

History

United Kingdom
- Name: HMS Redstart
- Namesake: Common redstart
- Ordered: 22 March 1937
- Builder: Henry Robb
- Laid down: September 1937
- Launched: 3 May 1938
- Commissioned: 1 November 1938
- Identification: Pennant number M62
- Fate: Scuttled in Hong Kong on 19 December 1941

General characteristics
- Type: Linnet-class minelayer
- Displacement: 498 tons standard
- Length: 145 ft 0 in (44.20 m) (p/p); 163 ft 9 in (49.91 m) (o/a)
- Beam: 27 ft 2 in (8.28 m)
- Draught: 8 ft 0 in (2.44 m)
- Propulsion: Triple expansion engine; 1 shaft; 400 hp (300 kW)
- Speed: 10.5 knots (19.4 km/h)
- Complement: 24
- Armament: 2 × twin 0.303 in machine guns; 1 × Oerlikon 20 mm cannon (from 1942); 12 mines

HMS Redstart was one of three Royal Navy Linnet-class minelayers built in 1938. Assigned to the Royal Navy's China Station at the outbreak of World War II, she was scuttled during the Battle of Hong Kong on 19 December 1941 to prevent capture by the invading Japanese. Following the scuttling, its commander, Lt Cdr Henry Charles Sylvester Collingwood-Selby, participated in the defence of the colony where he was later wounded and captured, spending the rest of the war as a POW.
