= 1908 Hong Kong typhoon =

Pacific typhoon in 1908

Meteorological history
- Formed: 25 July 1908
- Dissipated: 28 July 1908

Overall effects
- Fatalities: >1,000
- Areas affected: British Hong Kong
- Part of the 1908 Pacific typhoon season

The 1908 Hong Kong Typhoon was a tropical cyclone which made landfall near Hong Kong on the night of 27 July 1908. The ‌‌storm resulted in significant property damage and loss of life. The most notable occurrence of the event was the loss of the SS Ying King (英京號), a steamship, which sank while trying to seek shelter from the storm; 421 people on board drowned. About one thousand people were reported to have drowned, more than 20 houses collapsed, and many Hong Kong wharf facilities were damaged. As a result of the catastrophe, additional safety measures were undertaken, including the construction of a second typhoon shelter in Hong Kong harbour.

== Newspaper reports ==
At 8:30 pm on the evening of 27 July 1908 (Monday), there was a night signal of Green-Red-Green at the Tamar naval base to indicate a possible typhoon approaching less than 300 miles from the Colony.

At 9:30 pm the Hong Kong Observatory reported that the typhoon seemed to be moving in the direction of the Hong Kong coast. Ships anchoring in the harbour took the usual safety precautions, as small native vessels swarmed to the typhoon shelter at Causeway Bay. The weather signals continued to escalate after that.

The rain started falling and at 11:15 pm the Observatory was ordered to fire an urgent alarm of three explosive rockets at 10-second intervals, and the night alarm signal on the Tamar changed to Red-Green-Red signalling the risk of hurricane-force winds expected at any moment to strike Hong Kong, equivalent to the hurricane signal number 10 in modern-day Hong Kong SAR.

The typhoon reached its peak strength after midnight. The typhoon blew over trees, felled chimneys, cracked walls, and caused substantial damage to property. For four hours, streets were difficult if not impossible to use, owing to many falling and blown objects such as hanging signboards, roof tiles, window glass, and debris of all sorts. Strong winds kept blowing until 6:00 am on the next morning (28 July).

In the morning light, it became clear that many if not nearly all properties in the Colony would need some repair. Many parallel blinds and shutters had been stripped from windows, glass was broken, roof tiles had been blown away, and walls were stripped of plaster.

The July 1908 Typhoon was frequently compared to the typhoon in September 1906. It is said that the two typhoons were similar in terms of magnitude, movement directions as well as strength. On shore, the July 1908 Typhoon caused more damage and more deaths, although in the harbour the number of deaths were less severe, due to an advanced warning alert from the Hong Kong Observatory. The availability of the typhoon shelters for evacuation further reduced the fatality numbers of the typhoon. Additionally, the movement of the July 1908 Typhoon did actually play a part in reducing the number of casualties; it came from the northeast and not from the northwest, unlike the September 1906 Typhoon.

== Hong Kong Government report ==
There was a summary report by the Hong Kong Government dated 17 September 1908 presented to Governor Frederick Lugard, and laid before the Legislative Council of Hong Kong. Information from this report stated that no less than seven hundred people were drowned in the harbour during the July 1908 typhoon and more than one hundred native vessels were sunk.

A summary of loss:

- Government property loss was estimated at HK$100,000. Private loss not yet estimated.
- 26 privately owned buildings collapsed, with a loss of 59 lives.
- 179 native boat craft had been sunk, wrecked or damaged during the typhoon, with 271 persons missing.
- The death toll from the sinking of the Ying King steamer during the typhoon was 421 persons (one European officer and 41 Chinese crew and passengers were saved).
- Damage and casualties among the European craft (excluding Ying King) were 17 sank, 23 went ashore, 26 damaged and 5 persons missing.
- Damage to the trees, shrubs and plants in Hong Kong was severe, and said to be no less than that caused by the 1906 Typhoon.
- The anemometer (used to measure wind speed) on Hong Kong Island was completely wrecked and that at the Observatory much damaged; as a result, it was not possible to have a precise comparison of the wind speed between the September 1906 Typhoon and July 1908 Typhoon.
- According to the Hong Kong Government, there was a surplus of relief funds available after the 1906 Typhoon; therefore no need to raise extra funds to aid the sufferers in the 1908 typhoon situation.

== Maritime damage and loss ==
=== Loss of the SS Ying King ===
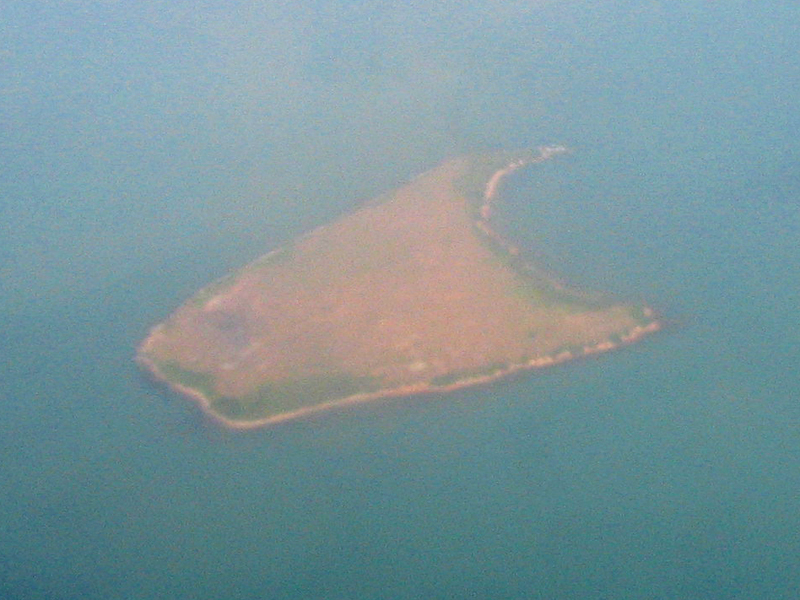
Tai Mo To, one of The Brothers islands (大小磨刀洲)

The SS Ying King (英京號) was a Hong Kong-based passenger steamer of 768 tons, built in 1903. Her owner was the Sing On Steamship Company. The steamer departed from Canton at 6:00 pm on the evening of 27 July, heading towards Hong Kong with 33 crew members and 430 passengers. The Ying King was one of three steamers coming from Canton, and as the wind was gaining force, was making her way to anchor and shelter in the lee of The Brothers (大小磨刀洲) with the intent to weather the storm north of Lantau Island. Eventually the Ying King foundered and only 42 people survived.

The SS Fatshan was said to be second to arrive at The Brothers, and the third steamer, SS Kwong Sai soon followed. Capt. Crowe from the Kwong Sai reported that shortly after his steamer dropped anchor, there was a sudden and fierce strong wind squall, and the Ying King was said to be gone and disappeared after that.

Subsequently, there was a rescue effort from Hong Kong on 28 July at about 9:30 pm regarding a party of 42 survivors from the Ying King. They were rescued at Pillar Point and the Castle Peak by the customs cruising launch Kowloon Sai. Captain Hewett from the Kowloon Sai said that he heard a gun fired, and saw people waving. He had the launch head towards the shore, and found the people to be the survivors from the Ying King. The survivors consisted of Mr Ferguson (the chief mate), an Indian watchman, two quartermasters, a tallyman, three firemen, one sailor, and 33 Chinese passengers. Mr Ferguson reported that Ying King was a total wreck, and nothing was known about the fate of the other ship officers, including Capt. Page, Mr Fotheringham and Mr Newman.

The report from the survivors was that the Ying King had sunk in the early morning of 28 July. The report was that the Ying King developed a leak, and while the pumps were working they failed to pump out enough water. The steamer continued to list more and at about 2:50 am she foundered. Witness reported that they could not provide enough lifebelts to the passengers, as more lifebelts were stowed on the lowest decks of the steamer. Just before Ying King went down, Captain Page gave the word, every man for himself. From what was gathered from the survivors, there was chaos and confusion. Two lifeboats were lowered, but no one was able to get in them.

As the Ying King was sinking, Mr Fergusson, the chief mate, remained on board until she had almost sunk. Then he joined eight crew members and 33 passengers to get ashore close to Castle Peak Farm. The survivors were floating with the aid of wreckage and lifebuoys, and they reported that all the others were likely lost. When last seen Captain Page had a lifebelt on, and was entering the water.

Eventually, the police recovered the dead body of a European off Castle Peak on 31 July, which was washed up presumably from the wreck of the Ying King, but no one was able to recognise him. The following morning four fishermen were charged before the local magistracy for stealing a gold watch and chain from the dead body of a European. Detective Sgt. Terrett, who was in Court recognised the stolen items as belonging to Capt. Page, who had purchased them at Messrs. Ullman's, in Queen's Road Central. A cigar cutter attached to the chain, was another source of his identification.

The Court found that the Ying King was lost through the typhoon, and that all reasonable precautions had been taken. Captain Page, an Australian, and together with three European passengers were all drowned. Captain Page's wife had sailed for Sydney with their little child three months earlier.

=== The SS Eastern and other steamers ===
Capt. McArthur, of the SS Eastern, after his 1908 Hong Kong typhoon saga, stated that every one had experienced the very strong force of the wind. At the height of the typhoon, the Eastern was resting at anchor, and the crew had to crawl on their hands and knees to the bow of the vessel, apparently no one could stand up against the powerful wind. There was a second buoy beside her. The steamer Chihli was also seen having difficulties. The Eastern was lucky to go through the challenging ordeal without much damage, even though at one point of time, it risked being hit by another drifting vessel.

The Juteopolis sailing vessel had two of her masts blown overboard and the top gallant mast was hanging over the stern. On the southern part of Stonecutters Island, the Pocahontas and Lai-Sang were ashore, and on the eastern side of the Island the Schuylkill had grounded. Quite a few vessels were also blown ashore, including the seagoing steamer Aeolus. Also a river steamer Sunon sank at the wharf.

The steamer Asia was listing, and the Persia was ashore near Hung Hom Bay, lying on a mud shoal. The Tai Wan steamer was damaged by a collision with the Aeolus. Also the steamer Neil McLeod was reported to have crashed into the Tai Wan steamer and her sixteen crew members went on board the Tai Wan before the Neil McLeod drifted away, and eventually went ashore at Capsuimun.

The Katherine Park, a British steamer, broke away from Kowloon Bay and drifted off North Point, and her anchors got entangled with the telegraph cables which held her until the storm had ceased. At Kowloon Docks eleven launches and three junks had foundered, and a few lighters belonging to the Cement Works had also gone to the bottom. The torpedo boat destroyer Whiting was ashore at Lyemun, but was able to be refloated after the storm.

The low wall at Arsenal Street was nearly washed away, and 14 cargo boats and sampans that did not get to the Causeway Bay Typhoon Shelter, were smashed on the Praya promenade wall. A number of police and civilians were present at the time, and through their joint efforts, were able to save fifty people from this cargo fleet.

At the Tung Tai Tseung Kee shipyard (a local firm of engineers and shipbuilders), a small steamer under construction was smashed against the Praya wall and badly damaged. It was first lifted bodily onto the Praya promenade, but later carried back into the water again by the terrific waves.

The Naval Yard was fully loaded and filled with police and marine launches. There was an accident when Police Sergeant Boole entered the Naval Yard with his No. 1 police launch. The shelter space was not sufficient, in consequence of which much damage was done upon his entry. A sudden lurch to port sent the police sergeant and his crew overboard, and they had to swim for their lives and they all made it to land safely.

There were 70 native craft wrecked when they could not get to the shelter in time. Seven steam launches sank, and seven were blown onto shore. Ten cargo lighters sank, several went aground, and seven were damaged before the typhoon went on to Canton, where massive destruction was also caused.

== Heroes of the storm, the "Gallant Bluejackets" ==
Among the many heroic actions reported, a crew member of HMS Astraea noticed a nearby junk in peril at about 11:40 pm, and after a quick consultation a cutter was promptly lowered with twelve rowers and a steersman, under Torpedo Officer McLaughlin. When the battleship kept its searchlight going in the dark and with an effort of about twenty minutes they succeeded in reaching the junk in distress. Their further efforts to rescue the six Chinese boatmen there were done with success. But the remaining task to come back to shore was a difficult one, and a continuous effort of 45 minutes was required to take them back to the pier.

Upon their approach to Douglas Pier a rope was thrown to them, and the rescued boatmen and the crew were hauled safely ashore – however a small Chinese boy who lay unconscious at the bottom of the cutter had been left behind. When the young lad was discovered to be missing a bluejacket determined to return to the cutter and rescue him. Right after both were safely on shore, the cutter crashed into the pier and sank. All the rescued and rescuers were then brought to St George's Club after 1:15 am where everything possible was provided for their comfort.

== Property damage ==
The property damage in the City was not generally not large in individual cases, yet the aggregate would be very extensive and the total loss was viewed as very considerable. In the week of 18–25 July, Hong Kong posted a record of 16.2 inches rainfall. The continued wet weather in July 1908 being combined with the fury of a storm, was possibly responsible for some building collapses in the Colony.

The greatest damage to property was done at Kingsclere private hotel, where a portion of the beautiful building was in ruins. A tall chimney fell with an alarming noise at Kingsclere, in Kennedy Road, carrying with it all the roof over three rooms on the top floor and part of the walls. The resident of the room, Mr Hunt, of Messrs. Shewan, Tomes, and Company, who was in the Colony for about three months, apparently rose from the bed to look out, but hearing the big noise overhead. He reckoned that something was wrong and immediately sought refuge under the bed. Then the crash came. The debris fell on the bed and filled the room, but the bed legs withstood the strain and gave Mr Hunt a chance to breathe. But the weight on his body and legs was great, and he suffered in pain. A rescue team was early on the scene under the command of Police Chief Inspector Baker, and it took the fire brigade no less than four hours to rescue Mr Hunt. They worked with no little danger by reason of the unsupported wall which risked falling at any time. They rescued the unfortunate young man and sent him to the Government Civil Hospital to treat his internal injuries.

Another serious collapse was at the offices of the King's Buildings after a chimney broke in the roof and forced its way through four floors. The place was completely wrecked, but fortunately there was no loss of life. The upper floor, occupied by Messrs. Jebsen and Company, collapsed, and the whole floor fell through into Meyer and Company's office, the accumulation descending into the lower floor office of the Pacific Mail Steamship Company.

Queen's College also had its roof of the assembly hall partly carried away, with their center wooden beams being thrown away like matches. The roof of their north-west classrooms were severely damaged.

In addition to the accident which happened to Mr Hunt at Kingsclere, there were numerous instances of injuries to people during the storm. One of the firemen proceeding to Kingsclere rescue had a narrow escape, nearly hit by a branch of a tree falling on his head, only with his helmet saving him from serious head injury. Police Sgt. Clark was injured by a falling door and Police Sgt. Devney hurt his hand and foot by falling. Mr F. Wills, chief engineer of the SS Barra fell off a wharf at Kennedytown and received back injuries, and being treated in the Government Civil Hospital.

== Weather reports from ships received by wireless telegraphy ==
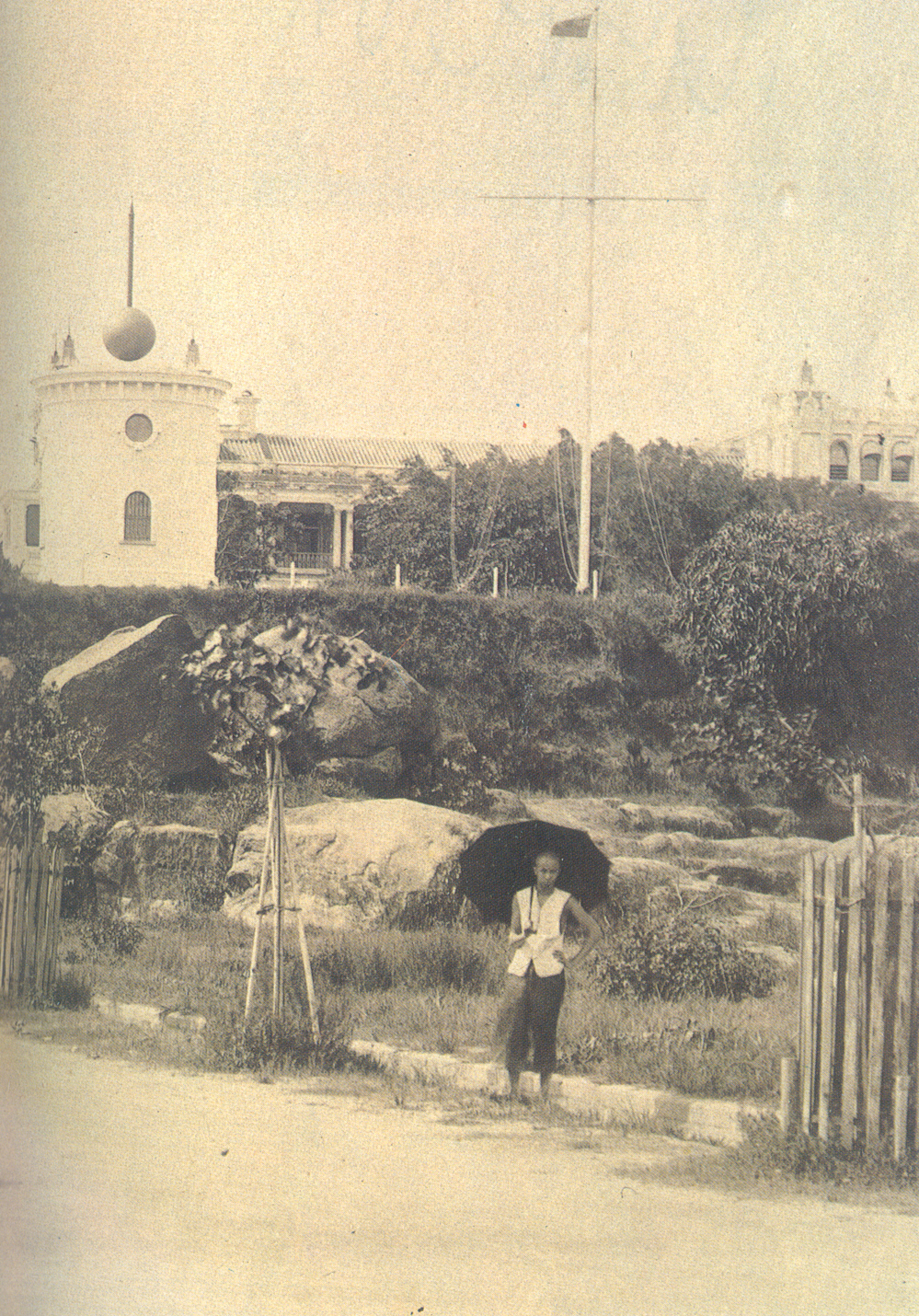
Timeballs near Tsim Sha Tsui Marine Police Headquarters Compound, 1908

The new time-ball tower on Signal Hill (also known as Blackhead Point) had been set up in 1908 at Tsim Sha Tsui to replace the previous time-ball tower at the Marine Police Station at Tsim Sha Tsui. In 1908, there was an introduction and wider use of wireless signals on radio broadcasting for Hong Kong vessel weather reports.

== Tax imposed on Hong Kong shipping for a second typhoon shelter ==
Hong Kong sources stated that the government proposed in the Legislative Council meeting on 6 August 1908 to impose on all river steamers a tax of five-sixths of a cent, per ton register, and two cents per registered tonnage on all other ships (excluding British and other warships) entering the Hong Kong waters to contribute to a construction fund for this second typhoon shelter.

Upon the recommendation of the Typhoon Refuge Committee (including the six shipping representatives from the P&O Company; Jardine, Matheson & Co.; Butterfield and Swire, Gibb, Livingston & Co.; David Sassoon & Co.; and Shewan, Tomes & Co.) who recorded their opinion that this new typhoon refuge was necessary and that it should be constructed at Mongkoktsui (Yau Ma Tei), in case the craft from the west could not get to Causeway Bay shelter in time of a strong gale.

According to the report, the number of vessels counted outside the Causeway Bay shelter on the morning of 28 July, included 98 junks, 38 European lighters in Kowloon Bay, Hung Hom Bay, off Yaumati and behind Stonecutters, and 200 sampans were also counted off Yaumati. There were also 112 native craft and four European lighters in Chinwan Bay. The report concluded that had there been a second typhoon shelter at Mongkoktsui, all these 452 vessels as well as a large number of sampans could have found safe refuge there.

Apparently, some shipping firms staged strong protest against this proposed tax. The aggregate tonnage of British shipping in Hong Kong in 1907 was about 6 million tons, and those of foreign ships were about 5.5 million tons. The proposed construction cost of the second typhoon shelter was HK$1.5 million. However, the Hong Kong Legislative Council eventually approved the construction of the second typhoon shelter in Mongkoktsui in 1909.
