= The Brothers (islands), Hong Kong =

Two islands in Hong Kong

Coordinates: 22°19′52″N 113°58′01″E

Map showing The Brothers.

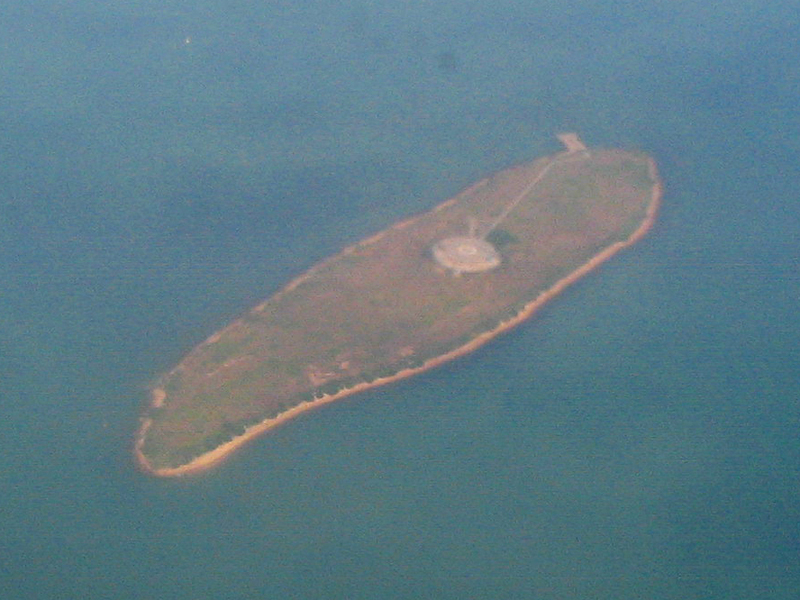
Siu Mo To, with the VOR/DME station visible.

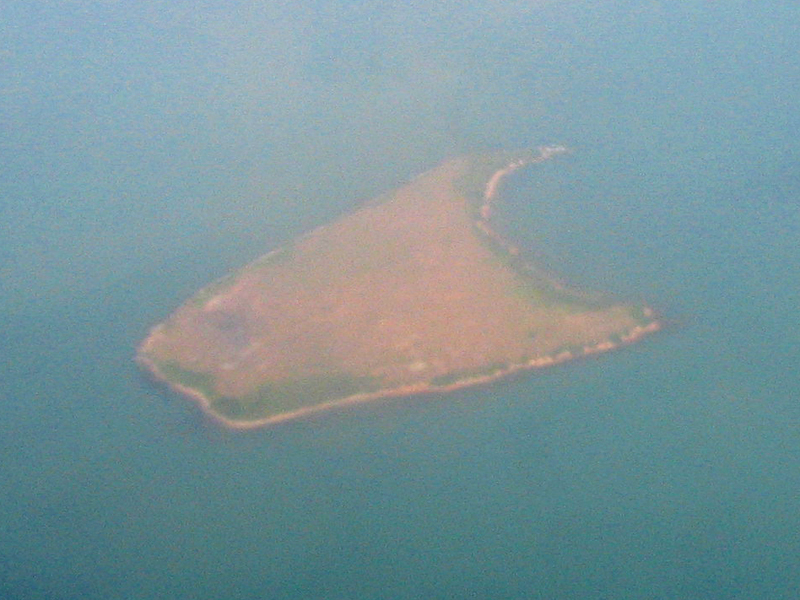
Tai Mo To

The Brothers or Mo To Chau (Chinese: 磨刀洲, or 大小磨刀洲) consist of two islands in Hong Kong, Siu Mo To (or East Brother, 小磨刀洲) and Tai Mo To (or West Brother, 大磨刀洲). The two islands have been leveled to avoid affecting aviation of the nearby Hong Kong International Airport. Administratively, they are under the jurisdiction of Tuen Mun District.

== Geography ==
The group of islands lie in the north of Lantau Island, midway between Chek Lap Kok, where Hong Kong International Airport is located, and Tuen Mun. West Brother and East Brother are 550 m by 430 m and 800 m by 180 m respectively. Before being leveled, they had maximum elevations of 68 m and 63 m. Tsz Kan Chau (or Reef Island, 匙羮洲), a tiny island nearby, is often regarded as a member of the group.

== History ==
Graphite was mined at West Brother Island between 1952 and 1971. By 1964, the mine workings had reached 90 m below sea level.

The two islands were leveled to avoid affecting aviation of the airport. The extracted material was used in the land reclamation of the airport platform. Environmentalists complained that it damaged the habitat of the Chinese white dolphins.

== Features ==
A VOR/DME station is located on Siu Mo To.

== Conservation ==
The Brothers Marine Park was designated as a marine park in December 2016. It encompasses the Brothers islands. The stated aim of the marine park is to help conserve the Chinese white dolphins, their habitats and enhance the marine and fisheries resources therein.

== See also ==
- 1908 Hong Kong typhoon
- Urmston Road
- Mining in Hong Kong
