= 1874 Hong Kong typhoon =

Pacific typhoon in 1874

Meteorological history
- Formed: September 22, 1874
- Dissipated: September 23, 1874

Typhoon
- Lowest pressure: 950 hPa (mbar); 28.05 inHg

Overall effects
- Fatalities: At least 17,000
- Areas affected: Qing China, British Hong Kong, Portuguese Macau
- Part of the 1874 Pacific typhoon season

The 1874 Hong Kong typhoon was the third-worst typhoon to ever hit Hong Kong, striking during the night of September 22, 1874 and the morning of September 23, 1874.

== Meteorological history ==
The Colony experienced a period of low pressure, typical of the eye of a typhoon. From 08:00 PM, winds raged and howled with ear-deafening sounds, alongside the painful cries of many people who had become homeless. The typhoon increased in strength steadily up to 02:15 AM on September 23. Modern analysis in 2017 indicated that this great typhoon passed approximately 50 to 60 km to the south of Hong Kong at its closest approach, similar to Hato in 2017. The typhoon began weakening after 03:00 AM.

Data taken from the ship Ava on the 22nd and 23rd of September, 1874, in Hong Kong harbor
Local time	Barometer	Thermometer	Wind direction	Wind strength	Metereological conditions
Midday	755	32°C	—	—	Cloudy
5 PM	750	30°C	N. N. W.	Strong winds	Dark clouds
6:30 PM	748	28°C	»	Cold breeze	Thick clouds
7:30 PM	748	»	N. 1/4 N. W.	Cold breeze; intermittent winds	Light rain
8 PM	747	»	»	Frequent gusts of wind	—
9 PM	746	»	E	Strong winds blowing	Very cold
10 PM	744	»	»	Stronger gusts of wind	Heavy rain
11 PM	742	»	»	Even stronger gusts of wind	—
11:30 PM	740	»	»	—	—
Midnight	735	»	»	—	—
12:30 AM	733	»	N. N. E.	Strong winds blowing	Harsh cold
1 AM	730	27°C	N. E.	Raging winds	Incessant rain
1:12 AM	728	»	»	Stormy	—
1:30 AM	727	»	E. N. E.	Stormy	—
2 AM	726	26°C	»	—	—
2:08 AM	728	»	E	Strong winds blowing	Very cold
3 AM	731	»	E. S. E.	—	—
3 AM, a few minutes later	735	»	S. E.	More frequent gusts of wind	Cold
8 AM	753	»	—	Gentle breeze	Clear skies

== Impact ==
=== China ===
In Kwangtung province, at least 10,000 people died in the storm, with some reporting up to 100,000.

=== Hong Kong ===
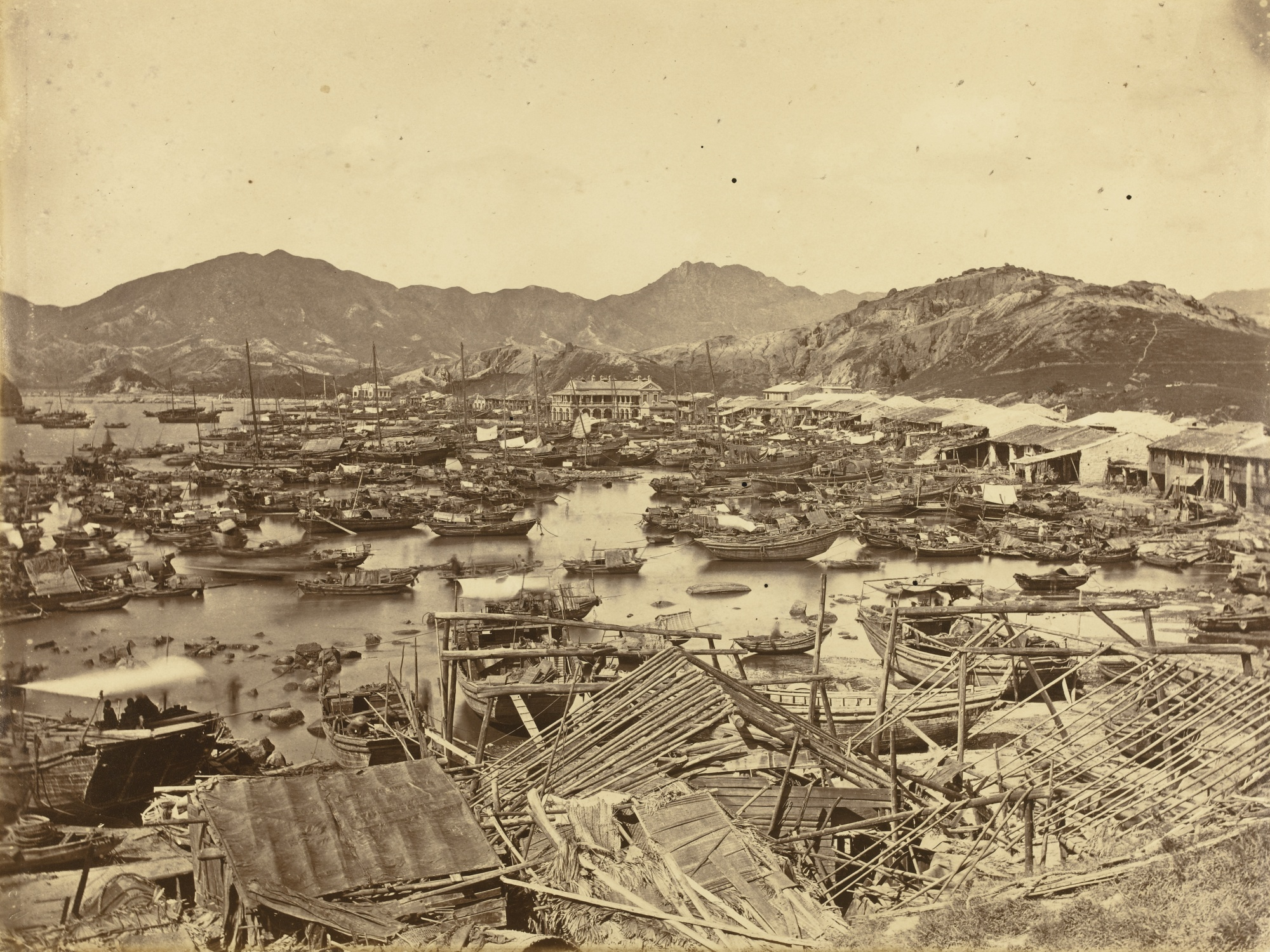
Aftermath of the typhoon in Yau Ma Tei. Photo by Lai Afong.

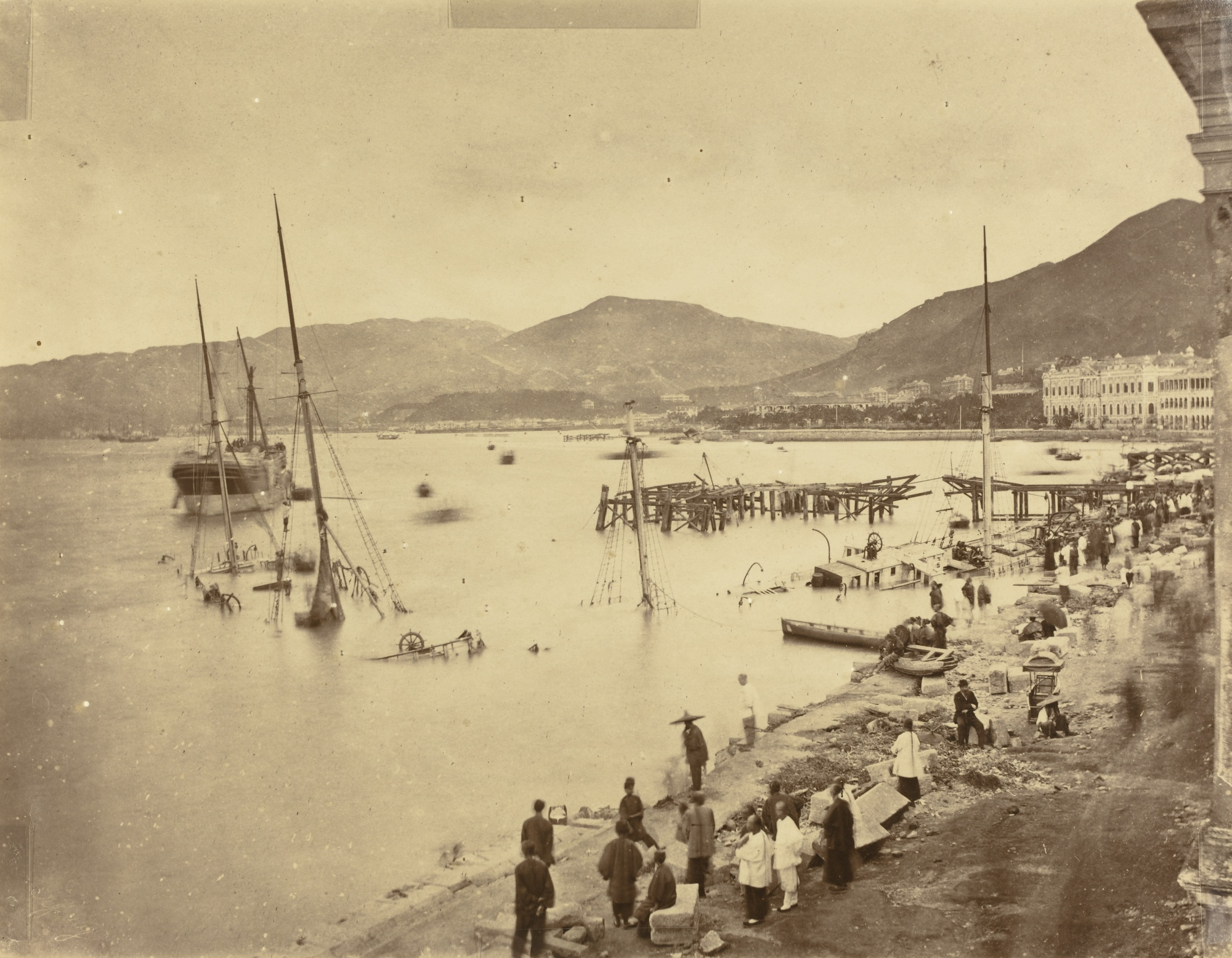
Aftermath of the typhoon. Photo by Lai Afong.

The typhoon hit Hong Kong with "unprecedented violence" and killed at least 2,000 people.

Some adventurers went out to the Praya at 11:00 PM and found themselves knee deep in the water and risked being washed away by the waves hitting the shore. They were forced to retreat by 01:00 AM as the winds were reaching a new high. The East Point on Causeway Bay recorded a water level 4 feet above its average. Many stores and shops, even far away from the Praya waterfront were flooded and water damaged.

The storm's two-hour impact had injured and killed many in the Colony. Telegraphic communication was interrupted and communication with Hong Kong Island was cut for a time. The town had sustained great loss, its roads were deserted and strewn with debris, house roofs were ruined, windows shattered and walls fallen and cables and gas pipes were blown away and trees uprooted.

=== Macau ===
The small Portuguese colony received extreme damage from the typhoon. The barometer reported the pressure of 28 inHg (950 hPa). The damaged steamer Poyang arrived in Hong Kong, reporting that the city was destroyed. Buildings around Praia Grande were destroyed, leaving the coast with sand. The streets and houses in the colony were annihilated. Fortaleza do Monte was damaged, with a torn off roof and collapsed walls. St. Joseph's Seminary and Church was nearly destroyed, with two walls remaining. 300,000 patacas worth of goods were destroyed in the storm, tea and olive oil being the costliest. It was estimated that over 5,000 people have died in Macau, and damages costs around 400,000 patacas. Around 2,000 ships were also sunk during the storm. The damage in the colony were reportedly worse than Paris during Franco-Prussian War, or the recent earthquake in the Philippines. It was considered the worst storm to hit Macau in history.

== Aftermath ==
Most of the 37 ships in port were damaged and hundreds of fishing junks and sampans were either wrecked or broken up despite having sought shelter in the bay. At this time Hong Kong did not have its own weather observatory and many people were expecting the storm from a different direction, while others were caught off guard and either shipwrecked or lost their homes. A few false typhoon alerts had been announced earlier in the year.

The next morning, the Praya scene from west to east was heart-rending: one could easily find boats capsized and corpses floating and drifting on the water with some bodies washed ashore by the high tides.

The sizeable Stonecutters' Island Gaol was left in ruins and both the Police Courts and Victoria Gaol were unroofed. The damage overall was considered "incalculable".

Ernst Eitel recounted how many of the European and Chinese houses were ruined and became roofless; big trees were unrooted and corpses were found in the ruins and started surfacing at the waterfront from the wrecked ships.

A visitor arriving on a steamer from Peking during the typhoon reported that the waterfront was nearly swept away, hardly a tree was left standing in the Botanical Gardens and many buildings were found roofless and in ruins. People were hastily burying the dead for the heat was intense and there was great concern over the outbreak of contagious diseases.

Following the incident, Brazilian astronomer Francisco Antônio de Almeida, in his 1879 account describes an episode of arson and looting at two warehouses in which foreigners were murdered, for which the two Chinese perpetrators were sentenced to death. Almeida also cites English newspapers of the time who estimated up to eight thousand people killed in the typhoon, many of them being Spanish families fleeing the Carlist Wars, and originally bound for the Philippines.

== Controversy ==
Captain Superintendent of Police Walter Meredith Deane attracted severe criticism for ordering his men confined to barracks rather than to risk rescue of the crews on the wrecked vessels Leonor and Albay. Refusing calls for a public inquiry, Governor Sir Arthur Kennedy passed all papers on the matter to Secretary of State Lord Carnarvon who affirmed Kennedy's decision.

== See also ==
- Causeway Bay Typhoon Shelter
- Typhoon Hato
