= Indo-China Steam Navigation Company Ltd. =

Hong Kong-based shipping line

Indo-China Steam Navigation Co., Ltd
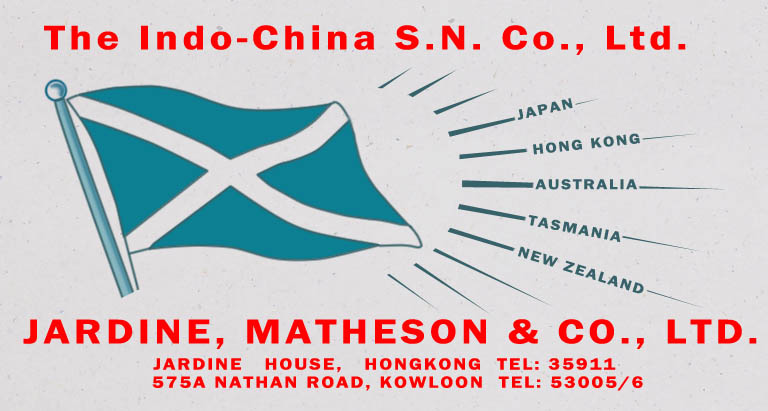
- Masthead of the Indo-China Steam Navigation Co., Ltd
- Company type: Passenger / cargo shipping line
- Founded: 1873
- Founder: Jardine, Matheson & Co.
- Defunct: 1974
- Fate: Liquidated, 1974
- Headquarters: Hong Kong, British Empire
- Area served: Eastern Pacific

Company house flag

The Indo-China Steam Navigation Company, Limited (ICSNC), was established in 1873 as a subsidiary of Hong Kong–based Jardine, Matheson & Co., one of the largest trading companies in the Far East at that time.

== Early history ==
With the advent of steam power, Jardines became concerned that it might lose its former advantage in operating fast clippers. As a result, the company became seriously involved in steamships in the mid-1850s, servicing the Bengal–China trade. Regular services up and down the coast, with occasional diversions to Japan, were implemented around the same time. Jardines established the China Coast Steam Navigation Co. (CCSNC) in 1873, which operated between Chinese ports and Japan. ICSNC was floated on the London Stock Exchange in 1881, with a capital of £449,800 The new company amalgamated the group's river, coastal and cargo interests, taking over CCSNC's coastal fleet and sending ships to Singapore, Calcutta and Vladivostok. In 1885, a new service from Hong Kong to Manila began operating.

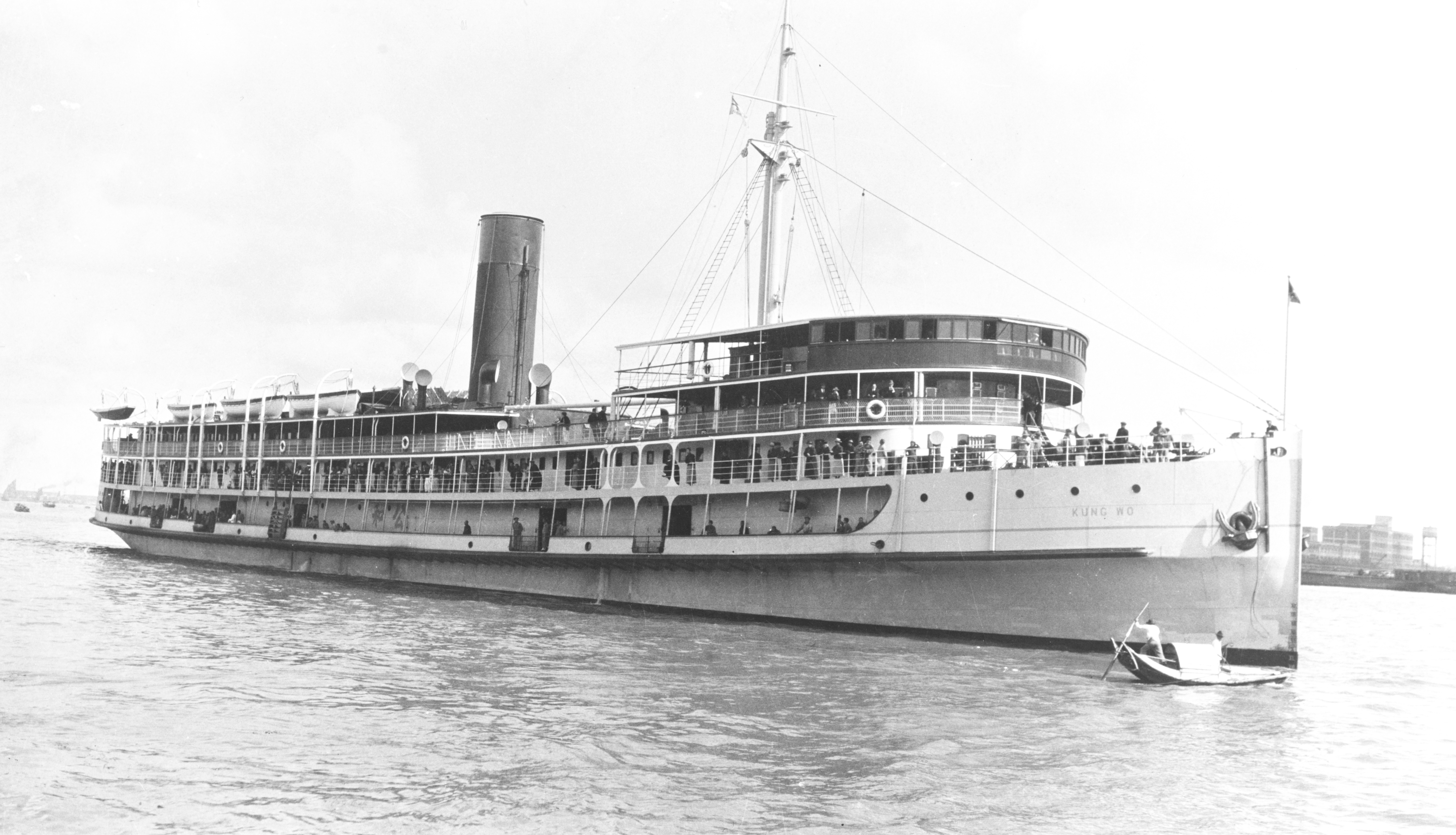
Kung Wo, a Yangtze river steamship built for ICSNC in 1921

In the early 20th century, more than half of all the ships on the Yangtze River were owned by ICSNC and their arch-rivals, Butterfield and Swire. British investment in the Yangtze Valley, including Shanghai, had reached over £200,000,000 by the 1920s. This was almost equal to the amount invested in the whole of British India at that time, and significantly more than British investments in Africa.

Trade flourished until the end of the Second World War, when the 1943 British–Chinese Treaty for the Relinquishment of Extra-Territorial Rights in China shut down the Yangtze River trade and routes between the Chinese coastal ports. In response, ICSNC diversified into the China—Australia trade.

== Post–Second World War ==
The company's funnel colours.

Passenger voyages between the Far East, Straits and Bay of Bengal was abandoned at the end of 1955, and in the same year, Auckland became a port of call on the Australia route.

Between November 1960 and April 1961, Eastern Argosy and Eastern Star were plying the Hong Kong, Brisbane, Sydney, Melbourne, Wellington, Auckland route, returning via Melbourne and Sydney to Hong Kong. Eastern Glory and Eastern Trader operated between Hong Kong, Sydney, Melbourne and Adelaide.

Later on, increased competition from Indian and Japanese companies reduced profitability and ICSNC, London was liquidated in 1974. ICSNC, Hong Kong moved into the bulk shipping business and also became involved in the Gearbulk container pool, as well as branching out into other industries.

== Incidents ==
=== Hip Sang ===
Hip Sang, an ICSNC cargo steamship of 1,659 tons, was lost on 16 July 1904 when she was torpedoed by the Russian destroyer Rastoropny west of the Kwantung Peninsula at 39.10°N 121.15°E after refusing to stop en route from Newchang for Chefoo carrying provisions.

=== Chak Sang ===
On 21 January 1942, the ICSNC owned cargo and passenger steamship Chak Sang was intercepted by a Japanese submarine and sunk west of the Gulf of Martaban, Burma. Five of her crew were killed during the attack.

=== Eastern Saga ===
One of the company's ships, the Eastern Saga arrived in Calcutta from the Far East on October 29, 1957 and was searched by Calcutta Customs Officers on 30 and 31 October and on 12 November, 1957. In the sailors' quarters, the officers found a hole in the wall panelling behind the back of a wooden seat which had been screwed to the wall. The hole was covered with a piece of wood and over-painted. When opened, the hiding place contained 1,458 bars of gold valued at more than Rs. 23 lacs (2.3 million rupees. As illegal gold smuggling was in contravention of India's Sea Customs Act, the ship was liable to be confiscated, despite the gold having been smuggled on board by a crewman without the company's knowledge. ICSNC lost a subsequent court case and appeal and ended up paying 25 lacs (2.5 million rupees) in lieu of confiscation.

== Gallery ==
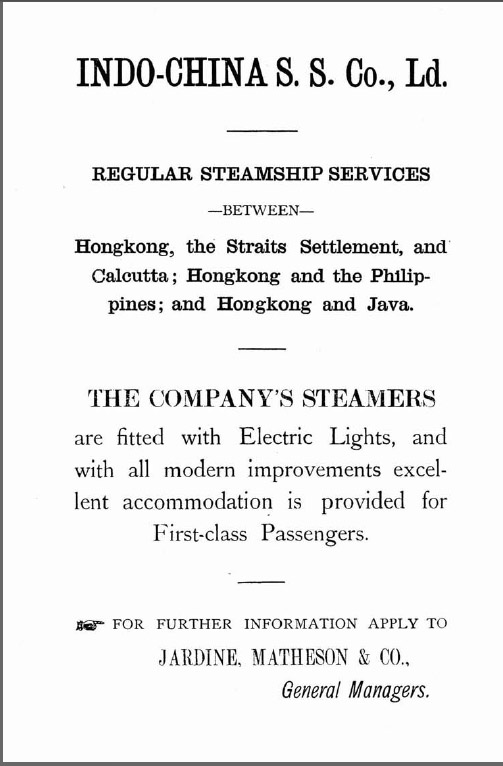
Company advertisement, 1923
