= Linnet-class minelayer =

Royal Navy class of minelayer

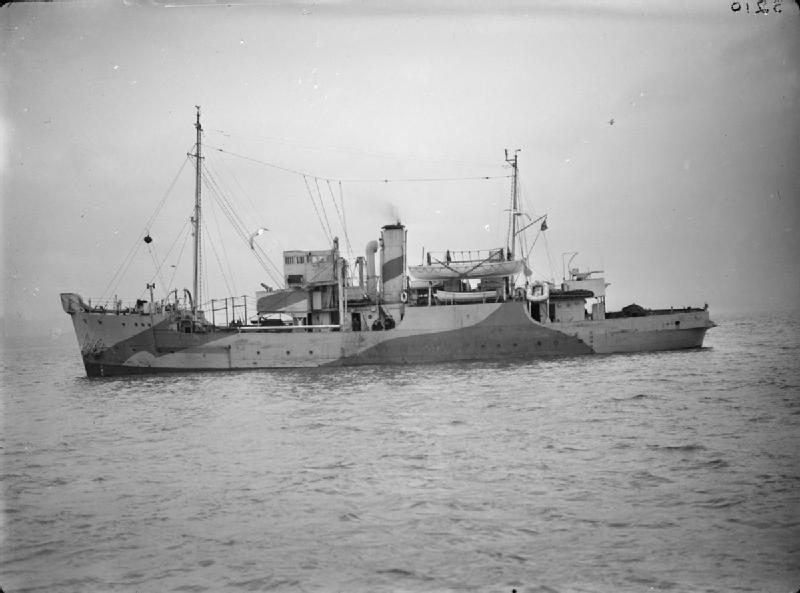
- HMS Ringdove

Class overview
- Name: Linnet
- Operators: Royal Navy
- In commission: 1938–1964
- Completed: 3
- Lost: 1
- Retired: 2

General characteristics
- Type: Minelayer
- Displacement: 498 tons standard
- Length: 145 ft 0 in (44.20 m) (p/p); 163 ft 9 in (49.91 m) (o/a)
- Beam: 27 ft 2 in (8.28 m)
- Draught: 8 ft 0 in (2.44 m)
- Propulsion: Triple expansion engine; 1 shaft; 400 hp (300 kW)
- Speed: 10.5 knots (19.4 km/h)
- Complement: 24
- Armament: 2 × twin 0.303 in machine guns; 1 × Oerlikon 20 mm cannon (from 1942); 12 mines

The Linnet class were a class of three small coastal minelayers commissioned into the Royal Navy just before the Second World War.

== Description ==
The Linnet class were the largest of a dozen specialized vessels known as "Indicator Loop Mine Layers" built for the Royal Navy immediately before and during the Second World War. These vessels were designed to lay controlled mines, used in coastal defences, as well as anti-submarine indicator loops. Similar vessels known as mine planters were operated by the US Army during the same era.

Ships of the class had a displacement of 498 tons standard and a length of 145 ft 0 in (44.20 m) between perpendiculars. They were equipped with a single 20 mm gun and two machine guns. They had two triple expansion engines which allowed the ship to have a maximum speed of 10.5 knots (19.4 km/h; 12.1 mph). There was a complement of 24 officers and crew and a total mine capacity of 12.

== Ships ==
Name	Builder	Launched	Fate	Notes
Linnet (M69)	Ardrossan Dockyard	3 May 1938	Broken up in 1964	Tender to HMS Vernon
Redstart (M62)	Henry Robb	3 May 1938	Scuttled on 19 December 1941	Scuttled in Hong Kong to prevent its capture by the Japanese
Ringdove (M77)	Henry Robb	15 June 1938	Sold in 1950 to Pakistan as a pilot vessel	Tender to HMS Vernon
