= 1906 Hong Kong typhoon =

Fatal tropical cyclone

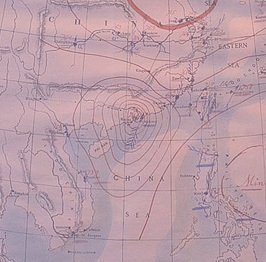
- Surface weather analysis of the typhoon making landfall on September 18

Meteorological history
- Formed: 7 September 1906
- Dissipated: 18 September 1906

Typhoon
- Highest winds: 95 km/h (60 mph)
- Lowest pressure: 979 hPa (mbar); 28.91 inHg (Note: Minimum pressure is only representative of observed values in Hong Kong; the storm was likely strong while over open water earlier in its track.)

Overall effects
- Fatalities: ≥15,000
- Damage: £1 million
- Areas affected: Qing China; British Hong Kong; Portuguese Macau
- Part of the 1906 Pacific typhoon season

The 1906 Hong Kong typhoon was a tropical cyclone that hit Hong Kong on 18 September 1906. The typhoon caused property damage exceeding a million pounds sterling, affected international trade, and took the lives of around 15,000 people.

== Meteorological history ==
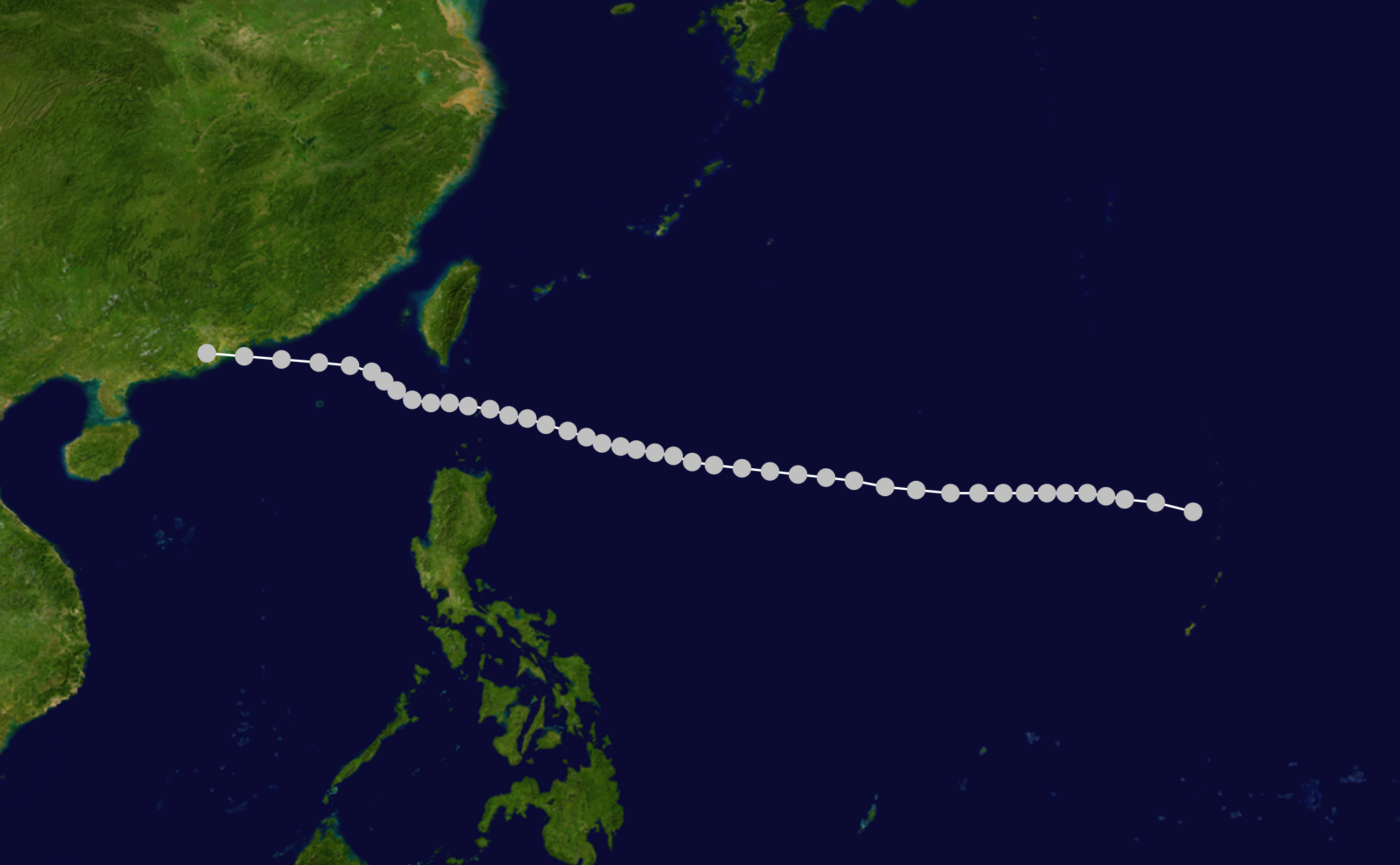
Map plotting the storm's track and intensity, according to the Saffir–Simpson scale Map key Saffir–Simpson scale Tropical depression (≤38 mph, ≤62 km/h) Tropical storm (39–73 mph, 63–118 km/h) Category 1 (74–95 mph, 119–153 km/h) Category 2 (96–110 mph, 154–177 km/h) Category 3 (111–129 mph, 178–208 km/h) Category 4 (130–156 mph, 209–251 km/h) Category 5 (≥157 mph, ≥252 km/h) Unknown Storm type Tropical cyclone Subtropical cyclone Extratropical cyclone, remnant low, tropical disturbance, or monsoon depression

The Hong Kong Observatory recorded the 1906 typhoon as having a velocity of 24 miles per hour (39 km/h) when the eye of the typhoon was 30 nautical miles (56 km) distant and it had a wind force of 6 Bft taken as limit, about 100 miles (160 km) in diameter. The Royal Observatory had recorded the 1896 typhoon (29 July) with a velocity of 108 miles per hour (174 km/h) when the eye of the typhoon was of 47 nautical miles (87 km; 54 mi) distant, and with a wind force 6 taken as limit, about 500 miles (800 km) in diameter.

== Preparations ==
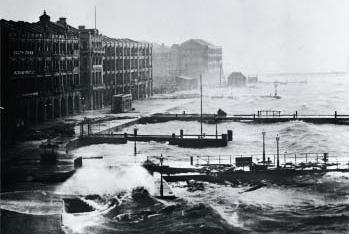
Coastal Hong Kong during the typhoon

The Royal Observatory Hong Kong gave less than a thirty-minute warning of the typhoon, in which time it was already close to Hong Kong waters. A black drum (an official warning to be issued for tropical cyclones from Hong Kong Observatory since 1884) was hoisted at 8:40 am, before the typhoon gun was fired for its harbour warning. By 9:00 am, the ferries had ceased to operate and quite a few of the foreign steamer captains and their sailors were stuck on land, unable to quickly reach their vessels to take any necessary precautions. The barometer showed a rapid drop from 29.74 to 29.28 inHg (1,007 to 992 hPa) between 8:00 am and 10:00 am, within two hours.

There were two reports from Shanghai observatory regarding an advance warning of the 1906 typhoon:

1. Japanese observation from east of Formosa (Taiwan) was said to have given the first warning of calamity by telegraph, calling 'Typhoon South of Meiaco Sima'. It was dated 15 September 1906 (Saturday 11:30 am), three days in advance, moving towards the direction of Taiwan or China.
2. Sicawei Observatory (Chinese: 徐家匯) in Shanghai further reported and based on extracts from logs of ship vessels, about a definitive track of the storm on 15 September (Saturday) and 16 September (Sunday) from the regions of Pacific Ocean and Taiwan, and the track was on 18 September (Tuesday). The 1906 typhoon formed in the southern part near Bashi Channel from WNW or WbN, at a distance 420 miles (680 km) from the China Sea.

== Impact ==
Within two hours of high tide, property damage occurred to the housing properties on the land and the shipping vessels in the port, and an estimated 4,000–10,000 lives might have been lost in the colony.

=== Hong Kong ===
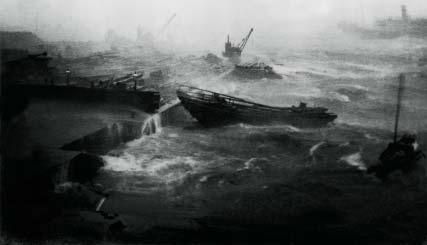
Rough seas in the Hong Kong harbour

Broken glass and roof tiles were thrown everywhere. Tree branches were torn and some trees were even uprooted. The tram lines on Hong Kong Island stopped operation when some of its electric wiring bars were obstructed. The Peak Tram's service was also discontinued for two hours after 10 am, due to the signalling cables getting damaged and the track along Bowen Road being covered. The Botanical Gardens had their trees and flowering plants broken down while the glass house and the zoological department were intact among the havoc.

At West Point many warehouses, including those from Jardine, Matheson & Co. and Jebsen & Co. were unroofed and their main door and front walls were stripped out. The mat-shed roof covering from Blake Pier, Queen's Statue Wharf and Star Ferry Wharf in the Central District collapsed. The bamboo scaffolding structure for the, then-new, General Post Office completely crashed to block the approaching road nearby. Similarly, the then-new Supreme court building also had its site erection suffering from damage to its structure.

=== Offshore incidents ===
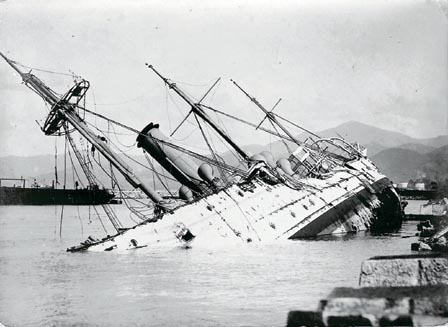
HMS Phoenix, one of the many vessels that sank in the Hong Kong harbour.

Along the praya from West Point (Sai Wan) to East Point (Causeway Bay), many sampans and lighters were damaged and broken down into pieces, the sea passage was obstructed by the floating objects from boat wreckage. Within two hours of the typhoon strike, some European and Chinese bystanders rescued more than 700 people that had fallen from the capsized boat at Wan Chai and East Point (Causeway Bay) areas. From the Kowloon Wharf, the Docks to Sham Shui Po waterfront, sampans and cargoes could not escape the damage and destruction, scattering down the praya. There were casualties in shipwrecks near Kowloon Star Ferry Wharf, such as from the two river steamers Kwangchow and Hongkong, both sunk in the storm with crews and passengers aboard, causing the loss of 300–400 lives. The Wingchai ferry, heading for Macao with 200 passengers on board, was driven back by the typhoon and took refuge at Stonecutters Island and later drifted to the rocks; about twenty of those died.

A few local steamers were sunk outside the Hong Kong harbour. The Mirs Bay ferry (Albatross) sank near the Ninepin islands, with 120 passengers dead. The Sam-chun ferry (Ying Fat) sank near Kap Shui Mun, with 100 passengers dead. A Macao steamer, Heungshan, drifted to Sau-chau, near Lantau Island with 500 passengers on board, and was rescued the next day, with a few casualties. Another Macao steamer, Kinshan, was grounded ashore near Castle Peak. A third Macao steamer, Perseverance, having discharged all its passengers at Chung Chow, sank upon its return and only one crew member survived.

It was estimated that nearly half of the Chinese boating population and their 5,000 licensed watercraft in the colony were struck in this natural disaster. Many people living in houseboats with their families in fishing villages along the coast were mostly affected. Once the typhoon abated, the police and military rescues began as they searched for the injured and retrieved the dead. The Tung Wah Group of Hospitals, a charitable organisation, donated coffins for the burial of the corpses uncovered from the ruins and shipwrecks. There were said to be more than 1,500 unclaimed bodies by the end of September 1906.

== Aftermath ==
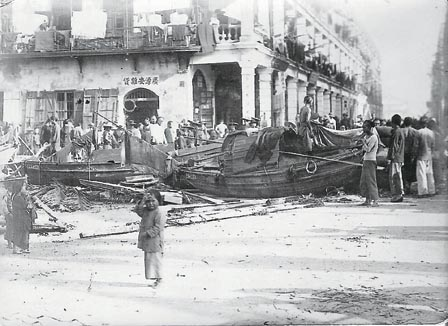
Debris in the streets of Hong Kong following the typhoon

The governor praised the actions of many European and Chinese citizens in carrying out life-saving rescues, and agreed to develop an early warning system for the Hong Kong Observatory, for future typhoon alerts. The governor reported that emergency relief funds of HK$10,000 had been received from overseas Chinese living in San Francisco. In addition local Chinese in the colony had made donations of HK$80,000 within just a few days of the calamity, partially through the efforts of the Tung Wah Hospitals Group, Po Leung Kuk, and the District Watchmen Committee.

Initial contemporary reports estimated a loss of life of 'about 10,000', and later reports suggest it was 16,000, or '5% of the 320,000-strong population in Hong Kong at that time'

The British military authority approved a team of 150 people to help the colonial government clear up the wreckage in the port. Meanwhile, the 1906 typhoon had exerted a great blow and delay to the Hong Kong cargo shipping business, an estimated 2,983 fishing boats and 670 ocean-going vessels were broken up and the wharf and warehouse facilities damaged, suffering from a million dollar loss.

A report of committee appointed to enquire whether earlier warning of the typhoon of 18 September 1906 could have been given to shipping was chaired by Sir Henry Spencer Berkeley, KC (Hong Kong Attorney General, 1902–06) and together with three more members (Lieutenant Butterworth of the Royal Navy, Mr Skottowe of Eastern Extension Telegraph Co., and Captain Sommerville, Steamship Master of SS Tean), they met and gave their findings to the Hong Kong Governor on 23 October 1906. The committee reviewed the conflicting evidence, and reported that they did not find any indication of a typhoon approaching Hong Kong before 7.44 am on 18 September (Tuesday morning), and that warning by the hoisting of the Black Drum (indicating an existence of a typhoon to the east of the Hong Kong within 300 miles) on the Tuesday morning was performed as soon as possible.

== See also ==
- Joseph Hoare (bishop of Victoria)
- French destroyer Fronde
