= Swire (surname) =

Swire is an English surname, and may refer to:

- Several members of the Swire business and political family, descended from John Swire (1793–1847), British trader and founder of the Swire Group
  - Adrian Swire (1932–2018), British businessman and former chairman of the Swire Group, son of John Kidston Swire
  - Barnaby Swire (born 1964), British businessman and current chairman of the Swire Group, son of John Anthony Swire
  - Hugo Swire, Baron Swire (born 1959), British politician, great-great-great-grandson of John Swire and brother of Sophia Swire
  - John Kidston Swire (1893-1983), chairman of Swire Group from 1946 to 1966, grandson of John Samuel Swire
  - John Anthony Swire CBE (1927-2016), former president of the Swire Group, son of John Kidston Swire
  - John Samuel Swire (1825—1898), founder of Taikoo Sugar Refinery in 1881, son of John Swire
  - Samuel Swire (businessman) (born 1980), British businessman, son of Adrian Swire
  - Sophia Swire (born 1963), British social entrepreneur and investor, great-great-great-granddaughter of John Swire and sister of Hugo Swire
- Jim Swire (born 1936), British doctor involved in the investigation of the Lockerbie bombing
- Peter Swire (born 1958), American academic
- Rob Swire (born 1982), Australian record producer
- Vivienne Westwood, née Swire (1941–2022), British fashion designer

== See also ==
- Swire Group – British-owned Hong Kong-based business conglomerate and historical Hongs of Hong Kong
