= John Swire =

John Swire may refer to:

- John Swire (1793–1847), British trader and founder of the Swire Group
- John Samuel Swire (1825–1898), founder of Taikoo Sugar Refinery in 1881
- John Kidston Swire (1893–1983), chairman of Swire Group from 1946 to 1966
- John Anthony Swire (1927–2016), president of John Swire and Sons Ltd
