= Christopher Pratt (disambiguation) =

Christopher Pratt (1935–2022) was a Canadian painter.

Chris Pratt (born 1979) is an American actor.

Christopher Pratt or Chris Pratt may refer to:

- Christopher Dale Pratt (born 1956), British business executive
- Chris Pratt (sailor) (born 1959), Australian Olympic sailor
- Christopher Pratt (sailor), French sailor, 6th place in the 2008 Solitaire du Figaro
- Chris Pratt (show jumping rider) (born 1969), Canadian show jumping rider
- Chris Pratt, a character in The Lookout (2007 film)

== See also ==
- Chris Prat, Canadian lacrosse player
