= Marine steam engine =

Steam engine that is used to power a ship or boat

Marine Steam Engine
- Status: Historical / Legacy
- Year started: 1783
- First published: 1807
- Successor: Steam turbine, Marine diesel engine
- Domain: Marine engineering, ship propulsion

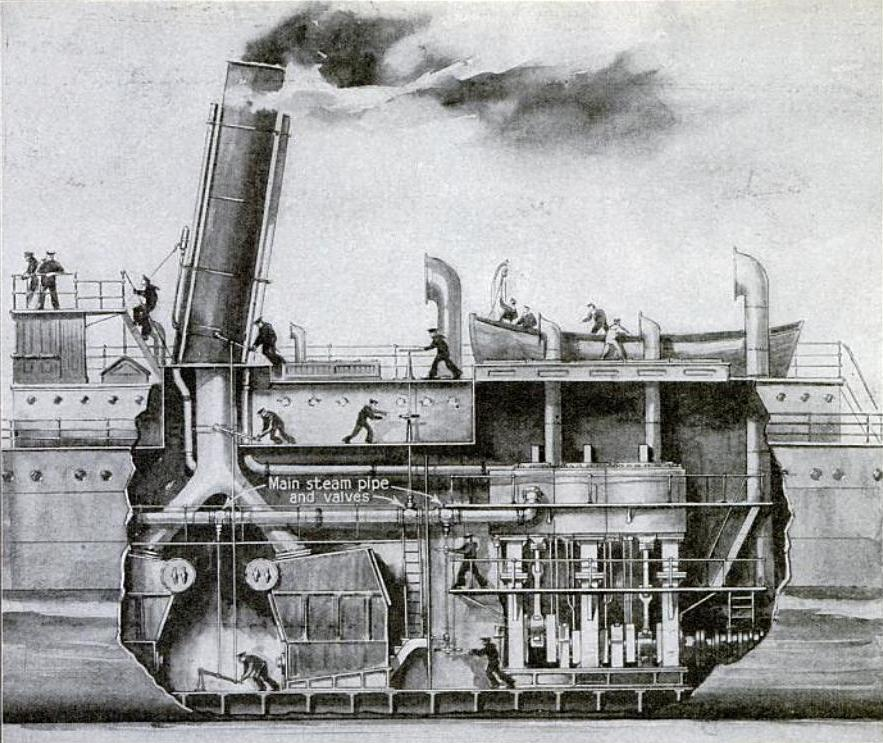
Period cutaway diagram of a triple-expansion steam engine installation, circa 1918. This particular diagram illustrates possible engine cutoff locations, after the Lusitania disaster and others made it clear that this was an important safety feature.

A marine steam engine is a steam engine that is used to power a ship or boat. This article deals mainly with marine steam engines of the reciprocating type, which were in use from the inception of the steamboat in the early 19th century to their last years of large-scale manufacture during World War II. Reciprocating steam engines were progressively replaced in marine applications during the 20th century by steam turbines and marine diesel engines.

== History ==
The first commercially successful steam engine was developed by Thomas Newcomen in 1712. The steam engine improvements brought forth by James Watt in the later half of the 18th century greatly improved steam engine efficiency and allowed more compact engine arrangements. Successful adaptation of the steam engine to marine applications in England would have to wait until almost a century after Newcomen, when Scottish engineer William Symington built the world's "first practical steamboat", the Charlotte Dundas, in 1802. Rivaling inventors James Rumsey and John Fitch were the first to build steamboats in the United States. Rumsey exhibited his steamboat design in 1787 on the Potomac River; however, Fitch won the rivalry in 1790 after his successful test resulted in a passenger service on the Delaware River. In 1807, the American Robert Fulton built the world's first commercially successful steamboat, simply known as the North River Steamboat, and powered by a Watt engine.

Following Fulton's success, the steamboat technology developed rapidly on both sides of the Atlantic. Steamboats initially had a short range and were not particularly seaworthy due to their weight, low power, and tendency to break down, but they were employed successfully along rivers and canals, and for short journeys along the coast. The first successful transatlantic crossing by a steamship occurred in 1819 when Savannah sailed from Savannah, Georgia to Liverpool, England. The first steamship to make regular transatlantic crossings was the sidewheel steamer Great Western in 1838.

As the 19th century progressed, marine steam engines and steamship technology developed alongside each other. Paddle propulsion gradually gave way to the screw propeller, and the introduction of iron and later steel hulls to replace the traditional wooden hull allowed ships to grow ever larger, necessitating steam power plants that were increasingly complex and powerful.

== Types of marine steam engine ==
A wide variety of reciprocating marine steam engines were developed over the course of the 19th century. The two main methods of classifying such engines are by connection mechanism and cylinder technology.

Most early marine engines had the same cylinder technology (simple expansion, see below) but a number of different methods of supplying power to the crankshaft (i.e. connection mechanism) were in use. Thus, early marine engines are classified mostly according to their connection mechanism. Some common connection mechanisms were side-lever, steeple, walking beam and direct-acting (see following sections).

However, steam engines can also be classified according to cylinder technology (simple-expansion, compound, annular etc.). One can therefore find examples of engines classified under both methods. An engine can be a compound walking beam type, compound being the cylinder technology, and walking beam being the connection method. Over time, as most engines became direct-acting but cylinder technologies grew more complex, engines began to be classified solely according to cylinder technology.

More commonly encountered marine steam engine types are listed in the following sections. Note that not all these terms are exclusive to marine applications.

== Engines classified by connection mechanism ==
=== Side-lever ===
The side-lever engine was the first type of steam engine widely adopted for marine use in Europe. In the early years of steam navigation (from c. 1815), the side-lever was the most common type of marine engine for inland waterway and coastal service in Europe, and it remained for many years the preferred engine for oceangoing service on both sides of the Atlantic.

The side-lever was an adaptation of the earliest form of steam engine, the beam engine. The typical side-lever engine had a pair of heavy horizontal iron beams, known as side-levers, each secured in the centre by a pin near the base of the engine, allowing the levers to pivot through a limited arc. The engine cylinder stood vertically between this pair of levers at one end, with the piston rod attached to a horizontal crosshead above, from each end of which a vertical rod, known as a side-rod, extended down each side of the cylinder to connect to the end of the side-lever on the same side. The far ends of the two side-levers were connected to one another by a horizontal crosstail, from which extended a single, common connecting rod which operated the crankshaft as the levers rocked up and down around the central pin.

The main disadvantage of the side-lever engine was that it was large and heavy. For inland waterway and coastal service, lighter and more efficient designs soon replaced it. It remained the dominant engine type for oceangoing service through much of the first half of the 19th century however, due to its relatively low centre of gravity, which gave ships more stability in heavy seas. It was also a common early engine type for warships, since its relatively low height made it less susceptible to battle damage. From the first Royal Navy steam vessel in 1820 until 1840, 70 steam vessels entered service, the majority with side-lever engines, using boilers set to 4psi maximum pressure. The low steam pressures dictated the large cylinder sizes for the side-lever engines, though the effective pressure on the piston was the difference between the boiler pressure and the vacuum in the condenser.

The side-lever engine was a paddlewheel engine and was not suitable for driving screw propellers. The last ship built for transatlantic service that had a side-lever engine was the Cunard Line's paddle steamer RMS Scotia, considered an anachronism when it entered service in 1862.

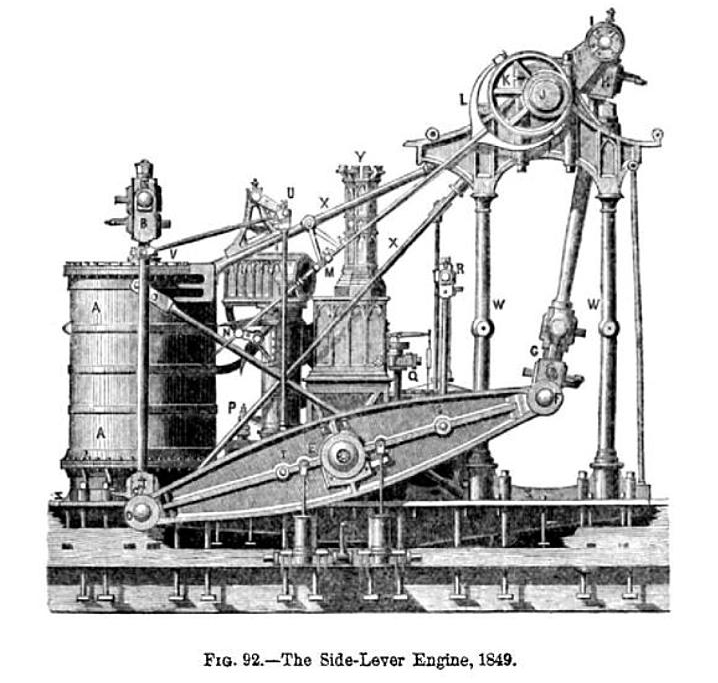
Side-lever engine of SS Pacific (1849)

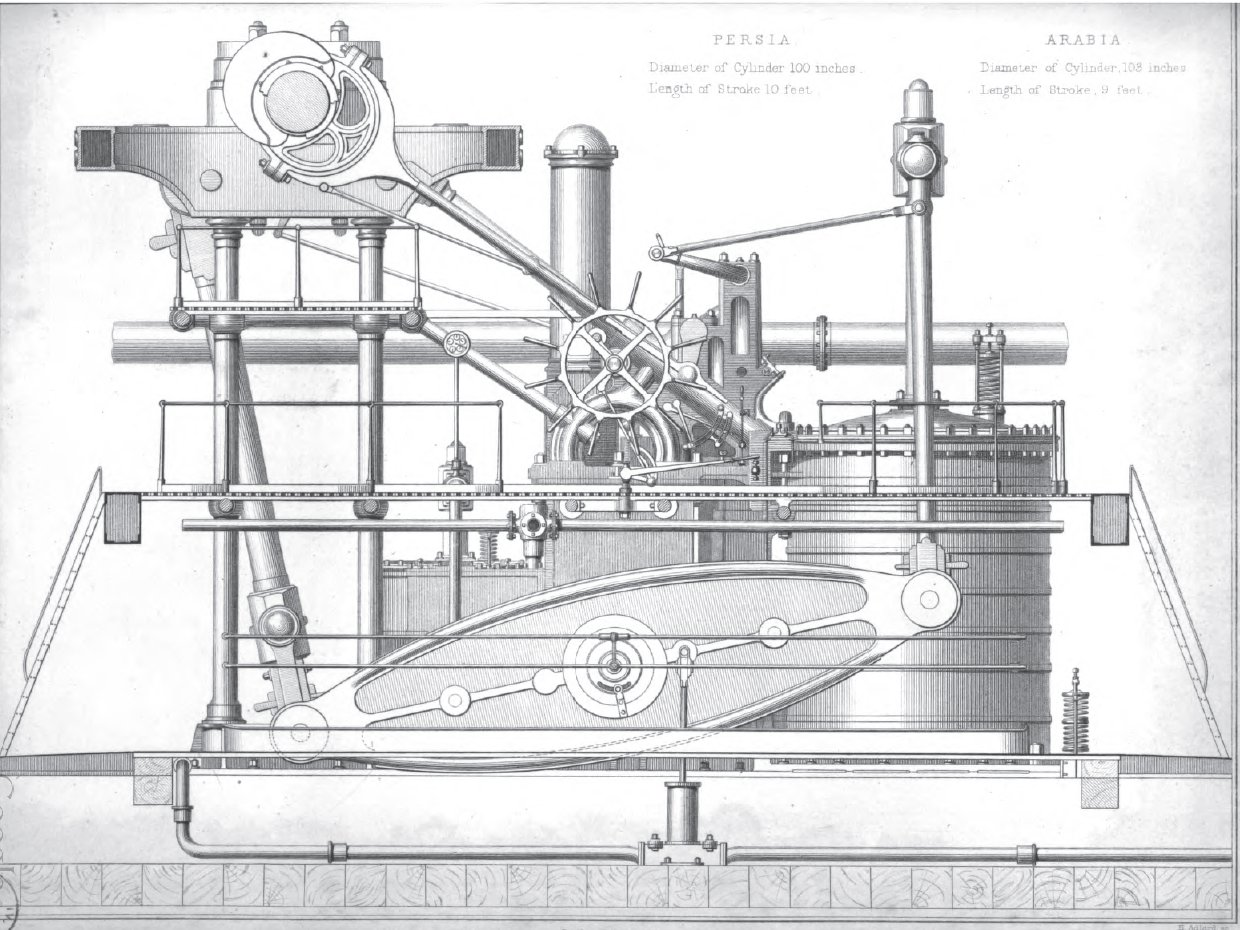
Side-lever engine of RMS Persia (1855)

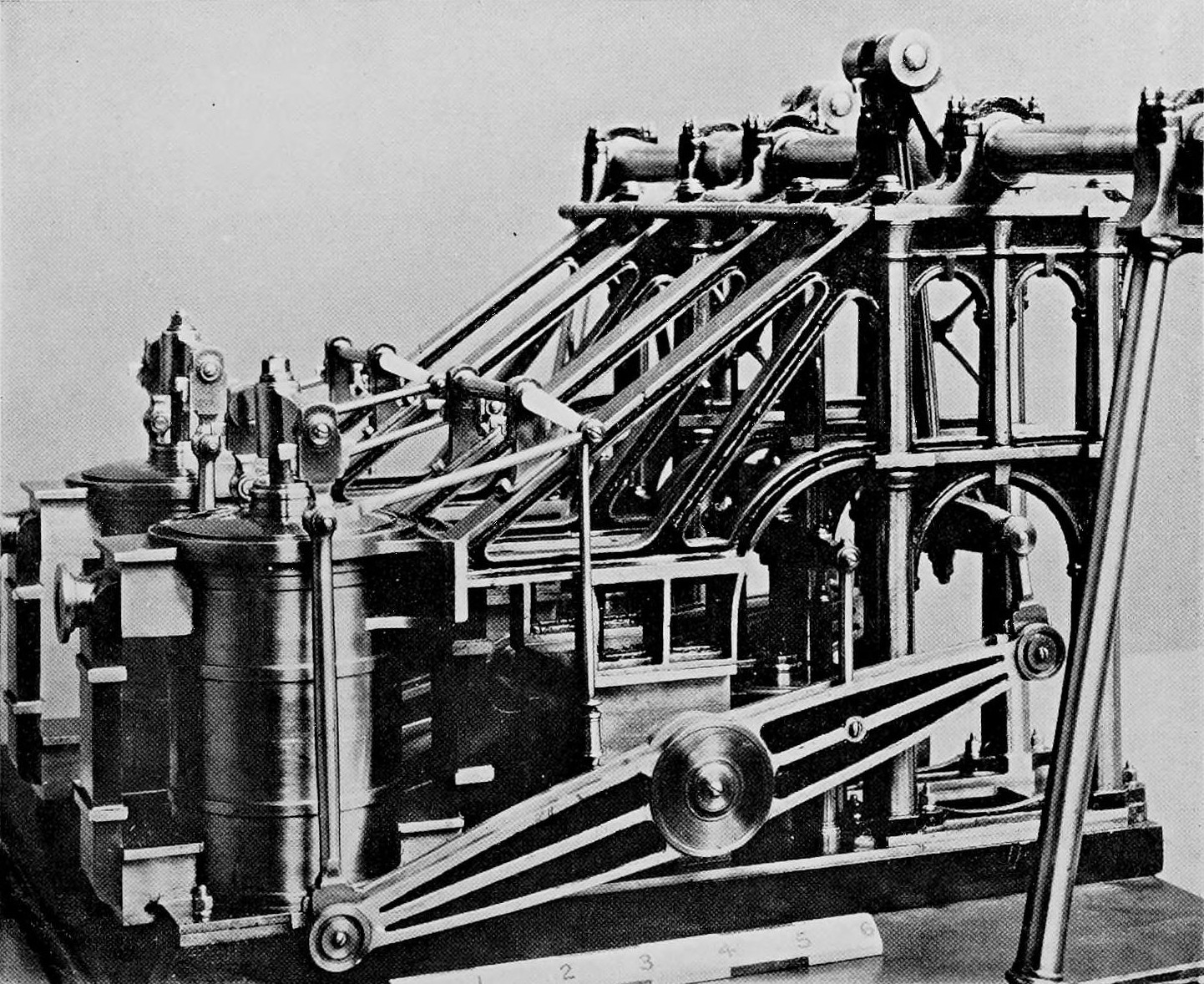
Model of the twin side-lever engines of the 1836 Thames River steamboat Ruby

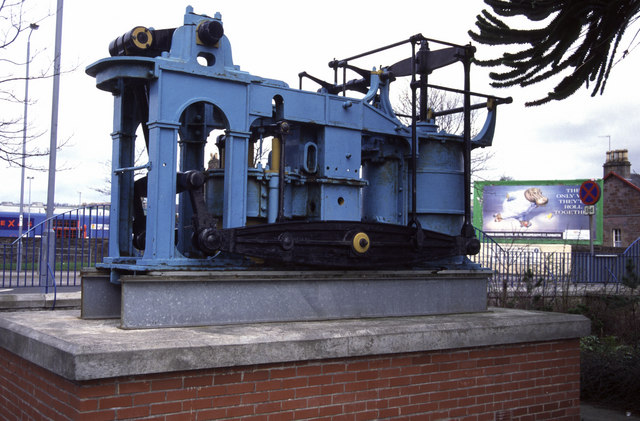
Early Napier side-lever engine from PS Leven, on display at Dumbarton, Scotland

=== Grasshopper ===
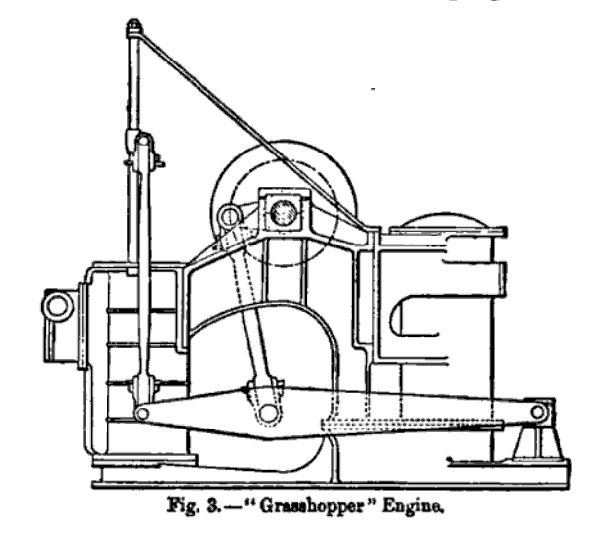
Diagram of a grasshopper engine

The grasshopper or half-lever engine was a variant of the side-lever engine. The grasshopper engine differs from the conventional side-lever in that the location of the lever pivot and connecting rod are more or less reversed, with the pivot located at one end of the lever instead of the centre, while the connecting rod is attached to the lever between the cylinder at one end and the pivot at the other.

Chief advantages of the grasshopper engine were cheapness of construction and robustness, with the type said to require less maintenance than any other type of marine steam engine. Another advantage is that the engine could be easily started from any crank position. Like the conventional side-lever engine however, grasshopper engines were disadvantaged by their weight and size. They were mainly used in small watercraft such as riverboats and tugs.

=== Crosshead (square) ===
The crosshead engine, also known as a square, sawmill or A-frame engine, was a type of paddlewheel engine used in the United States. It was the most common type of engine in the early years of American steam navigation.

The crosshead engine is described as having a vertical cylinder above the crankshaft, with the piston rod secured to a horizontal crosshead, from each end of which, on opposite sides of the cylinder, extended a connecting rod that rotated its own separate crankshaft. The crosshead moved within vertical guides so that the assembly maintained the correct path as it moved. The engine's alternative name—"A-frame"—presumably derived from the shape of the frames that supported these guides. Some crosshead engines had more than one cylinder, in which case the piston rods were usually all connected to the same crosshead.

Because the cylinder was above the crankshaft in this type of engine, it had a high center of gravity, and was therefore deemed unsuitable for oceangoing service. This largely confined it to vessels built for inland waterways. As marine engines grew steadily larger and heavier through the 19th century, the high center of gravity of square crosshead engines became increasingly impractical, and by the 1840s, ship builders abandoned them in favor of the walking beam engine.

The name of this engine can cause confusion, as "crosshead" is also an alternative name for the steeple engine (below). Many sources thus prefer to refer to it by its informal name of "square" engine to avoid confusion. Additionally, the marine crosshead or square engine described in this section should not be confused with the term "square engine" as applied to internal combustion engines, which in the latter case refers to an engine whose bore is equal to its stroke.

Model of a crosshead or "square" engine, showing location of engine cylinder above the crankshaft; also piston rod, crosshead, connecting rods and paddlewheels

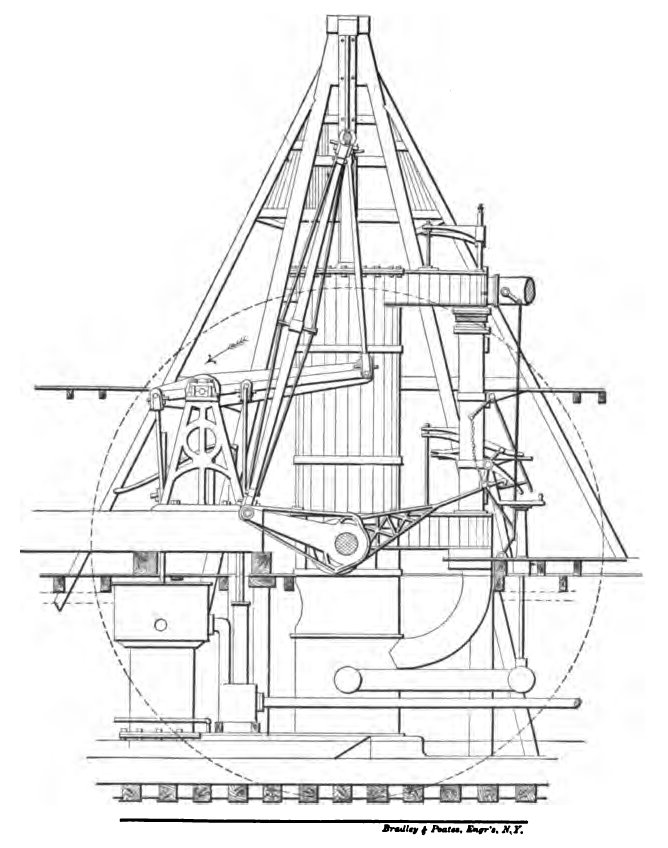
Diagram of a typical Hudson River steamboat crosshead engine (side view)

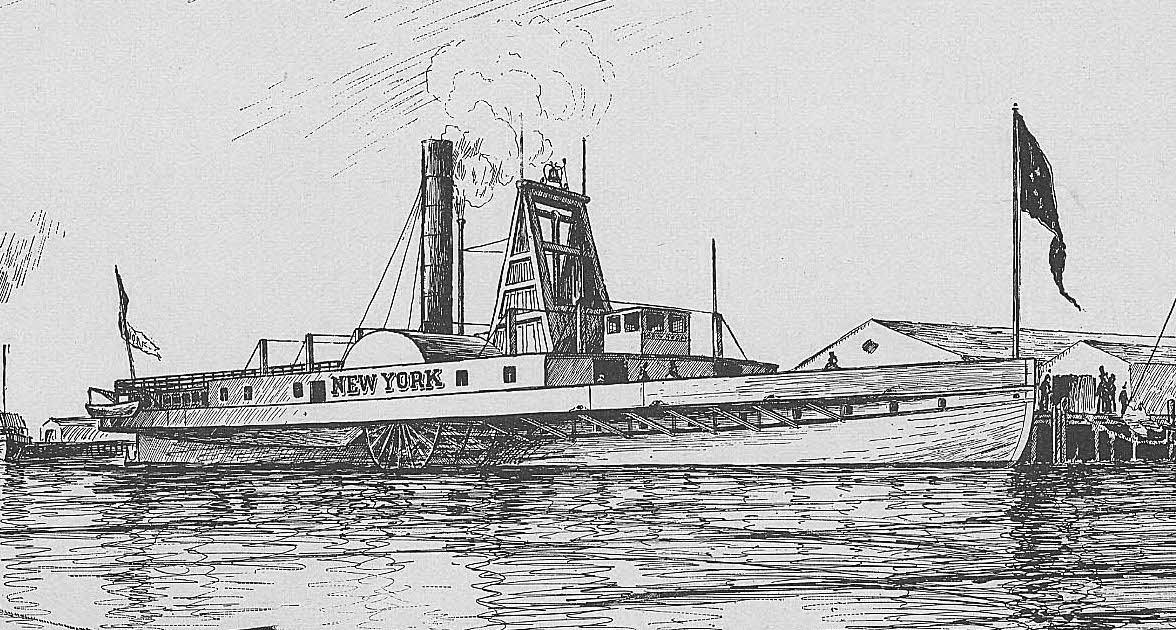
The 1836 paddle steamer New York. Between the paddlewheels is the tall square or "A-frame" engine, within which can be seen the long piston rod, near the top of its stroke, making a "T" with the horizontal crosshead

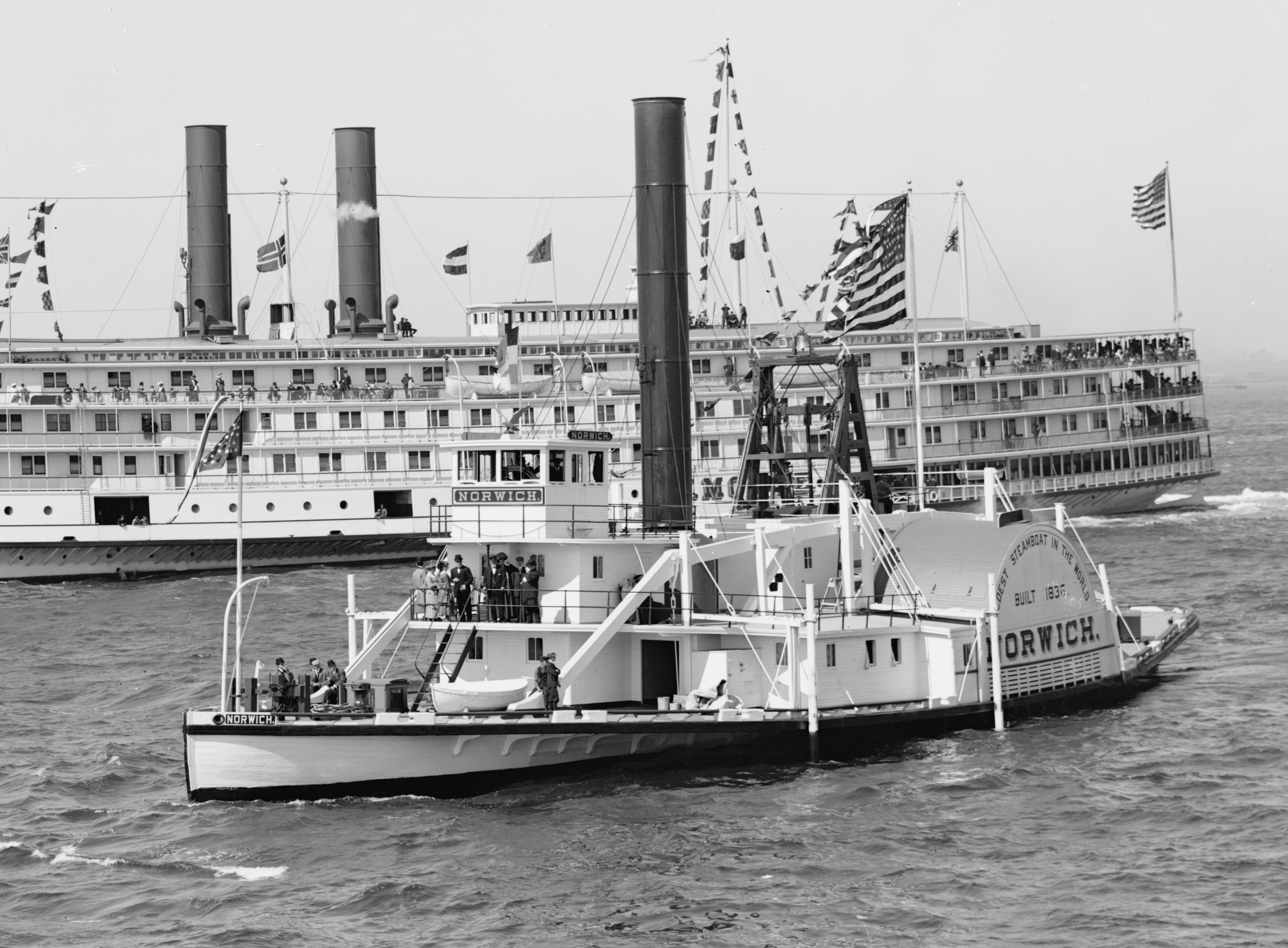
The steamboat Norwich, showing her crosshead engine in operation

=== Walking beam ===
The walking beam, technically known as a vertical beam or overhead beam, and sometimes simply referred as a "beam", was another early adaptation of the beam engine, but its use was confined almost entirely to the United States. After its introduction, the walking beam quickly became the most popular engine type in American waters for inland waterway and coastal service, eventually making its way into American transoceanic steamships as well. The type proved to have remarkable longevity, with walking beam engines still being occasionally manufactured as late as the 1940s. In marine applications, the beam itself was generally reinforced with iron struts that gave it a characteristic diamond shape, although the supports on which the beam rested were often built of wood. The adjective "walking" is believed to have originated from a corruption of the technical term "working beam".

Walking beam engines were a type of paddlewheel engine and were rarely used for powering propellers. They were used primarily for ships and boats working in rivers, lakes and along the coastline, but were a less popular choice for seagoing vessels because the great height of the engine made the vessel less stable in heavy seas. They were also of limited use militarily, because the engine was exposed to enemy fire and could thus be easily disabled. Their popularity in the United States was due primarily to the fact that the walking beam engine was well suited for the shallow-draft boats that operated in America's shallow coastal and inland waterways.

Walking beam engines remained popular with American shipping lines and excursion operations right into the early 20th century. Although the walking beam engine was technically obsolete in the later 19th century, it remained popular with excursion steamer passengers who expected to see the "walking beam" in motion. There were also technical reasons for retaining the walking beam engine in America, as it was easier to build, requiring less precision in its construction. Wood could be used for the main frame of the engine, at a much lower cost than typical practice of using iron castings for more modern engine designs. Fuel was also much cheaper in America than in Europe, so the lower efficiency of the walking beam engine was less of a consideration. The Philadelphia shipbuilder Charles H. Cramp blamed America's general lack of competitiveness with the British shipbuilding industry in the mid-to-late 19th century upon the conservatism of American domestic shipbuilders and shipping line owners, who doggedly clung to outdated technologies like the walking beam and its associated paddlewheel long after they had been abandoned in other parts of the world.

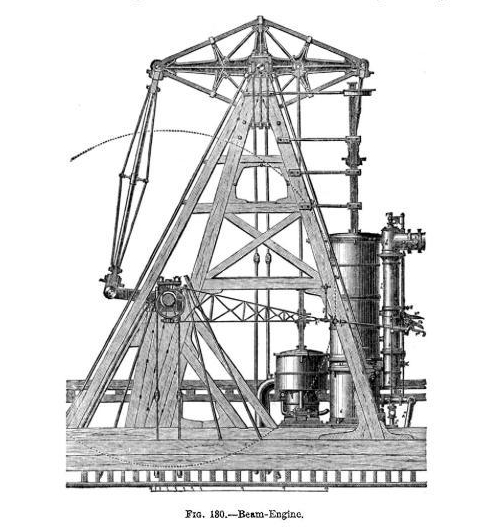
Basic diagram of a walking beam engine

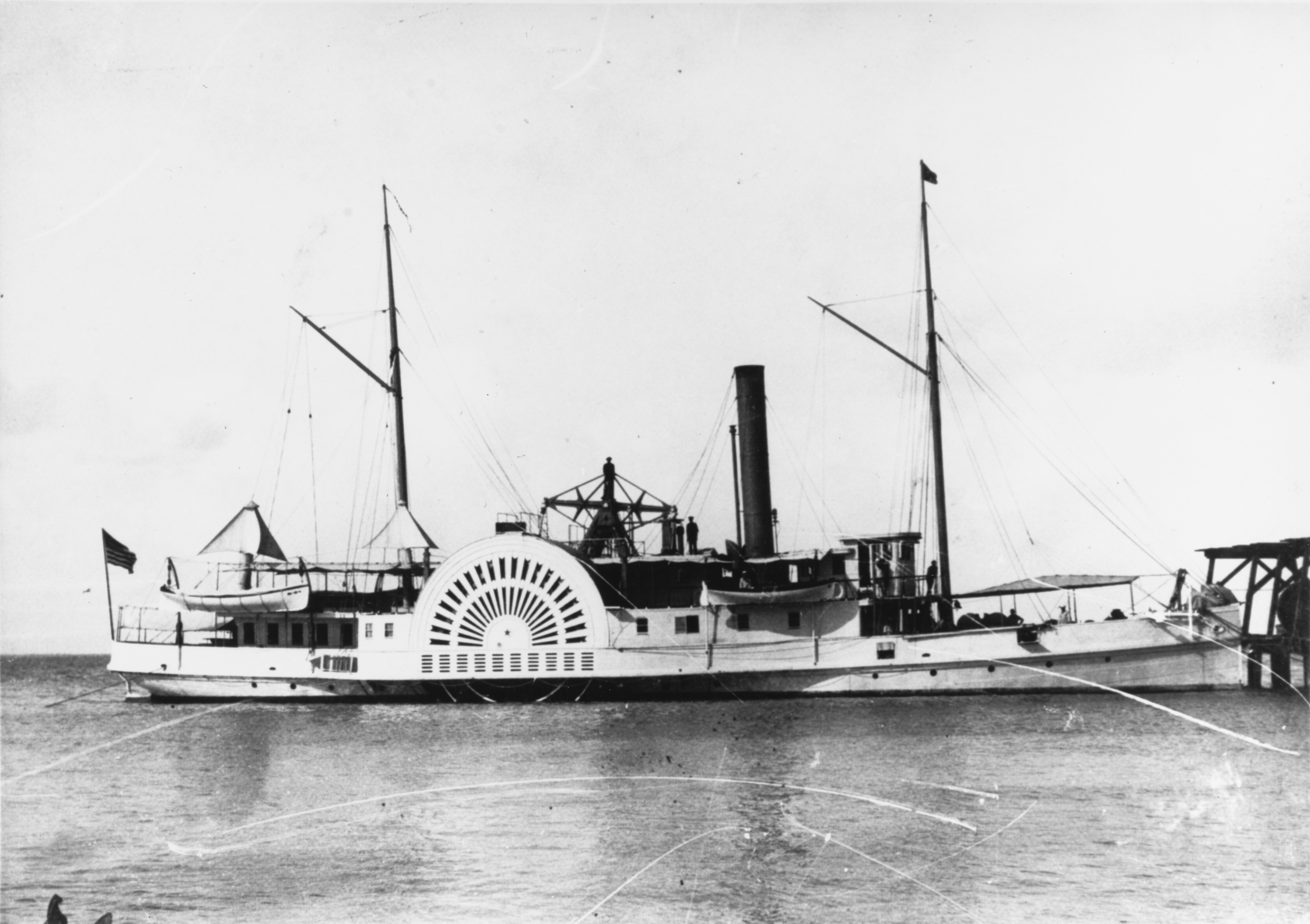
USS Delaware (1861). The vessel's diamond shaped "walking beam" can clearly be seen amidships

=== Steeple ===
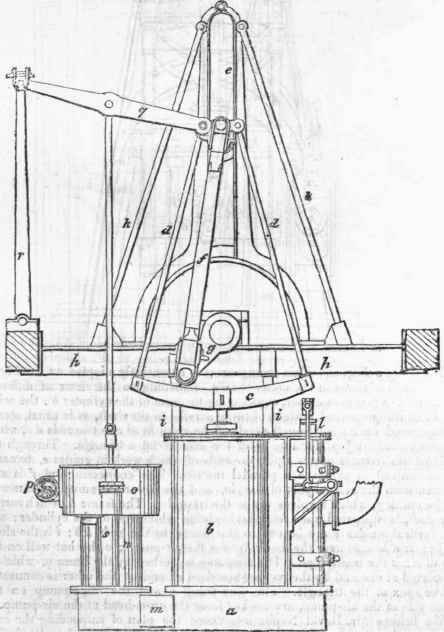
Steeple engine

The steeple engine, sometimes referred to as a "crosshead" engine, was an early attempt to break away from the beam concept common to both the walking beam and side-lever types, and come up with a smaller, lighter, more efficient design. In a steeple engine, the vertical oscillation of the piston is not converted to a horizontal rocking motion as in a beam engine, but is instead used to move an assembly, composed of a crosshead and two rods, through a vertical guide at the top of the engine, which in turn works the crankshaft connecting rod below. In early examples of the type, the crosshead assembly was rectangular in shape, but over time it was refined into an elongated triangle. The triangular assembly above the engine cylinder gives the engine its characteristic "steeple" shape, hence the name.

Steeple engines were tall like walking beam engines, but much narrower laterally, saving both space and weight. Because of their height and high centre of gravity, they were, like walking beams, considered less appropriate for oceangoing service, but they remained highly popular for several decades, especially in Europe, for inland waterway and coastal vessels.

Steeple engines began to appear in steamships in the 1830s and the type was perfected in the early 1840s by the Scottish shipbuilder David Napier. The steeple engine was gradually superseded by the various types of direct-acting engine.

=== Siamese ===
The Siamese engine, also referred to as the "double cylinder" or "twin cylinder" engine, was another early alternative to the beam or side-lever engine. This type of engine had two identical, vertical engine cylinders arranged side by side, whose piston rods were attached to a common, T-shaped crosshead. The vertical arm of the crosshead extended down between the two cylinders and was attached at the bottom to both the crankshaft connecting rod and to a guide block that slid between the vertical sides of the cylinders, enabling the assembly to maintain the correct path as it moved.

The Siamese engine was invented by British engineer Joseph Maudslay (son of Henry), but although he invented it after his oscillating engine (see below), it failed to achieve the same widespread acceptance, as it was only marginally smaller and lighter than the side-lever engines it was designed to replace. It was, however, used on a number of mid-century warships, including the first warship fitted with a screw propeller, HMS Rattler.

Basic diagram of a Siamese engine

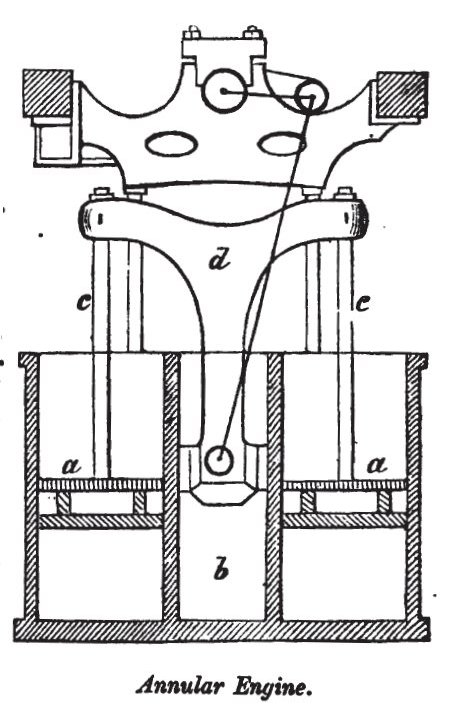
Diagram of an annular engine (see below) with Siamese connection mechanism

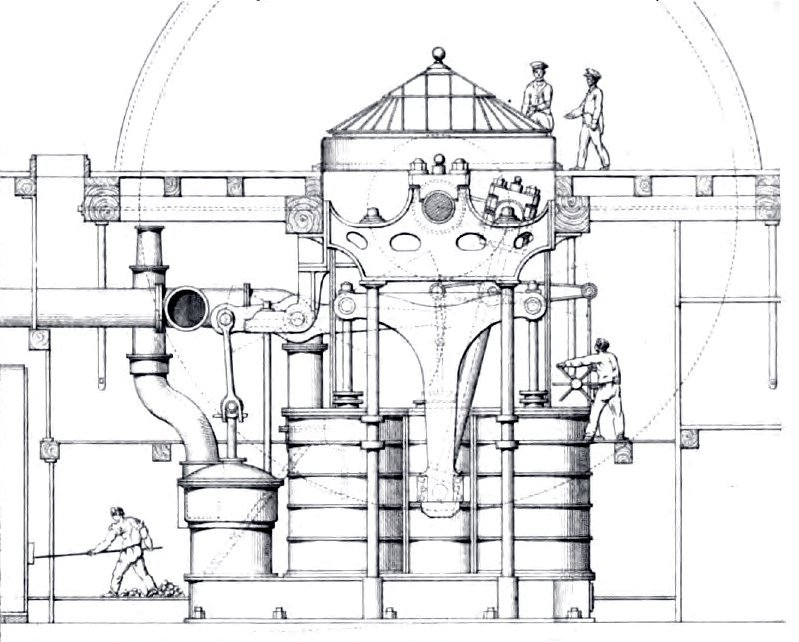
Siamese engine of HMS Retribution (1844)

=== Direct acting ===
There are two definitions of a direct-acting engine encountered in 19th-century literature. The earlier definition applies the term "direct-acting" to any type of engine other than a beam (i.e. walking beam, side-lever or grasshopper) engine. The later definition only uses the term for engines that apply power directly to the crankshaft via the piston rod and/or connecting rod. Unless otherwise noted, this article uses the later definition.

Unlike the side-lever or beam engine, a direct-acting engine could be readily adapted to power either paddlewheels or a propeller. As well as offering a lower profile, direct-acting engines had the advantage of being smaller and weighing considerably less than beam or side-lever engines. The Royal Navy found that on average a direct-acting engine (early definition) weighed 40% less and required an engine room only two-thirds the size of that for a side-lever of equivalent power. One disadvantage of such engines is that they were more prone to wear and tear and thus required more maintenance.

=== Oscillating ===
An oscillating engine was a type of direct-acting engine that was designed to achieve further reductions in engine size and weight. Oscillating engines had the piston rods connected directly to the crankshaft, dispensing with the need for connecting rods. To achieve this, the engine cylinders were not immobile as in most engines, but secured in the middle by trunnions that let the cylinders themselves pivot back and forth as the crankshaft rotated—hence the term, oscillating. Steam was supplied and exhausted through the trunnions. The oscillating motion of the cylinder was usually used to line up ports in the trunnions to direct the steam feed and exhaust to the cylinder at the correct times. However, separate valves were often provided, controlled by the oscillating motion. This let the timing be varied to enable expansive working (as in the engine in the paddle ship PD Krippen). This provides simplicity but still retains the advantages of compactness.

The first patented oscillating engine was built by Joseph Maudslay in 1827, but the type is considered to have been perfected by John Penn. Oscillating engines remained a popular type of marine engine for much of the 19th century.

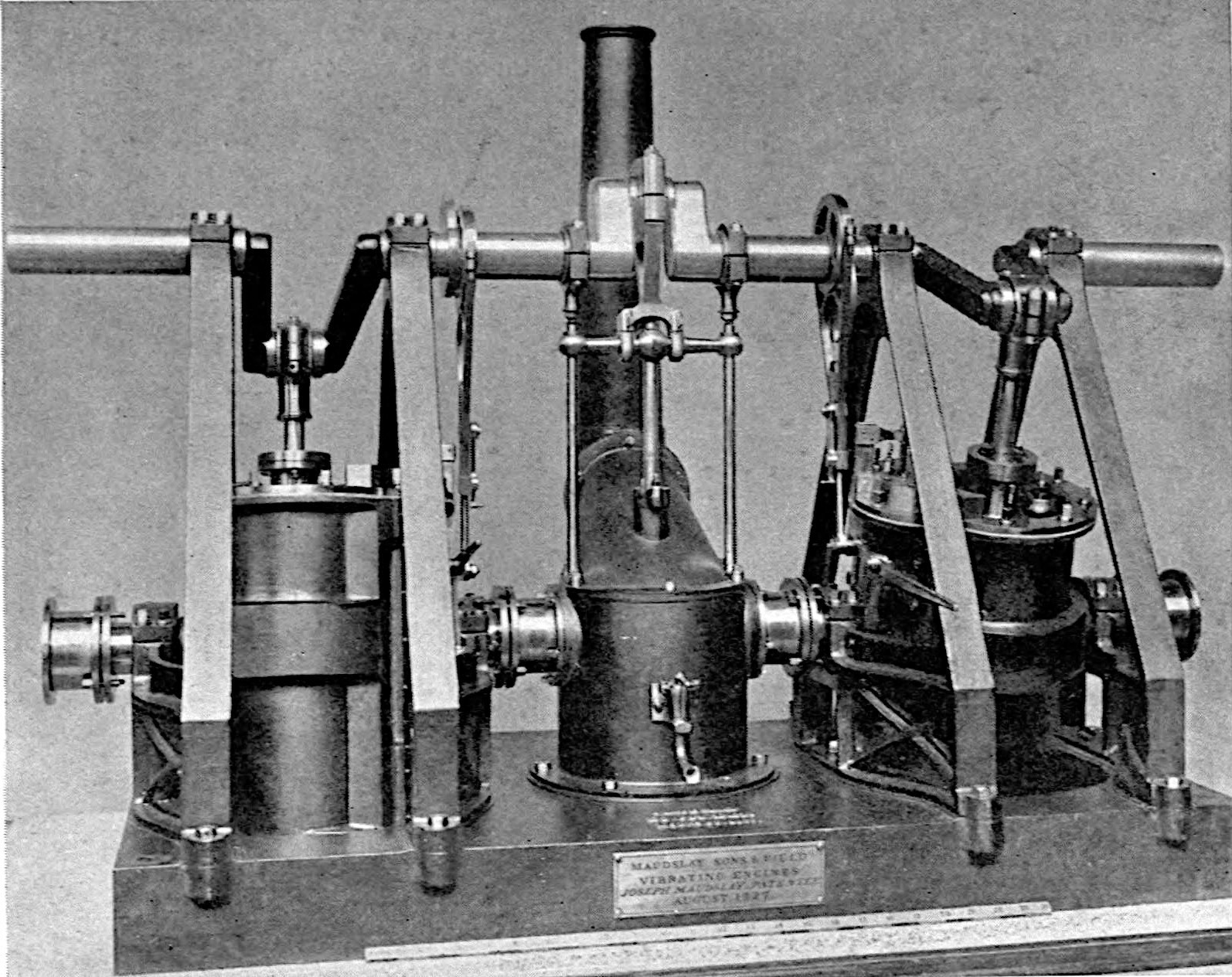
Model of a Maudslay oscillating engine

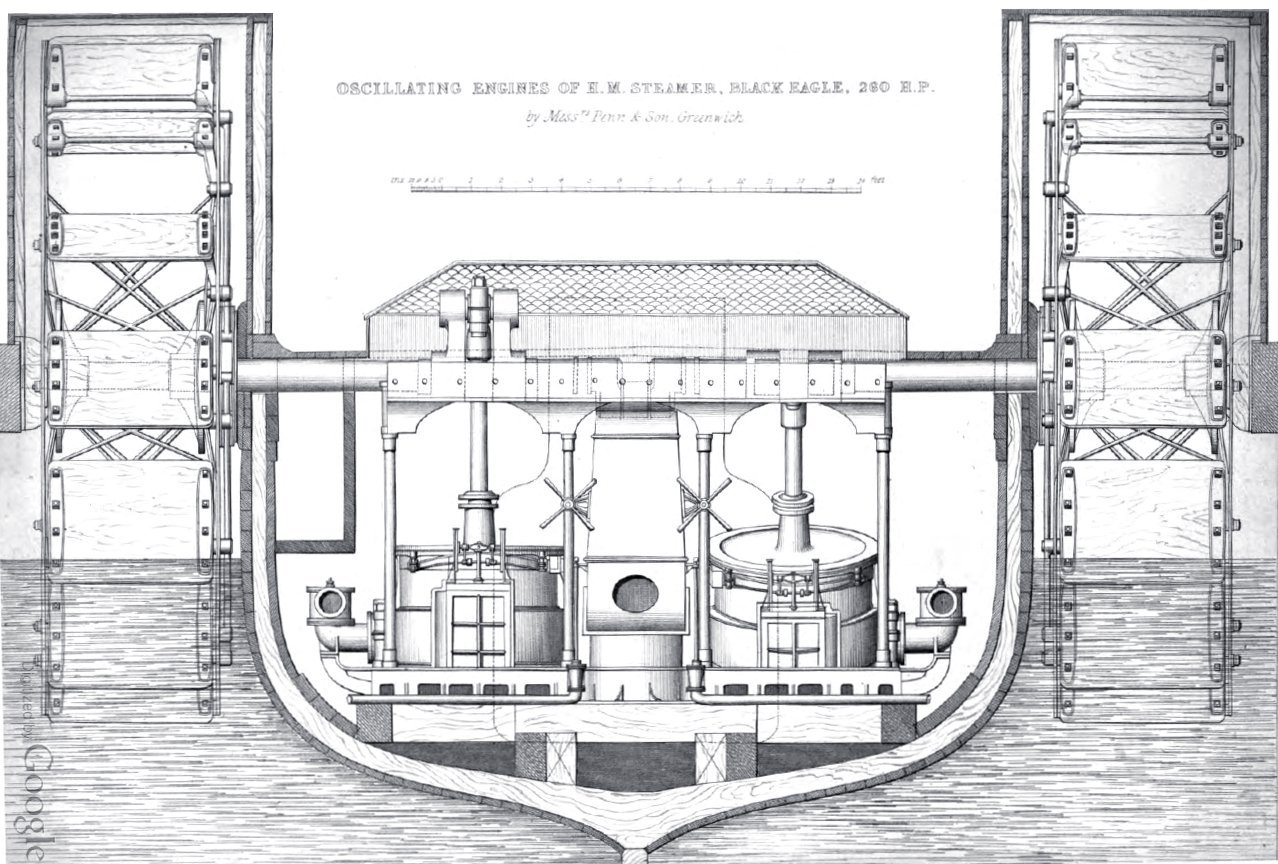
Oscillating paddlewheel engines of HMS Black Eagle. Oscillating engines could be used to drive either paddlewheels or propellers.

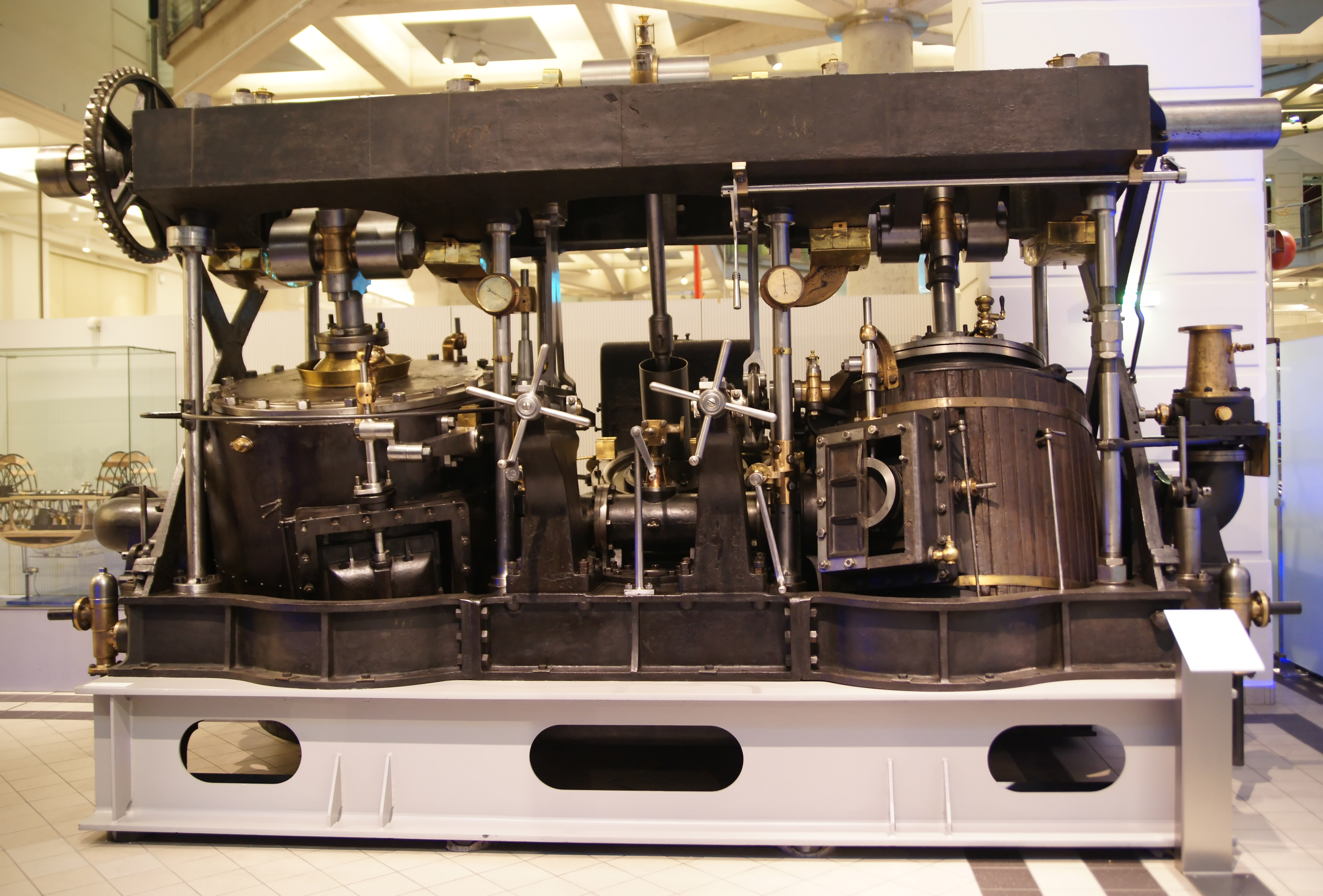
Oscillating engine built in 1853 by J. & A. Blyth of London for the Austrian paddle steamer Orsova

=== Trunk ===
The trunk engine, another type of direct-acting engine, was originally developed as a means of reducing an engine's height while retaining a long stroke. (A long stroke was considered important at this time because it reduced the strain on components.)

A trunk engine locates the connecting rod within a large-diameter hollow piston. This "trunk" carries almost no load. The interior of the trunk is open to outside air, and is wide enough to accommodate the side-to-side motion of the connecting rod, which links a gudgeon pin at the piston head to an outside crankshaft.

The walls of the trunk were either bolted to the piston or cast as one piece with it, and moved back and forth with it. The working portion of the cylinder is annular or ring-shaped, with the trunk passing through the centre of the cylinder itself.

Early examples of trunk engines had vertical cylinders. However, ship builders quickly realized that the type was compact enough to lay horizontally across the keel. In this configuration, it was very useful to navies, as it had a profile low enough to fit entirely below a ship's waterline, as safe as possible from enemy fire. The type was generally produced for military service by John Penn.

Trunk engines were common on mid-19th century warships. They also powered commercial vessels, where—though valued for their compact size and low centre of gravity—they were expensive to operate. Trunk engines, however, did not work well with the higher boiler pressures that became prevalent in the latter half of the 19th century due to the difficulty of maintaining a steam seal around the trunk, and builders abandoned them for other solutions.

Trunk engines were normally large, but a small, mass-produced, high-revolution, high-pressure version was produced for the Crimean War. In being quite effective, the type persisted in later gunboats. An original trunk engine of the gunboat type exists in the Western Australian Museum in Fremantle. After sinking in 1872, it was raised in 1985 from SS Xantho and can now be turned over by hand. The engine's mode of operation, illustrating its compact nature, could be viewed on the Xantho project's website.

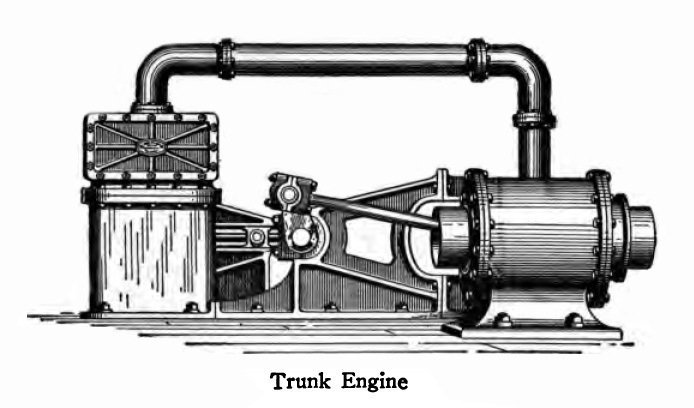
Trunk engine illustration

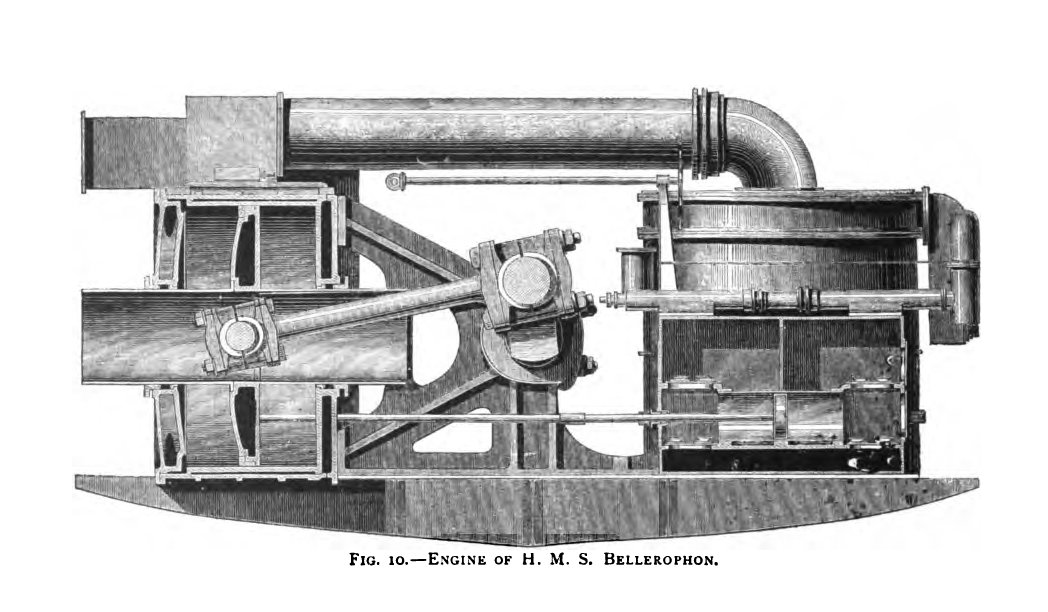
Cutaway view of trunk engine of HMS Bellerophon, showing (on the left) engine cylinder, annular piston and trunk assembly, and connecting rod inside trunk

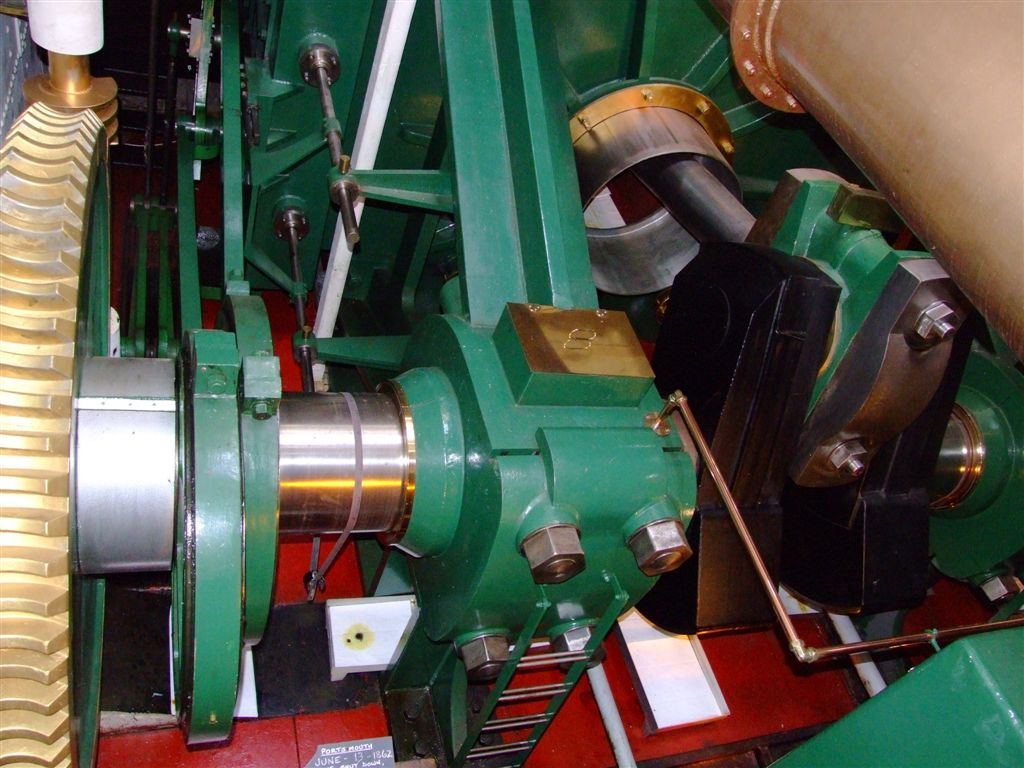
Looking down at the trunk engine of HMS Warrior (1860). The connecting rod can be seen emerging from the trunk at right.

=== Vibrating-lever ===
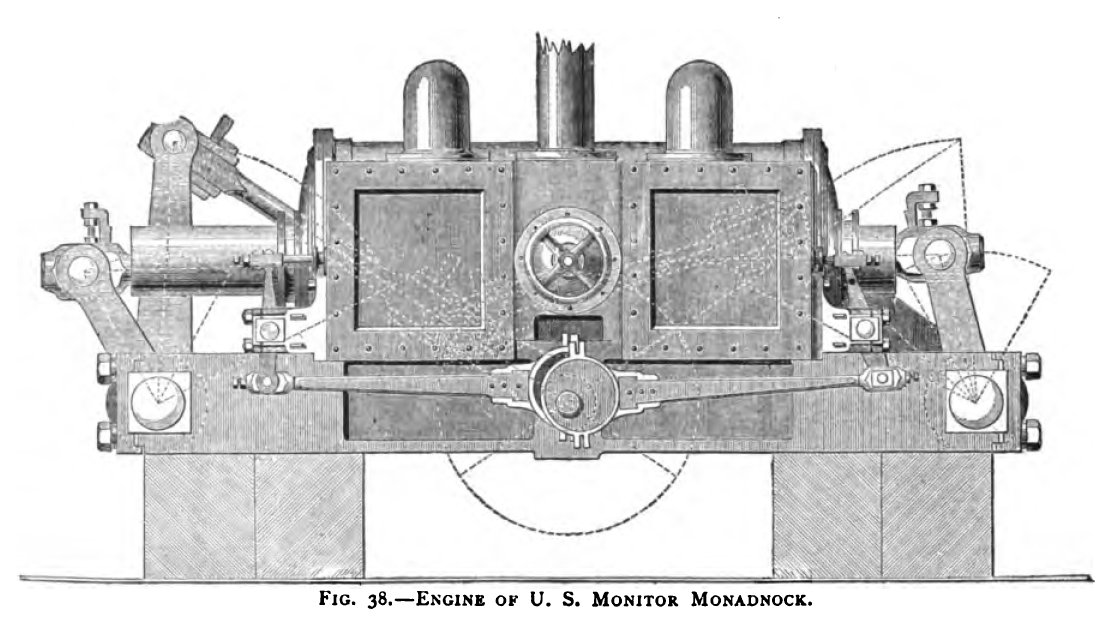
Vibrating-lever engine of USS Monadnock (1863) - front view

The vibrating-lever, or half-trunk engine, was a development of the conventional trunk engine conceived by Swedish-American engineer John Ericsson. Ericsson needed a small, low-profile engine like the trunk engine to power the U.S. Federal government's monitors, a type of warship developed during the American Civil War that had very little space for a conventional powerplant. The trunk engine itself was, however, unsuitable for this purpose, because the preponderance of weight was on the side of the engine that contained the cylinder and trunk—a problem that designers could not compensate for on the small monitor warships.

External videos
- Model vibrating-lever engine of USS Monitor in action

Ericsson resolved this problem by placing two horizontal cylinders back to back in the middle of the engine, working two "vibrating levers", one on each side, which by means of shafts and additional levers rotated a centrally located crankshaft. Vibrating-lever engines were later used in some other warships and merchant vessels, but their use was confined to ships built in the United States and in Ericsson's native country of Sweden, and as they had few advantages over more conventional engines, were soon supplanted by other types.

=== Back acting ===
The back-acting engine, also known as the return connecting rod engine, was another engine designed to have a very low profile. The back-acting engine was in effect a modified steeple engine, laid horizontally across the keel of a ship rather than standing vertically above it. Instead of the triangular crosshead assembly found in a typical steeple engine however, the back-acting engine generally used a set of two or more elongated, parallel piston rods terminating in a crosshead to perform the same function. The term "back-acting" or "return connecting rod" derives from the fact that the connecting rod "returns" or comes back from the side of the engine opposite the engine cylinder to rotate a centrally located crankshaft.

Back-acting engines were another type of engine popular in both warships and commercial vessels in the mid-19th century, but like many other engine types in this era of rapidly changing technology, they were eventually abandoned for other solutions. There is only one known surviving back-acting engine—that of the TV Emery Rice (formerly USS Ranger), now the centerpiece of a display at the American Merchant Marine Museum.

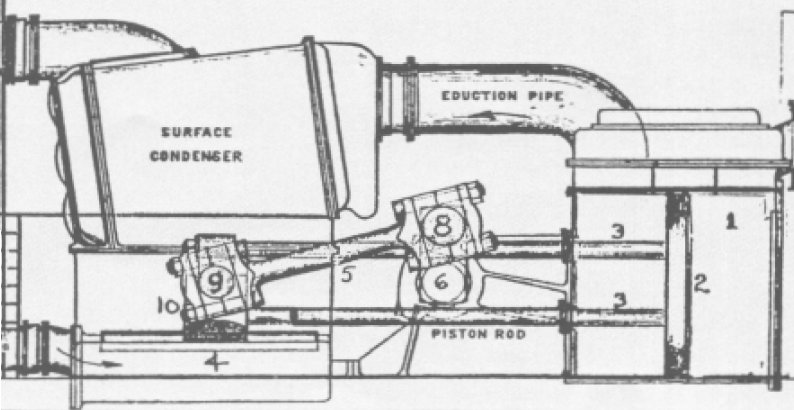
Diagram of back-acting engine of USS Ranger

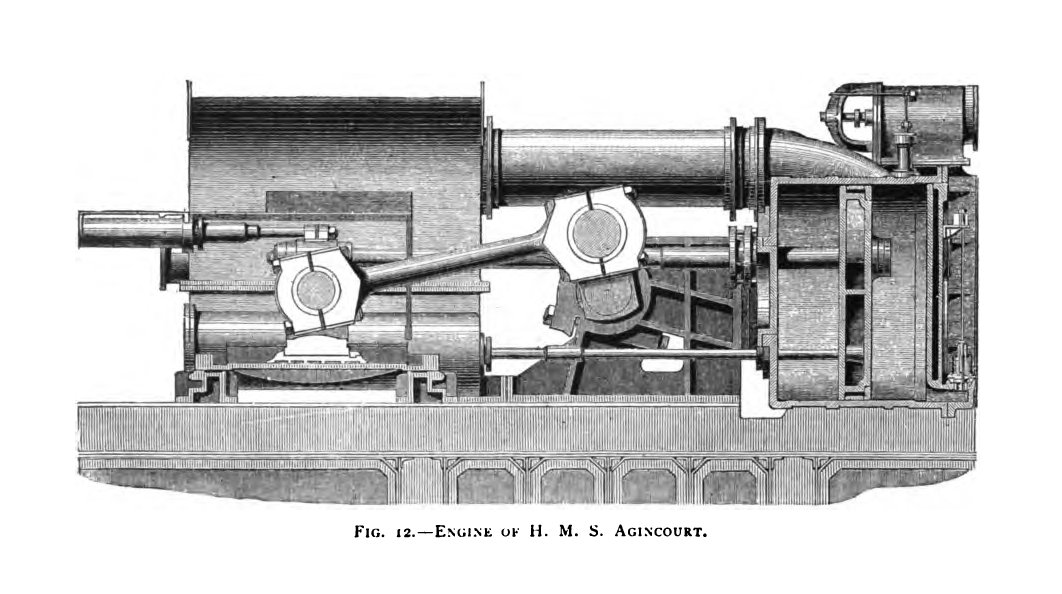
Return connecting rod engine of HMS Agincourt (1865)

=== Vertical ===
As steamships grew steadily in size and tonnage through the course of the 19th century, the need for low-profile, low-centre-of-gravity engines correspondingly declined. Freed increasingly from these design constraints, engineers were able to revert to simpler, more efficient and more easily maintained designs. The result was the growing dominance of the so-called "vertical" engine (more correctly known as the vertical inverted direct acting engine).

In this type of engine, the cylinders are located directly above the crankshaft, with the piston rod/connecting rod assemblies forming a more or less straight line between the two. The configuration is similar to that of a modern internal combustion engine (one notable difference being that the steam engine is double acting, see below, whereas almost all internal combustion engines generate power only in the downward stroke). Vertical engines are sometimes referred to as "hammer", "forge hammer" or "steam hammer" engines, due to their roughly similar appearance to another common 19th-century steam technology, the steam hammer.

Vertical engines came to supersede almost every other type of marine steam engine toward the close of the 19th century. Because they became so common, vertical engines are not usually referred to as such, but are instead referred to based upon their cylinder technology, i.e. as compound, triple-expansion, quadruple-expansion etc. The term "vertical" for this type of engine is imprecise, since technically any type of steam engine is "vertical" if the cylinder is vertically oriented. An engine someone describes as "vertical" might not be of the vertical inverted direct-acting type, unless they use the term "vertical" without qualification.

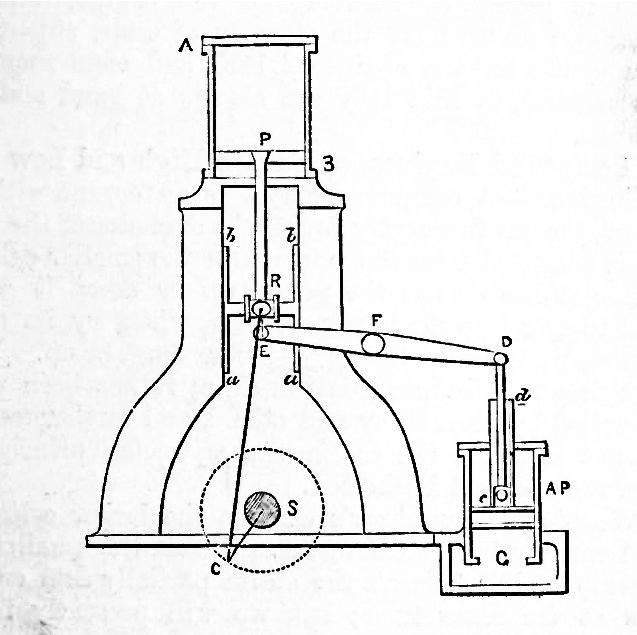
Diagram of a simple "hammer" engine

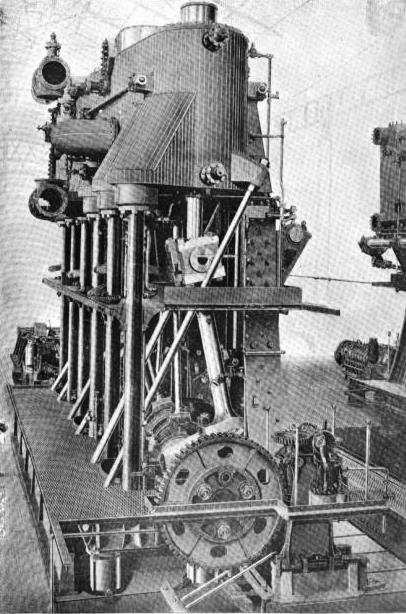
Vertical triple-expansion engine of USS Wisconsin (BB-9). The typical vertical engine arrangement of cylinder, piston rod, connecting rod and crankshaft can clearly be seen in this photo.

== Engines classified by cylinder technology ==
=== Simple expansion ===
A simple-expansion engine is a steam engine that expands the steam through only one stage, which is to say, all its cylinders are operated at the same pressure. Since this was by far the most common type of engine in the early period of marine engine development, the term "simple expansion" is rarely encountered. In the literature of the early period then, an engine can generally be assumed to be simple-expansion unless otherwise stated.

=== Compound ===
Compound engines were a method of improving efficiency. Until the development of compound engines, steam engines used the steam only once before it was recycled back to the boiler. A compound engine first recycles the steam into one or more larger, lower-pressure secondary cylinders, to use more of its heat energy. Compound engines could be configured to increase either a ship's economy or its speed. Broadly speaking, a compound engine can refer to a steam engine with any number of different-pressure cylinders—however, the term usually refers to engines that expand steam through only two stages, i.e., those that operate cylinders at only two different pressures (or "double-expansion" engines).

Note that a compound engine (including multiple-expansion engines, see below) can have more than one set of variable-pressure cylinders. For example, an engine might have two cylinders operating at pressure x and two operating at pressure y, or one cylinder operating at pressure x and three operating at pressure y. What makes it compound (or double-expansion) as opposed to multiple-expansion is that there are only two pressures, x and y.

The first compound engine believed to have been installed in a ship was that fitted to Henry Eckford by the American engineer James P. Allaire in 1824. However, many sources attribute the "invention" of the marine compound engine to Glasgow's John Elder in the 1850s. Elder made improvements to the compound engine that made it safe and economical for ocean-crossing voyages for the first time.

To fully realise their benefits, marine compound engines required boiler pressures higher than the limit imposed by the United Kingdom's Board of Trade, who would only allow 25 pounds per square inch (170 kPa). The shipowner and engineer Alfred Holt was able to persuade the authorisation of higher boiler pressures, launching SS Agamemnon in 1865, with boilers running at 60 psi (410 kPa). The combination of higher boiler pressures and a compound engine gave a significant increase in fuel efficiency, so allowing steamships to outcompete sail on the route from the UK to China, even before the opening of the Suez Canal in 1869.

=== Triple or multiple expansion ===
Animation of a typical vertical inverted triple-expansion engine. The engine is vertical because the cylinders work in the vertical plane, and inverted because the cylinders work a crankshaft below them rather than above.

A triple-expansion engine is a compound engine that expands the steam in three stages, e.g. an engine with three cylinders at three different pressures. A quadruple-expansion engine expands the steam in four stages. However, as explained above, the number of expansion stages defines the engine, not the number of cylinders, e.g. RMS Titanic had four-cylinder, triple-expansion engines. The first successful commercial use was an engine built at Govan in Scotland by Alexander C. Kirk for SS Aberdeen in 1881. An earlier experiment with an almost identical engine in SS Propontis in 1874 had had problems with the boilers. The initial installation, running at 150 psi (1,000 kPa) had to be replaced with a different design operating at only 90 psi (620 kPa). This was insufficient to fully realise the economic benefits of triple expansion. Aberdeen was fitted with two double-ended Scotch type steel boilers, running at 125 psi (860 kPa). These boilers had patent corrugated furnaces that overcame the competing problems of heat transfer and sufficient strength to deal with the boiler pressure. This provided the technical solution that ensured that virtually all newly built oceangoing steamships were fitted with triple-expansion engines within a few years of Aberdeen coming into service.

Multiple-expansion engine manufacture continued well into the 20th century. All 2,700 Liberty ships built by the United States during World War II were powered by triple-expansion engines, because the capacity of the US to manufacture marine steam turbines was entirely directed to the building of warships. The biggest manufacturer of triple-expansion engines during the war was the Joshua Hendy Iron Works. Toward the end of the war, turbine-powered Victory ships were manufactured in increasing numbers.

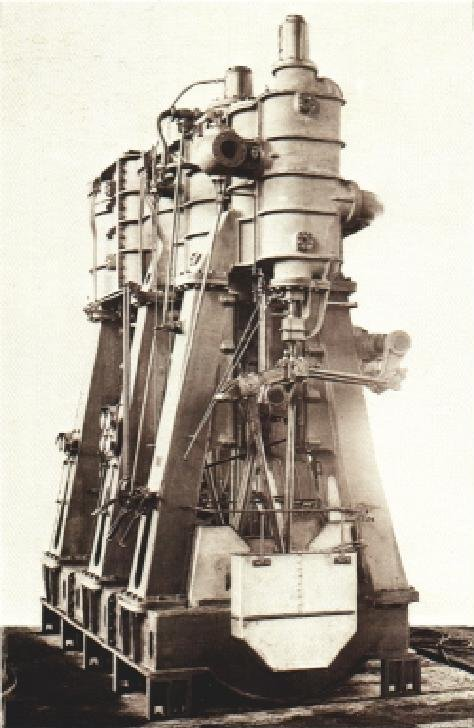
A Joshua Hendy triple-expansion engine

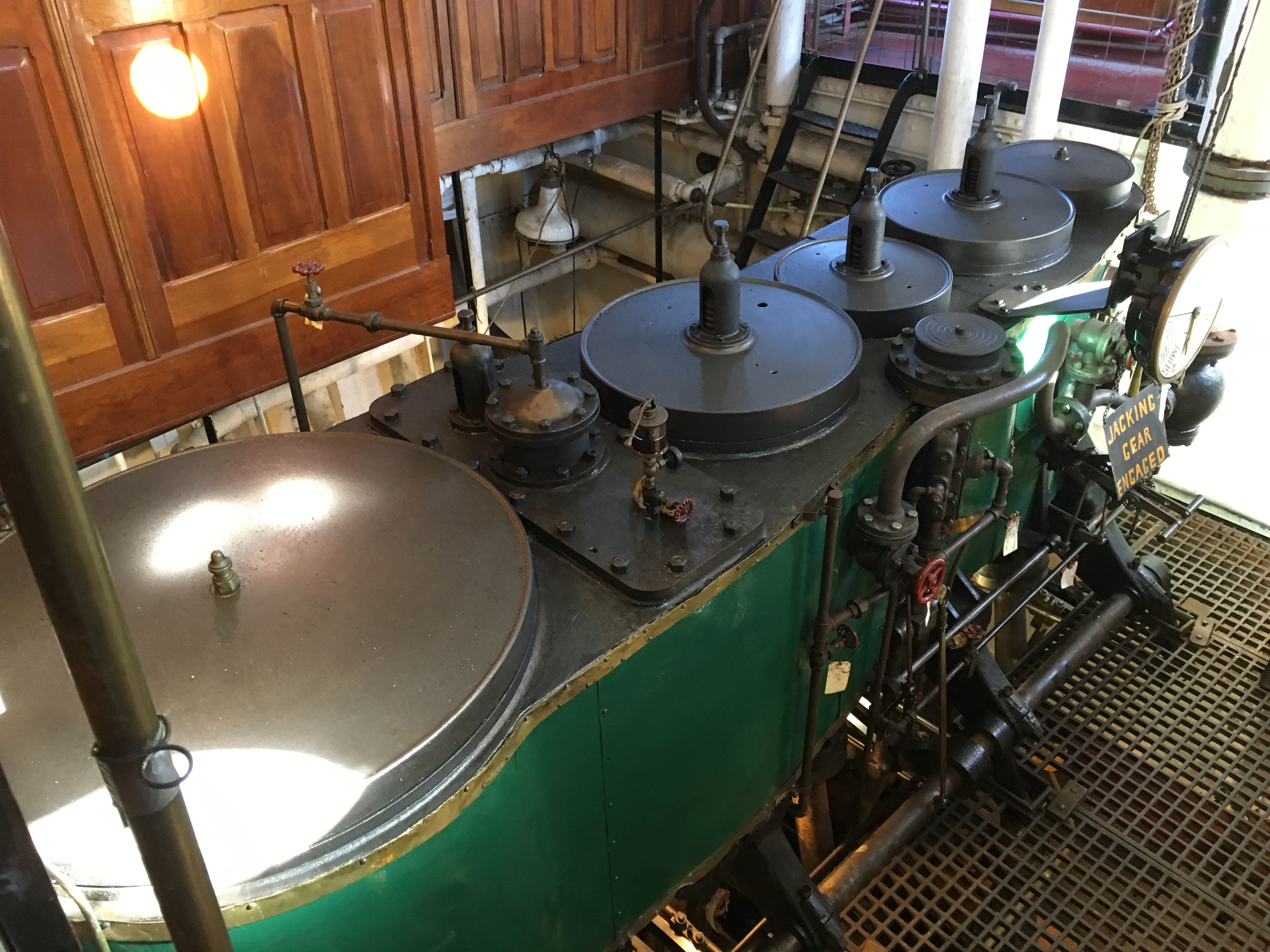
Top view of a triple-expansion engine on the 1907 oceangoing tug Hercules

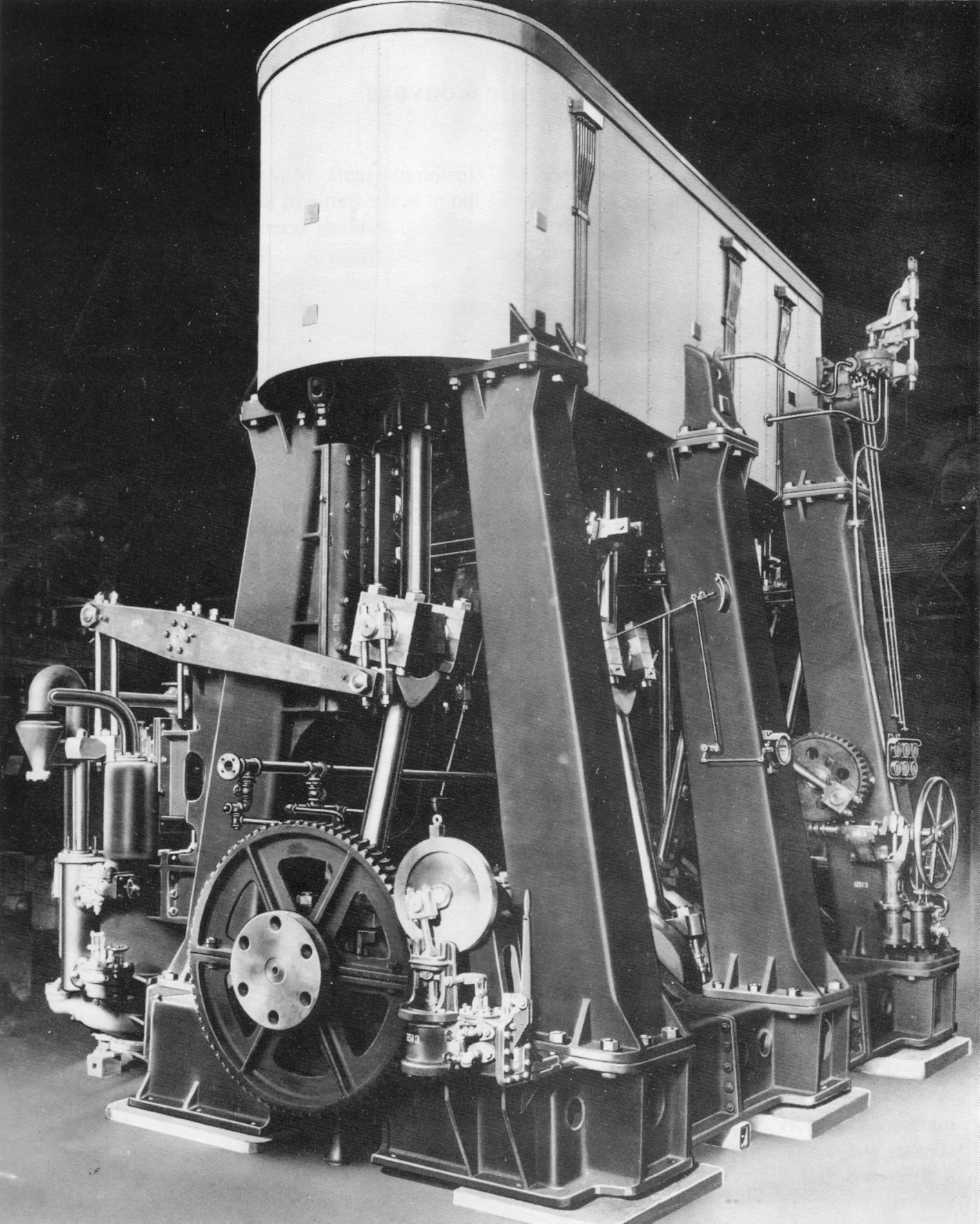
140-ton – also described as 135-ton – vertical triple-expansion engine of the type used to power World War II Liberty ships, assembled for testing prior to delivery. The engine is 21 feet (6.4 meters) long and 19 feet (5.8 meters) tall and was designed to operate at 76 rpm and propel a Liberty ship at about 11 kn (13 mph; 20 km/h).

=== Annular ===
An annular engine is an unusual type of engine that has an annular (ring-shaped) cylinder. Some of American pioneering engineer James P. Allaire's early compound engines were of the annular type, with a smaller, high-pressure cylinder placed in the centre of a larger, ring-shaped low-pressure cylinder. Trunk engines were another type of annular engine. A third type of annular marine engine used the Siamese engine connecting mechanism—but instead of two separate cylinders, it had a single, annular-shaped cylinder wrapped around the vertical arm of the crosshead (see diagram under "Siamese" above).

== Other terms ==
Some other terms are encountered in marine engine literature of the period. These terms, listed below, are usually used in conjunction with one or more of the basic engine classification terms listed above.

=== Simple ===
A simple engine is an engine that operates with single expansion of steam, regardless of the number of cylinders fitted to the engine. Up until about the mid-19th century, most ships had engines with only one cylinder, although some vessels had multiple-cylinder simple engines, and/or more than one engine.

=== Double-acting ===
A double-acting engine is an engine where steam is applied to both sides of the piston. Earlier steam engines applied steam in only one direction, allowing momentum or gravity to return the piston to its starting place, but a double-acting engine uses steam to force the piston in both directions, thus increasing rotational speed and power. Like the term "simple engine", the term "double-acting" is less frequently encountered in the literature since almost all marine engines were of the double-acting type.

=== Vertical, horizontal, inclined, inverted ===
These terms refer to the orientation of the engine cylinder. In a vertical cylinder, the piston moves in the vertical plane, with the piston rod emerging from the top of the cylinder to turn an overhead crankshaft. In a vertical inverted engine, the piston likewise moves in the vertical plane, but with the piston rod emerging from the bottom to turn a crankshaft beneath. With an inclined or horizontal type, the cylinder and piston are positioned at an incline or horizontally. An inclined inverted cylinder is a cylinder operating at a downward incline. These terms are all generally used in conjunction with the engine types above. Thus, one may have a horizontal trunk engine, or an inclined compound engine, etc.

Inclined and horizontal cylinders could be very useful in naval vessels as their orientation kept the engine profile as low as possible and thus less susceptible to damage. They could also be used in a low profile ship or to keep a ship's centre of gravity lower. In addition, inclined or horizontal cylinders had the advantage of reducing the amount of vibration by comparison with a vertical cylinder.

=== Geared ===
A geared engine or "geared screw" turns the propeller at a different rate to that of the engine. Early marine propeller engines were geared upward, which is to say the propeller was geared to run at a higher rotational speed than the engine itself ran at. As engines became faster and more powerful through the latter part of the 19th century, gearing was almost universally dispensed with, and the propeller ran at the same rotational speed as the engine. This direct drive arrangement is mechanically most efficient, and reciprocating steam engines are well suited to the rotational speed most efficient for screw propellers.

== See also ==
- Evaporator (marine) – apparatus for obtaining boiler feedwater from sea water
- Guardian valve
- Steam boat
- Steam engine
