= FEFC =

FEFC may refer to:

- Further Education Funding Council for England
- The Fellowship of Foursquare Churches in Europe
- Far Eastern Freight Conference, an Asia-Europe organization of shippers operating on specific routes, a multi-national shipping cartel established in 1879 and dissolved in 2008
