= John Kidston Swire =

British businessman (1893–1983)

- Born: 1893
- Died: 22 February 1983 (aged 89–90)
- Education: Eton College
- Alma mater: University College, Oxford
- Occupation: Businessman
- Known for: Former Chairman of Swire Group
- Spouse: Juliet Richenda Barclay
- Children: 4, including John Anthony Swire and Adrian Swire
- Relatives: John Samuel Swire (grandfather); Barnaby Swire (grandson)

John Kidston "Jock" Swire (1893–22 February 1983), was a British businessman, chairman of Swire Group from 1946 to 1966.

== Early life ==
He was the son of John Swire of Hubbard's Hall, Harlow, Essex, and grandson of John Samuel Swire. He was educated at Eton College, and University College, Oxford.

== Career ==
John Kidston Swire became a director of Swire Group in 1920, and was chairman from 1946 to 1966.

== Personal life ==
In 1923, he married Juliet Richenda Barclay, the daughter of Theodore Barclay of Fanshaws, Hertford. They had four children:

- Bridget Swire (1924–2009)
- Sir John Swire (1927–2016)
- Sir Adrian Swire (1932–2018)
- Gillian Swire; married Hon. Julian Fane, son of Vere Fane, 14th Earl of Westmorland.

== Death ==
He died in 1983.
