= Halep =

Halep may refer to:

- A variant of the name of Aleppo, a city in northern Syria
- Halep, an Ottoman Turkish ferry, troopship and hospital ship, torpedoed in 1915
- Dimciu Halep (born 2000), Romanian football player; see 2019–20 FC Viitorul Constanța season
- Simona Halep (born 1991), Romanian tennis player
