= Adrian Swire =

British heir and businessman (1932–2018)

Sir Adrian Swire AE DL
- Born: Adrian Christopher Swire; 15 February 1932; Marylebone, London, England
- Died: 24 August 2018 (aged 86); London, England
- Education: Wellesley House School; Eton College
- Alma mater: University College, Oxford
- Spouse(s): Judith Compton, Lady Swire
- Children: Merlin Swire; Samuel Swire; Martha Swire
- Parent: John Kidston Swire
- Relatives: John Samuel Swire (great-grandfather); John Anthony Swire (brother); Barnaby Swire (nephew)

Sir Adrian Christopher Swire AE DL (15 February 1932 – 24 August 2018) was a billionaire British heir and businessman. He was the former chairman of John Swire & Sons Ltd. In April 2015, the Swire family's net worth was estimated at £2.4 billion.

== Early life ==
Adrian Swire was born on 15 February 1932, grew up at Hubbards Hall near Harlow, and was educated at Wellesley House School, Eton and University College, Oxford. During his national service, he served in the Coldstream Guards.

== Career ==
Swire started his career for a subsidiary of the family business, Butterfield & Swire Far East, in 1956 before returning to run the London operations office in 1961. He was president of the General Council of British Shipping from 1980 to 1981.

He was the chairman of John Swire & Sons from 1987 to 1997, and from 2002 to 2004. He was on the board of directors of Cathay Pacific, an airline partially owned by the family business, from 1965 to 2005.

== Honours ==
Swire was made a Knight Bachelor in the 1982 New Year Honours.

== Personal life ==
He was married to Lady Judith Compton, the daughter of William Bingham Compton, 6th Marquess of Northampton. They had three children, Martha, Merlin and Samuel. The family lived at Sparsholt Manor, near Wantage.

He was a keen amateur pilot, serving as a member of the Royal Hong Kong Auxiliary Air Force. From 1995 to 2004, he was Pro-Chancellor of Southampton University.

He was a member of White's, Brooks's, Pratt's and the Hong Kong Club.
