= John Anthony Swire =

British businessman (1927–2016)

Sir John Swire CBE KStJ
- Born: John Anthony Swire; 28 February 1927; Marylebone, London, England
- Died: 28 November 2016 (aged 89); Selling, Kent
- Education: Eton College; University of Oxford
- Occupation: Businessman
- Children: Barnaby Swire, Jonathan Swire
- Parent: John Kidston Swire
- Relatives: John Samuel Swire (great-grandfather); Adrian Swire (brother)

Sir John Anthony Swire CBE KStJ (28 February 1927 – 28 November 2016) was a British businessman.

== Early life ==
On 28 February 1927 Swire was born in London, England. Swire's father was John Kidston "Jock" Swire.

== Education ==
Sir John Anthony Swire was educated at Eton College and the University of Oxford.

== Career ==
Swire served in the Irish Guards from 1945 to 1948, both in the UK and in Israel.

Swire started his career at Butterfield & Swire, a subsidiary of the Swire Group in Hong Kong, in 1950. He served on the Board of Directors of John Swire & Sons Ltd from 1955 to 1997, as its Chairman from 1966 to 1987, and Honorary President from 1987 to 1997. He became its Life President in 1997.

Swire served on the Boards of Directors of British Bank of the Middle East, Ocean Transport & Trading, James Finlay & Co, and Shell Transport & Trading Co. He served on the London Advisory Committee of The Hongkong and Shanghai Banking Corporation from 1969 to 1989.

He became a Commander of the Most Excellent Order of the British Empire in 1977. He was an Honorary Fellow of St Antony's College, Oxford in 1987 and received an honorary Doctor of Laws from the University of Hong Kong in 1989. He was knighted in the 1990 New Year Honours. He served on the Advisory Council of the Stanford Graduate School of Business from 1981 to 1990. He then served as the Deputy pro-Chancellor of the University of Kent from 1993 to 1999. He was a member of the Worshipful Company of Fishmongers.

== Personal life ==
Swire died on 28 November 2016 at the age of 89.
