= Samuel Swire (businessman) =

British businessman (born 1980)

- Born: March 1980 (age 46)
- Education: University College, Oxford
- Occupation: Businessman
- Parent(s): Sir Adrian Swire; Judith Compton
- Relatives: Merlin Swire (brother); Barnaby Swire (cousin)

Samuel Compton Swire (born March 1980) is a British businessman.

== Early life ==
Samuel Compton Swire was born in March 1980. His late father, Sir Adrian Swire, was a billionaire heir and former chairman of the Swire Group. His mother is Lady Judith Compton, daughter of William Compton, 6th Marquess of Northampton. He has a brother, Merlin Swire.

He graduated from University College, Oxford in 2003, where he studied history.

== Career ==
Swire started his career at the family business, the Swire Group, in 2003. He has worked for them in Hong Kong, Singapore, China, Sri Lanka and London.

Swire has served on the board of directors of John Swire & Sons Ltd since January 2015. In 2019, Swire became chairman of Swire Shipping and Swire Bulk. From 2015 to 2023 he was a director of both Swire Pacific and Cathay Pacific Airways.

Swire is chairman of the Swire Charitable Trust and the Swire Chinese Language Foundation and has been a trustee of the Historic England Foundation since 2021. He was a trustee of The Mission to Seafarers from 2016 to 2025.
