= Swire Resources =

Hong Kong retail company

- Industry: Sports apparel, shoes
- Founded: 1990; 36 years ago in Hong Kong
- Headquarters: Kingston International Centre; Kowloon Bay, Kowloon; Hong Kong
- Number of locations: 204 (2019)
- Parent: Swire Pacific
- Website: swire-resources.com

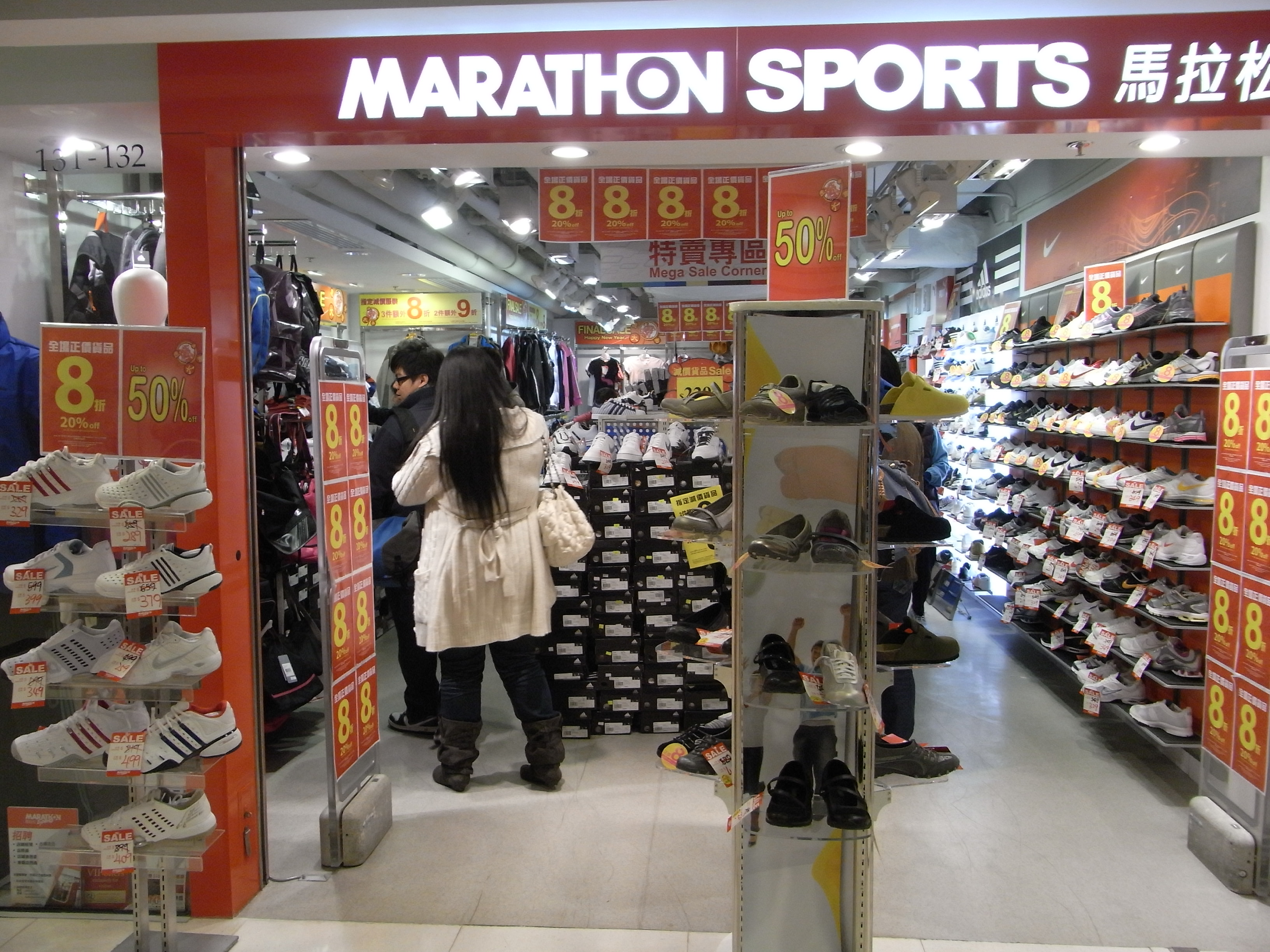
Marathon Sports shop in Kowloon City Plaza

Swire Resources (Chinese: 太古資源) is a Hong Kong retail company specialising in sports apparel, swimwear, and footwear. It is a wholly owned subsidiary of Swire Pacific, itself a subsidiary of Swire Group.

== History ==
The company was founded by the Swire Group in 1990. It absorbed some of the businesses held by Swire's other trading arm, Swire Loxley. Swire Loxley was later sold, in 2000, to Dah Chong Hong.

In 1984, Swire Loxley had purchased Marathon Sports, a local Hong Kong sports store founded in the 1970s. This chain was transferred to Swire Resources.

Swire Resources began serving as the exclusive distributor of Columbia Sportswear in Hong Kong and Macau in 2002, and in Mainland China in 2004.

In 2014, Swire Resources established a joint venture with Columbia Sportswear. The joint venture company, Columbia Sportswear Commercial (Shanghai) Company, was headquartered in Shanghai. In 2019, Columbia bought out Swire Resource's 40 per cent stake in the joint venture company. However, Swire Resources remains the sole Hong Kong and Macau distributor of the brand.

== Retail stores ==
In December 2019, Swire Resources operated 191 retail outlets in Hong Kong and Macau, and 13 in Mainland China. It owns four multi-brand chain stores, namely:

- Gigasports, a chain of large-format footwear and sportswear stores
- Marathon Sports, which are smaller-format sportswear shops
- Catalog, a chain of youth-oriented sports shoe and apparel shops
- Go Wild, which specialises in outdoors wear

== Brands ==
The company is the Hong Kong distributor for several major international brands, including Aldo, Arena, Columbia Sportswear, Crocs, Rockport, and Speedo.
