= Christopher Dale Pratt =

Businessman

- Born: May 27, 1956
- Occupations: Chairman and executive director
- Employer(s): Cathay Pacific; Swire Pacific
- Awards: CBE

Christopher Dale Pratt (Chinese: 白紀圖; born May 27, 1956), CBE, was the chairman and executive director of Cathay Pacific Airways Limited and Swire Pacific Limited.

== Background ==
Christopher Dale Pratt joined the John Swire & Sons Limited in 1978 and had worked with the group in Hong Kong, as well as Australia and Papua New Guinea. He was the chairman and executive director of Cathay Pacific and Swire Pacific, and had held the position from 1 February 2006; following the sudden resignation of David Turnbull, less than a year after he succeeded James W. J. Hughes-Hallett. Pratt was also the chairman of Hong Kong Aircraft Engineering Company Limited (HAECO), John Swire & Sons (H.K.) Limited, Swire Beverages Limited and Swire Properties Limited, and a director of Air China Limited and The Hongkong and Shanghai Banking Corporation Limited. Pratt retired from the Swire group in March 2014.

Pratt served as the executive director of the Swire Pacific's Trading and Industrial Division between 2000 and 2005. In addition, he served as a director of Steamships Trading Company Limited from 1995 and became the chairman in 2000, and continued to serve until his retirement from the company on 27 February 2006.

=== Education ===
Pratt has an honours degree in modern history from the University of Oxford.

=== Awards and honours ===
Pratt is awarded the Commander of the Order of the British Empire (CBE) (Civil Division) in the 2000 New Year Honours for his services to the community in Papua New Guinea.

== See also ==
- Cathay Pacific
- Swire Group
