= Chris Prat =

Canadian lacrosse player

Chris Prat is a Canadian former indoor lacrosse player in the National Lacrosse League. He last played for the Colorado Mammoth in 2005. Prat is noted for contributing to his former team, the Victoria Shamrocks, winning two Mann cups in 1997 and 1999. He is recognized as an accomplished athlete, as he was inducted into the Canadian Lacrosse Hall of Fame in 2011.

== Statistics ==
=== NLL ===
		Regular Season						Playoffs
Season	Team	GP	G	A	Pts	LB	PIM	GP	G	A	Pts	LB	PIM
1998	Syracuse	12	18	38	56	58	30	--	--	--	--	--	--
1999	Syracuse	8	14	9	23	42	10	--	--	--	--	--	--
2000	Buffalo	12	20	15	35	64	14	1	3	1	4	5	0
2002	Calgary	4	1	6	7	23	36	--	--	--	--	--	--
2002	Vancouver	12	24	43	67	56	11	1	1	2	3	3	0
2003	Vancouver	16	30	33	63	50	19	1	2	4	6	3	2
2004	Vancouver	12	12	15	27	32	43	--	--	--	--	--	--
2005	Colorado	9	9	12	21	31	20	0	0	0	0	0	0
Totals		85	128	171	299	356	183	3	6	7	13	11	2
