= Far Eastern Freight Conference =

Shipping industry cartel

The Far Eastern Freight Conference was a co-operative agreement between a group of steamship owners and shipbrokers involved in scheduled cargo liner services principally between China and Japan, and European ports. It was established in 1879 as the China and Japan Conference through the efforts of John Swire. They co-operated in order to overcome excess capacity of steamers in that trade. Described by some as a cartel, the conference rewarded shippers that gave all their business to ships owned by conference members through a system of deferred rebates to the freight rates charged. These discounts were deferred for, typically, six months and were not payable if the shipper used a ship outside the conference in that time. Capacity was controlled by limiting each member to an agreed number of sailings during the year. The conference survived a legal challenge in 1885, which went to the High Court in 1887, then through the Court of Appeal and ultimately to the House of Lords: the conference won at every level. There were later challenges and inquiries, which the conference survived. Ultimately, changes to the European Union exemption of shipping conferences from their competition regulations brought the conference to an end in October 2008.

== Background ==
Until the second half of the 1860s, virtually all cargoes between China and Europe were carried on sailing vessels. Whilst steamships were in use for passenger and mail services – the latter often providing an essential subsidy – the marine engineering technology of the day did not provide a steamship for long-distance routes with sufficient fuel economy to carry the coal it needed as fuel together with a commercial cargo. The main goods shipped from China were tea and silk. These were high value cargoes that were usually carried in sailing clippers.

A steam passenger, mail and light freight service was started by P&O to India and the far east in 1841, using the Mediterranean and an overland connection from Alexandria to Suez. In 1844 this service went as far as Hong Kong. Initially this was monthly, then fortnightly from 1853. It took 41 days for mail to get from London to Singapore. All other traffic sailed round the southern end of Africa on its way to and from China.

Agamemnon was the first steamship to achieve the fuel economy necessary to trade between China and Britain. Her maiden voyage in 1866 proved the success of Alfred Holt's design and his Ocean Steamship Company added two sister ships on the same route by the next year. In 1869, the Suez Canal opened. The distance saving of over 3,000 nautical miles (5,600 km; 3,500 mi) gave a further advantage to steamers, as the canal was not a practical option for sailing vessels. Their early success prompted a building boom, with 45 steamers being built on the Clyde in 1871 specifically for far eastern trade. (Note: The distance by a modern shipping route calculator is 13,373 nautical miles (24,767 km; 15,389 mi) from London to Fuzhou via the Cape of Good Hope. Using the same calculator, a route through the Mediterranean and Suez Canal is 10,124 nautical miles (18,750 km; 11,650 mi). The difference is 3,249 nautical miles (6,017 km; 3,739 mi). A sailing vessel would take a longer route to obtain the best winds, so this comparison is only an approximation.) The result of this was that there was more steamship capacity than was needed to meet market demand. Unlike sailing ships, which had much lower costs and could afford to wait for the next cargo, steamers needed to be in work, but freight rates had fallen significantly due to overcapacity. Other problems were the seasonal nature of demand in China (tea was a seasonal crop) and the imbalance between outward (i.e. to China) and homeward (to Europe) cargoes. Until 1881, there was more homeward than outward cargo. The solution that was suggested by John Swire to this problem was a "combination" of ship owners.

== First years ==
John Swire was the far eastern agent for Holt's Ocean Steamship Company. He saw that if the scheduled steamship services did nothing, their competition would "ruin each other". (Note: As an illustration of the fall in freights, in 1870, the outward freight for a steamer via the Suez Canal to Hong Kong was 70 shillings (£3.50) per ton, compared with the 1878 freight of 20 shillings (£1.00)) Swire was able to persuade the following to sign up to the first agreement in 1879:

- P&O
- the Ocean Steamship Company, (Alfred Holt)
- Compagnie des Messageries Imperiales
- Castle Shipping Line (T Skinner & Co)
- Glen Line (McGregor Gow & Co)
- Shire line (D J Jenkins & Co)
- Gellatly, Hankey, Sewell & Co (shipbroker)
- Norris & Joiner (shipbroker, on behalf of shipowners Wm. Thomson & Co., also known as the Ben Line )
- Shaw Williams & Co

The first year's agreement rationed out the number of sailings each participant could have during the year. A schedule of freight rates was agreed, but if a non-conference ship was competing at less than those rates, the conference members were to cut their rates to match this, and the resulting income deficit was shared between all members of the conference on a pro rata basis.

It was intended that shippers would be attracted to conference ships because it gave them a predictable service, without big fluctuations in freight charges. To encourage shippers, they were offered rebates to the freight charges paid if they exclusively used conference ships. These rebates were paid in arrears every six months.

== Expansion ==
The conference extended its geographical scope in 1897 by including cargoes from Penang and Singapore, with Swire successfully negotiating a Straits Conference. This was particularly useful for the Ocean Steamship Company, whose ships could fill empty cargo space with extra stops on a homeward voyage.

Membership of the conference expanded beyond the founding participants, (though the Castle Line ceased membership after a few years). By 1901 the Straits Conference – and presumably the parent far eastern conference – had 23 shipping lines listed in its members, representing the merchant marine of ten different countries. The split of nationalities was six British, three German, six French, one Austrian, one Japanese, one Danish, one Spanish, two Russian, one Italian and one Dutch.

In the period after World War II more members were admitted, including shipping companies from developing countries. This gave a total of 32 shipping lines from 21 different countries.

== The Mogul case ==
An early threat to the conference was from steamers involved in the triangular trade: outward to Australia, a second leg, usually carrying New South Wales coal, to China, then tea back to Britain. This overcame a problem with low outward rates to China (and also the shortages of cargoes back from Australia for much of the year). It was a commercial strategy that had been employed by some of the later tea clippers, such as the Aberdeen Line's Thermopylae. Steamers, which could make two round trips a year, were able to alternate between homeward trips from Australia, with wool, and China, carrying tea. This was more profitable than simply sailing to and from China.

The shipbrokers Gellatly moved into ship owning in 1883 with the formation of the Mogul Steamship Company and operated ships on this triangular route. The Aberdeen Line's first (and highly fuel efficient) steamer Aberdeen started on this route in 1882. Swire challenged Gellatly over their undercutting of conference rates in 1882 at a meeting in 1885 when Mogul were seeking, unsuccessfully, to charter two ships through the conference. Gellatly responded with a threat that if his company did not have access to the conference, three Mogul steamers, Aberdeen (Note: It is not clear if he had authority to speak on behalf of the Aberdeen Line at the time.) and others would sail to Hankou to undercut the conference rates. Gellatly expressed the view that whilst this would cost him some thousands of pounds, the conference members' losses would be substantially greater.

Gellatly's threat was carried out, with Mogul's Pathan and Afghan, together with Aberdeen, loading full cargoes of tea at 25 shillings (£1.25) per ton in June 1885. Conference ships (other than the express steamers taking the first of the crop) loaded at between 45 shillings (£2.25) and 30 shillings (£3.50). The conference agents in China, in May 1885, had reminded shippers of the conference terms that would cause them to lose their 5% rebate if they used non-conference ships.

The result of this was that Gellatly tried to take out an injunction against the conference in August. When this failed, in 1887 he went to the High Court, alleging that the conference was seeking to prevent Mogul from trading. Gellatly did not succeed, so he took the case to the Court of Appeal, where he lost again. He then went to the highest court of appeal, the House of Lords, losing his case for the third time in December 1891.

Gellatly and the Mogul Steamship Company somehow ended their dispute with the conference and became members again. The Aberdeen Line ceased to sail to China after 1889 and concentrated on trade to and from Australia, with some added stops in Cape Town.

== Further challenges ==
The decision of England's highest court on the Mogul case gave a legal basis for the conference for more than a hundred years. There were other investigations into criticism of the anti-competitive nature of the conference, including the Straits Settlements Commission (in 1902) (following expansion of the conference to include cargoes from Singapore) and a Royal Commission published in 1909. These allowed the conference to continue its activities. The Royal Commission's supportive attitude was a surprise to those who complained about the anti-competitive aspects. A minority report by the Royal Commission suggested that shippers should form associations to collectively represent their position to the conference. Such associations were not actually set up until after World War II.

In 1911, a rebate paid specifically to seven Singapore freight agents was challenged and had to cease. The Singapore legislature re-examined the overall validity of the conference with a report in 1934. This found that the activities of the conference to be largely beneficial, stating that the for homeward trade "the Conference is generally admitted to be advantageous for the colony". An investigation into the British shipping industry, the Rochdale Committee of 1970, provided additional confirmation of the operations of the conference.

The European Union had exemptions for shipping conferences from their competition regulations, but these rules were changed in 2006. This was put into effect on 17 October 2008, when the Far Eastern Freight Conference ceased operations. Critics of that decision (in 2015) have taken the view that competition has not produced benefits and that price fluctuation is a serious problem for shippers: a return to the banned conference is suggested as a solution by these critics.
