= Guardian valve =

Valve used in marine steam turbine propulsion plants

A guardian valve is a valve used in marine steam turbine propulsion plants to prevent steam from leaking into the astern turbine while the vessel is operating in the ahead mode. It is normally installed between the astern throttle valve and the astern elements of the low pressure (LP) turbine. Typically only the LP turbine of a steam ship's propulsion plant has reversing blade elements. Steam leaking in such a manner would result in a loss of efficiency and possibly overheat and damage the turbine blades.

The guardian valve must be opened prior to any maneuvering situation, in order to permit the astern turbine to be used to bring the vessel to a rapid stop or to back down.

Any similar arrangement of a stop valve used to protect leaking past a throttling valve could also be referred to as a guardian valve.
