= Taikoo Sugar Refinery =

Former sugar refinery in China

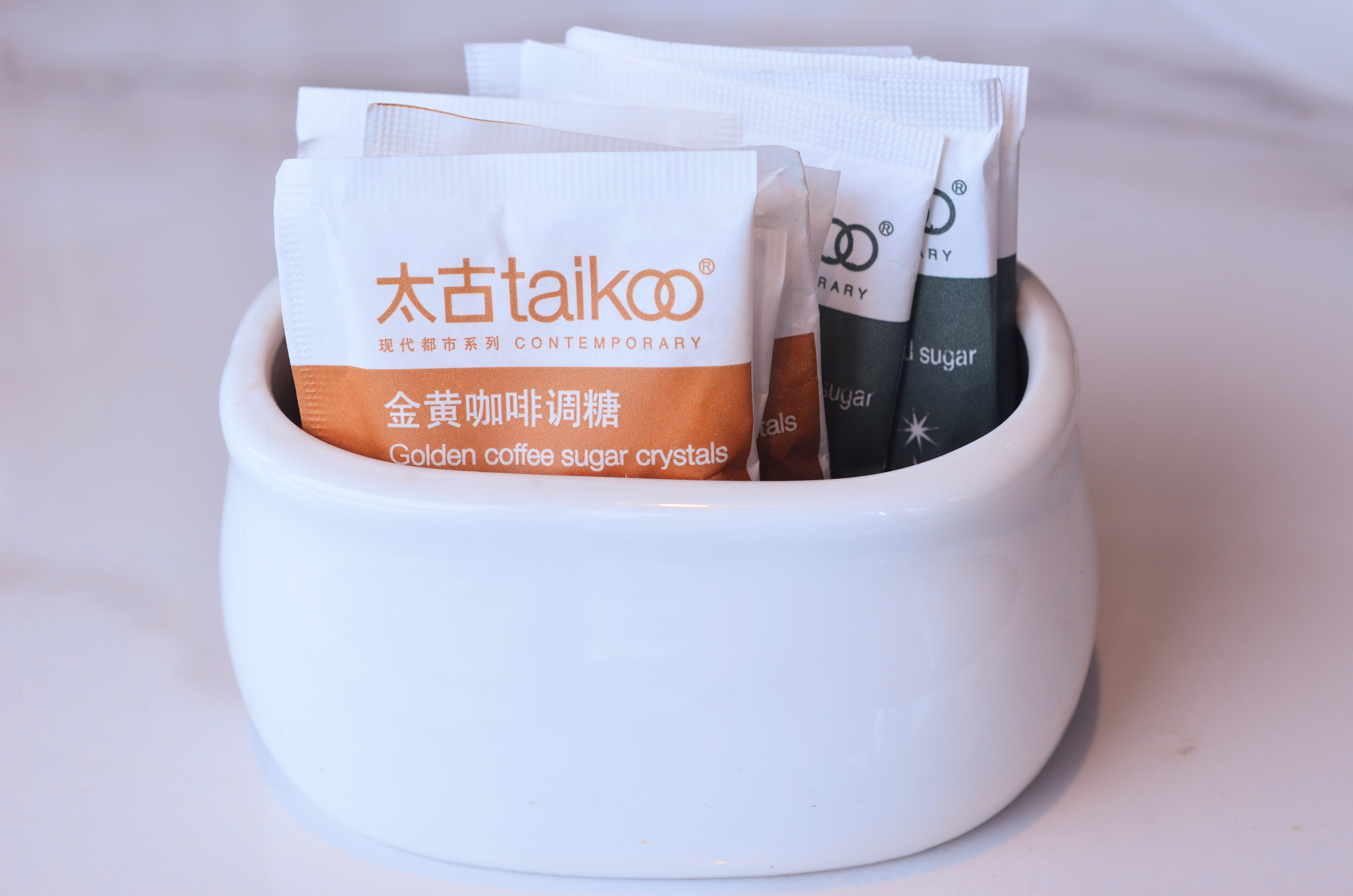
- Taikoo Sugar
- Formation: June 1881
- Founder: John Samuel Swire
- Legal status: Company
- Headquarters: Hong Kong
- Products: Sugar

Taikoo Sugar Refinery is a sugar importer and former sugar refinery in Hong Kong.

== History ==
Taikoo Sugar Refinery was established by John Samuel Swire in June 1881 after a thorough investigation into the feasibility and openings for a new refinery in China. His determination to build the largest and most up-to-date plant was initially stimulated by a period of intense rivalry with Jardine, Matheson & Company who already owned a refinery. A site for the refinery was selected at Quarry Bay, Hong Kong and the capital for the venture was put up chiefly by John Samuel Swire himself, Holt's James Barrow, H J Butterfield, Messrs. Ismay and Imrie, W J Thompson and R N Dale.

Taikoo Sugar Refinery at Quarry Bay began operations in 1884.

John Swire & Sons were appointed Managers and Butterfield and Swire, Hong Kong, were responsible for the overall management and, as General Agents, for the purchase of raw sugars and the selling and distribution of the finished products. China was always the chief market but Australia, Japan and India were also important at different times.

The Taikoo Sugar Refinery (TSR) faced stiff competition from Jardine Matheson & Company in its early years but, by the 1920s, the Japanese had become their greatest competitors. An up-country marketing system was established to counter this and to expand TSR markets in inland China, as well as efforts to widen the Far Eastern areas served by TSR.

The 1920s was a period of constant difficulties - a strike in 1923, poor markets in 1924 and a three-month boycott in 1925. 1925, however, also saw the expansion of the Taikoo Sugar Refinery into the largest single unit refinery in the world. In December 1941, Hong Kong fell to the Japanese and production was halted until the plant was returned to John Swire & Sons in the autumn of 1945.

== Modern times ==
Taikoo's sugar refining activity appears to have ceased around 1970 and the company is now a major sugar importer. The site of the refinery has redeveloped into Taikoo Place, a commercial building complex.

== See also ==
- Mount Parker Cable Car
- Taikoo Place
