= Barnaby Swire =

British billionaire businessman (born 1964)

- Born: January 1964 (age 62)
- Education: Eton College
- Alma mater: University College, Oxford
- Occupation: Businessman
- Known for: Chairman of Swire Group
- Children: 4
- Relatives: Sir John Anthony Swire (father), Sir Adrian Swire (uncle) Merlin Swire (cousin) Samuel Swire (cousin) Samuel Swire (cousin)

Barnaby Nicholas Swire (born January 1964) is a British billionaire businessman. He is the Chairman of the Swire Group.

== Early life ==
Barnaby Swire was born in January 1964. He was educated at Eton College. He is a son of the late Sir John Anthony Swire, chairman of the Swire Group between 1966 and 1987 and life president of John Swire & Sons Ltd. He studied history and modern languages at University College, Oxford, leaving in 1985.

== Career ==
Swire started his career at the family business, John Swire & Sons, in 1985. He worked for them in Hong Kong, Papua New Guinea and Japan. He transferred to London in 1994, where he continued to work for the Swire Group. He served on the board of directors of Lewmar Marine.

He has served as the chairman of the Swire Group since the end of 2014, when he replaced James Hughes-Hallett. He was chairman of The China Navigation Company, until 2019.

Following his father's death in November 2016, in 2017 the Sunday times estimated his net worth at £2.15 billion.

== Personal life ==
He is married and has four children. They reside in Kent.

Swire is a significant donor to the Conservative Party.
