= SS Aberdeen (1881) =

British cargo liner

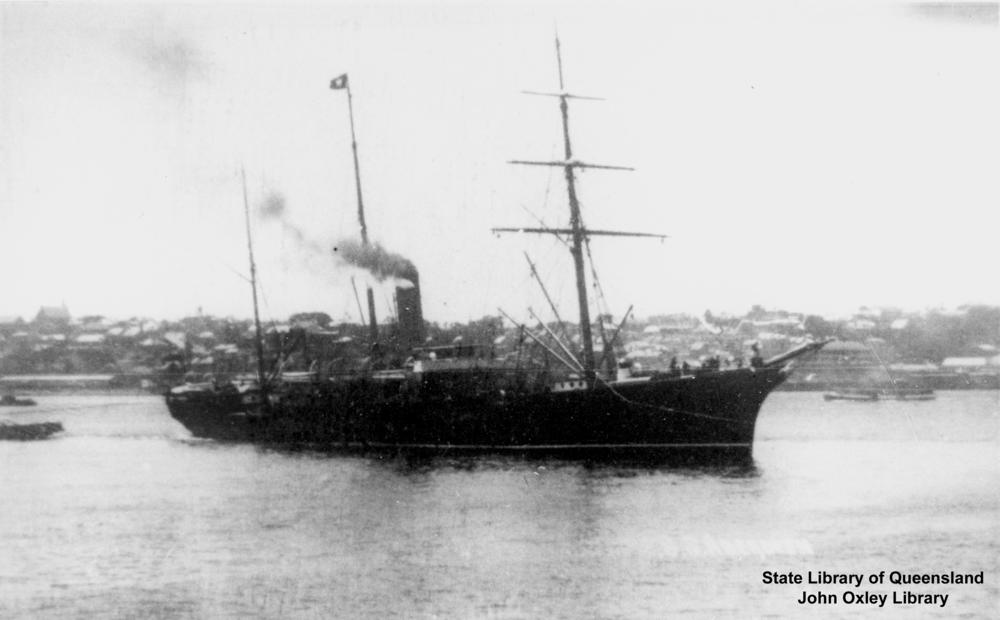
- SS Aberdeen

History

United Kingdom
- Name: Aberdeen
- Namesake: Aberdeen
- Builder: Robert Napier and Sons, Govan, Scotland
- Launched: 21 December 1881
- Commissioned: 30 March 1882
- Fate: Sold to the Ottoman government

Ottoman Empire
- Name: Halep
- Namesake: Vilayet of Aleppo (Halep)
- Acquired: 1906
- Fate: Torpedoed 25 August 1915

General characteristics
- Type: Cargo liner
- Tonnage: 3,616 GRT
- Length: 362.4 feet
- Beam: 44.3 feet
- Propulsion: Triple expansion steam engine, single screw
- Speed: 13 knots
- Capacity: 12 first class passengers and (outward voyage only) 450 third class passengers

SS Aberdeen was a British cargo liner completed in 1882. She was designed for service from London to Australia, and was the first ship to be successfully powered by a triple expansion steam engine. The triple expansion engine very quickly became the standard choice for the entire industry, with its predecessor, the two cylindered compound engine virtually ceasing to be built by 1885. The fuel economy achieved meant that steam propulsion was able to outcompete sail on all major commercial routes.

Aberdeen was sold in 1906 to the Ottoman government and renamed Halep. She served as a Turkish troopship in World War I before being sunk by a British submarine in 1915.

== Design and construction ==
Aberdeen was designed as the first steamship in the fleet of the Aberdeen Line, intended for high speed service between the United Kingdom, Australia, and the Far East. She was launched at Govan in the shipyard of Robert Napier and Sons on Clydeside, Scotland on 21 December 1881. The senior partner at Napier's was Alexander Carnegie Kirk, a talented engineer who had experimentally fitted the world's first marine "triple expansion" compound steam engine on the SS Propontis in 1874. Triple expansion engines required much higher boiler pressures than was readily available from the contemporary technology, and Propontis had boiler problems from the outset. (Note: Propontis was initially fitted with water-tube boilers) 150 pounds per square inch (1,000 kPa) had been the planned boiler pressure, but the replacement boilers that had to be fitted could only achieve 90 pounds per square inch (620 kPa).

Aberdeen was fitted with two double ended Scotch type steel boilers, running at 125 pounds per square inch (860 kPa). These boilers had patent corrugated furnaces that overcame the competing problems of heat transfer and sufficient strength to deal with the boiler pressure. This arrangement was a success, allowing Aberdeen to achieve 1,800 indicated horsepower, a fuel consumption of 1.28 pounds (0.58 kg) of coal per indicated horsepower – which was felt to be the equivalent of 1.5–1.6 pounds (0.68–0.73 kg) of Welsh steam coal in sea service. This was a reduction in fuel consumption of about 60%, compared to a typical steamer built ten years earlier. In service, this translated into less than 40 tons of coal a day when travelling at 13 knots (24 km/h; 15 mph). These figures in trials were comfortably achieved on her maiden voyage. This level of efficiency meant that steamships could now operate as the primary method of maritime transport in the vast majority of commercial situations. This left no significant routes in which sail clearly outcompeted steam. Triple expansion steam engines would continue to power major vessels throughout the world for the next seventy years. (Note: The importance of fuel economy on steamships was well recognised by marine engineers. It comes under several headings: (i) On the route to Australia, there were long distances between coaling stations, and the coal at the more isolated places was substantially more expensive. (ii) Coaling took time, which was added to the total journey time. (iii) Any reduction in the amount of coal for a voyage gave more space available for money-earning cargo. (iv) A higher coal consumption required more stokers to shovel that coal into the boilers. Not only did extra stokers have to be paid and fed, they occupied space that could be earning money by accommodating cargo or passengers.)

An unusual feature of Aberdeen's boilers was the adjustable length of the grates. The coal available in Australia had a lower calorific value than Welsh steam coal. Therefore, on the return trip, full length fire bars of 6 feet (1.8 m) were used, compared to the outward passage, when a set only 5 feet (1.5 m) long were fitted, with some fire bricks blocking the unused space in the grate.

Aberdeen had clipper bows and three barque-rigged masts. Her hull was painted the characteristic green colour of all Aberdeen Line ships. As built, there was accommodation for 12 first-class passengers and, on the outward voyage to Australia, 450 third-class passengers. This was later increased.

== Effect on ship building ==
Other builders were planning their own ships with triple expansion engines before Aberdeen was proven in service; these ships were launched in the four years following 1881. Engine builders soon had their own designs of triple expansion engines. There was less variability with boilers, with shipowners generally preferring to opt for Scotch-type boilers.

Boiler pressures higher than Aberdeen's 125 pounds per square inch (860 kPa) were introduced, with 150 pounds per square inch (1,000 kPa) being used within three years. This was reliant on boilers made of steel manufactured to a sufficiently consistent standard, designed on the best engineering principles and operated with appropriate care. (Note: Failure to monitor boiler water level frequently could result in localised overheating (and hence weakening) of the boiler's steel.) Despite the strict rules on this laid down by the Board of Trade, there were occasional failures (with severe consequences for anyone in the boiler room at the time). Overall, though, the technology was available to produce and increase the necessary pressures. By the latter half of the 1880s boilers running at 200 pounds per square inch (1,400 kPa) were being built. (Note: The dates of the maiden voyages of example ships with increasing boiler pressures and with their coal consumption in pounds per indicated horsepower per hour are: Aberdeen, 1882, 125 psi, 1.55 Thermopylae, 1891, 160 psi, 1.52 Salamis, 1899, 200 psi, 1.48.)

The marine two-cylindered compound engine rapidly became obsolete, with virtually none being built from 1885 onwards.

== British service (1882–1906) ==
Aberdeen began her maiden voyage on 30 March 1882, under the command of Charles Matheson, who had previously been captain of Thermopylae. She took a triangular route. The outward leg started from London, picked up passengers at Plymouth, made a coaling stop at Cape Town and arrived at Melbourne on 14 May, having logged 44 days of steaming. She averaged 302 nautical miles (559 km; 348 mi) per day at a daily fuel consumption of 35 tons – well within the "in service" figure estimated from trials. She unloaded at Melbourne and Sydney, then took a cargo of New South Wales coal to Shanghai. The third leg of the triangle was tea from Foochow (Fuzhou), back to London via the Suez Canal, with intermediate stops at Hong Kong and Singapore. This triangular route was necessary because there was a shortage of cargoes to take back to London from Australia at that time of year. It replicated the route taken by the sailing fleet of the Aberdeen Line. Aberdeen's second voyage was directly to and from Australia, carrying a cargo of wool on the return trip. This was the pattern of trade for her first seven years: two voyages to Australia a year, with the return trip alternating between wool from the Australian wool sales and tea from China (with coal from Australia to China).

Aberdeen's triangular trade was in competition with shipowners who had steamers in the China to London trade. These operated a cartel called the China and Japan Conference, which sought to control the rates of freight from China. They attempted to prevent non-conference ships from competing by invoking their ability to remove retrospective rebates in freight rates from shippers who sent any cargoes on ships that were not a member of the conference. The 1882 cargo loaded by Aberdeen in Foochow was one element of a dispute over this cartel. It culminated in a court case in 1887, which the Conference won in the High Court, the Court of Appeal, and then in the House of Lords. In 1889, Aberdeen ceased making return trips via China and concentrated on a service directly to and from Australia.

The import of frozen meat from Australia had been suggested among Aberdeen Line management in 1880. However, they were slow to adapt a ship for its carriage, preferring to wait for the cessation of any market resistance to this product that might affect the return on the investment required. The Orient Line started fitting refrigeration to three ships in 1880 and other lines had their ships similarly equipped in 1887, 1890 and 1893. Aberdeen was eventually adapted to carry frozen meat in 1892. (Note: It is suggested that the different ownership and financing methods used by the Aberdeen Line, with ships being financed by equity from the owners rather than by borrowing, may have slowed the investment in refrigeration machinery and insulation.)

She was modernized in 1892 and again in 1896, when electric lights and refrigeration were installed. Her last voyage with the Aberdeen Line was to Sydney and started on 19 December 1905.

== Ottoman service (1906–1915) ==
In 1906, the Ottoman government acquired Aberdeen and renamed her Halep. She was employed as a troopship and a ferry on the Black Sea. During the Gallipoli campaign of World War I, she was refitted into a hospital ship, assigned to the Hilal-i Ahmer (Ottoman Turkish for Red Crescent) to transport wounded soldiers to the Selimiye Barracks in Istanbul, which was converted into a military hospital.

In May 1915, the Royal Navy submarine HMS E11, towards the end of her first cruise into the Bosphorus, was unable to attack the passing Halep, as all E11's torpedoes had already been fired. On 5 August, on the first day of her second cruise, E11 torpedoed Halep off Akbaş jetty, east of Eceabat on the Gallipoli peninsula. She was struck on the starboard side, forward, and sank in shallow water. On 8 August she was refloated and taken to Istanbul for repairs. The transport, having returned to Akbaş, was again torpedoed on 25 August, this time amidships, and capsized and sank. It is estimated that two hundred of the crew and soldiers on board were killed. The shipwreck lies 10–15 m (33–49 ft) under water off Akbaş.

On 25 August 2022, a rally and a dive on the shipwreck took place, to commemorate and pay tribute to the soldiers and medical personnel who died during the incident.
