= John Samuel Swire =

British businessman (1825–1898)

- Born: 24 December 1825; Liverpool, England
- Died: 1 December 1898 (aged 72); London, England
- Occupation: Businessman
- Spouses: Abigail Fairrie; Mary Warren
- Children: John Swire; George Swire
- Parent(s): John Swire; Maria Louisa Roose
- Relatives: William Hudson Swire (brother)

John Samuel Swire (24 December 1825 – 1 December 1898) was a British businessman. He grew his family business, the Swire Group, and expanded the cotton and sugar trade with China. He established the Taikoo Sugar Refinery in Hong Kong and The China Navigation Company on the Yangtze river. He was the instigator and founding chairman of the China and Japan Conference (later known as the Far Eastern Freight Conference). This shipping cartel existed from 1879 to 2008 and was a major component of the shipping industry from the Far East to Europe.

== Early life ==
John Samuel Swire was born on 24 December 1825 in Liverpool, England. His father, John Swire, was the founder of the Swire Group. His mother was Maria Louisa Roose. He had a younger brother, William Hudson Swire, born in 1830. They inherited the family business when their father died in 1847, when Swire was twenty-two years old. Later in his twenties, he went travelling in the United States and Australia.

== Career ==
Swire established Swire Bros in Melbourne, Australia in 1855.

In 1865, he negotiated with Alfred Holt to expand the cotton trade with China by using Holt's Blue Funnel Line. He entered in a partnership with Richard Shackleton Butterfield, a textile manufacturer from York, and established Butterfield and Swire in Shanghai in 1867, followed by additional offices in England and the United States. A year later, in 1868, they parted ways, as Swire kept the Shanghai office and Butterfield kept the English and American operations. Swire renamed the Shanghai company Taikoo Sugar Refinery.

Swire moved his main office from Liverpool to London in 1870. Together with Holt and the Scotts Shipbuilding and Engineering Company, he established The China Navigation Company to expand trade with China on the Yangtze river.

In 1879, Swire was, as Holt's Far East agent, the main force in the founding of the China and Japan Conference (later known as the Far Eastern Freight Conference). This was a grouping of some of the steamship owners involved in routes from China and Japan to Britain. They co-operated in order to overcome excess capacity of steamers in that trade. Described by some as a cartel, the conference rewarded shippers that gave all their business to ships owned by conference members through a system of deferred rebates to the freight rates charged. These discounts were deferred for, typically, six months and were not payable if the shipper used a ship outside the conference in that time. The conference survived a legal challenge in 1885, which went to the High Court in 1887, then through the Court of Appeal and ultimately to the House of Lords: the conference won at every level. There were later enquiries on the anti-competitive nature of the conference, which it survived. However, when the European Union withdrew its exemption of shipping conferences from its competition laws, the conference was forced to close in October 2008.

== Personal life ==
He was married twice. He first married Abigail Fairrie, the daughter of Adam Fairrie, a sugar refiner from Ayrshire, in 1859. They had a son, John Swire. Abigail died in 1862. Two decades later, in 1881, he married Mary Warren, the daughter of George Warren, a shipowner from Liverpool. They had one son, George Swire. They resided at Leighton House in Leighton Buzzard and maintained a London townhouse at 1, Pembridge Square.

== Death ==
He died on 1 December 1898 in London.
