= Swire =

Hong Kong-British multinational conglomerate

Swire Group

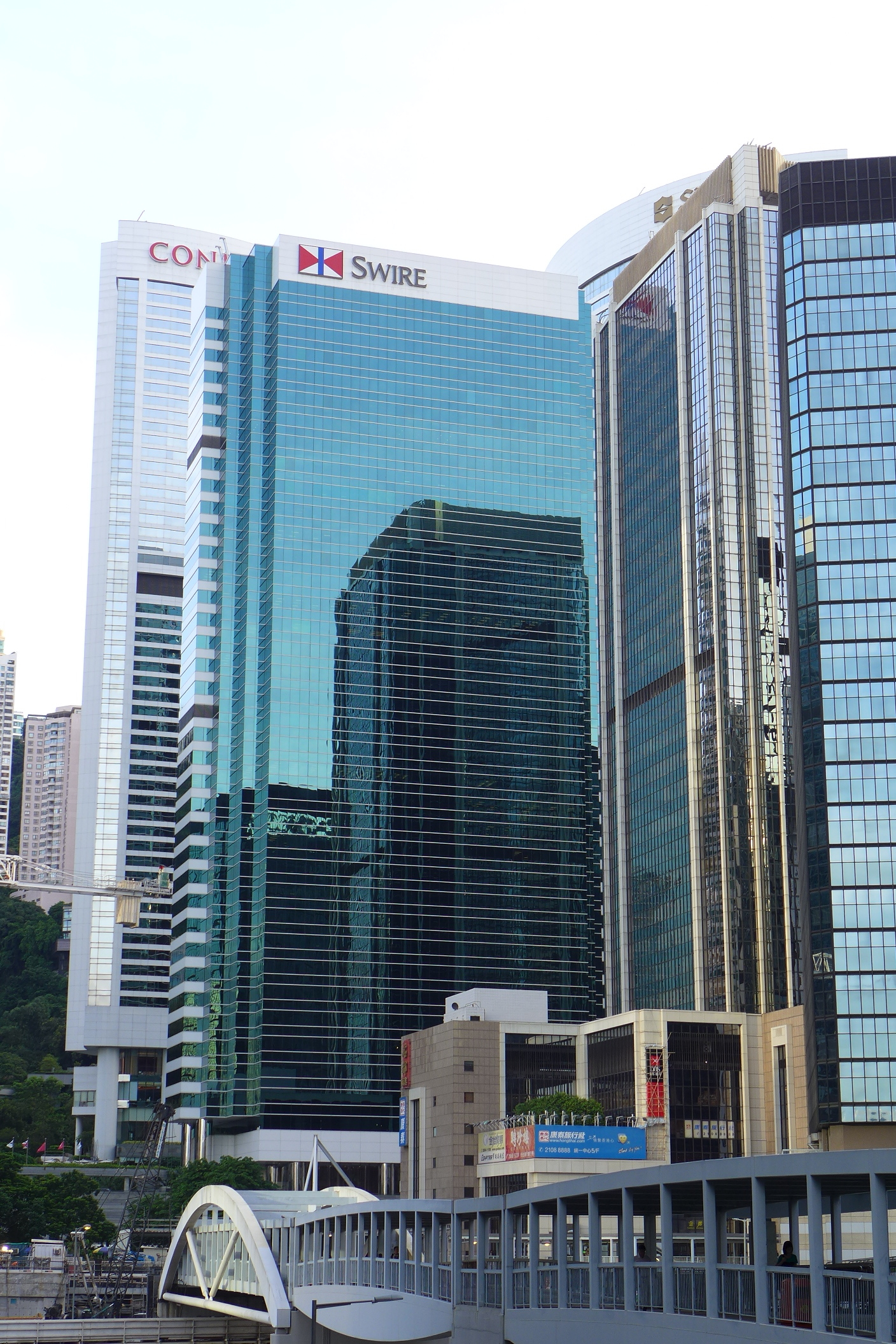
- Hong Kong headquarters at One Pacific Place
- Type: Private company limited by shares (John Swire & Sons Limited); Public (Swire Pacific Limited)
- Traded as: Swire Pacific Limited: SEHK: 19 (A-shares); SEHK: 87 (B-shares); Hang Seng component (19)
- Industry: Conglomerate
- Founded: 1816; 210 years ago
- Headquarters: One Pacific Place, Hong Kong (Operational HQ); London (Registered HQ) (Hong Kong but with registered office in London for John Swire & Sons Limited (UK) and some other related entities and subsidiaries)
- Key people: Barnaby Swire, Chairman, John Swire & Sons Limited, Merlin Bingham Swire, (Chairman, Swire Pacific)
- Products: Property, aviation, beverages, food chain, shipping, offshore support services, agriculture, manufacturing, wholesale and retail, mining etc.
- Revenue: ▲£12.08 billion (2021); US$16.3 billion
- Number of employees: 121,000+
- Subsidiaries: Swire Pacific; Steamships Trading Company; Swire Beverages; Swire Shipping; Swire Resources; Swire Foods
- Website: Swire.com

Swire
- Traditional Chinese: 太古集團
- Simplified Chinese: 太古集团
- Jyutping: taai3 gu2 zaap6 tyun4
Transcriptions
Standard Mandarin
- Hanyu Pinyin: Tàigǔ Jítuán
Yue: Cantonese
- Jyutping: taai3 gu2 zaap6 tyun4

Swire Group (Chinese: 太古集團) is a highly diversified global conglomerate with its parent company being John Swire & Sons Limited that holds controlling stakes in a range of businesses trading in the UK, USA, Australia, Papua New Guinea, East and West Africa, and across Southeast Asia. The Group's businesses are arranged into groups: property, aviation, beverages and food chain, marine services, and trading and industrial.

Its core businesses are mainly focused on Asia, with its key operations in Hong Kong and mainland China. Within Asia, Swire's activities come under the group's publicly quoted arm, Swire Pacific Limited, which is the largest shareholder in two Hong Kong listed companies: Swire Properties and Cathay Pacific. Swire Pacific is part of Forbes Global 2000. Taikoo (太古) is the Chinese name of Swire. It serves as the brand name for businesses such as Taikoo Sugar, Taikoo Li, Taikoo Hui and Taikoo Shing.

== History ==
The Swire Group's privately owned parent company is London-based John Swire & Sons Limited. The Swire Group, started by John Swire (1787–1847) in 1816, had its beginnings as a modest Liverpool import-export company based mainly on the textile trade.

Swire Pacific Offshore Holdings Limited (SPO), was a wholly owned subsidiary of Swire Pacific, supplying chartered vessels that supported the offshore oil and gas industry worldwide. It owned a fleet of 69 offshore vessels. Tidewater entered into a definitive agreement to acquire all of the outstanding shares of Swire Pacific Offshore (SPO), a subsidiary of Swire Pacific Limited, for approximately $190 million in early March 2022. Tidewater announced the completion of its acquisition of Swire Pacific Offshore on Friday 22 April 2022.

== Businesses ==
=== Swire Pacific Limited ===
The Swire Group's core businesses in Hong Kong are held by Swire Pacific Limited, listed on the Hong Kong Stock Exchange. It also operates Swire Beverages Holdings Ltd and Swire Foods Holdings Ltd for their beverages and food chain group.

==== Cathay Pacific Airways ====
In 1948, Swire Pacific acquired Cathay Pacific, Hong Kong's largest airline, and remains as the largest shareholder, with 42%.

==== Swire Properties ====
Incorporated in 1972, Swire Properties develops and manages commercial, retail and residential properties, with a particular focus on mixed-use development in prime locations at major mass transportation intersections.

The company's investment portfolio in Hong Kong totals approximately 17.8 million sq ft (approximately 1.66 million square metres (Note: Gross floor area in respect of 100% of the properties excluding car park areas and not on an attributable basis.)) of gross floor area, with Pacific Place, Island East as its core holdings.

In addition to Hong Kong, the company has a presence in China, the United States and the United Kingdom. In China, Swire Properties has a portfolio amounting to approximately 12.9 million sq ft (approximately 1.20 million square metres), the majority of which is under construction. The five projects consist of mixed-use developments in Beijing, Shanghai, Guangzhou and Chengdu, with Sanlitun Village and The Opposite House hotel in Beijing being the best-known among them.

In 2008, the company formed Swire Hotels to create and manage urban hotels in Hong Kong, China and the United Kingdom.

==== Swire Resources ====
Swire Resources is a Hong Kong retail company specializing in sports apparel, swimwear, and footwear.

The company is the Hong Kong distributor for several major international brands, including Aldo, Arena, Columbia Sportswear, Crocs, Rockport, and Speedo.

=== Swire Shipping ===
Swire Shipping is the wholly owned shipping arm of John Swire & Sons Limited, headquartered in Singapore. It operates shipping agencies for its liner shipping trades.

The company has a 67% shareholding in Quadrant Pacific of New Zealand that provides third-party agency services to the forestry and oil industries, as well as husbandry services.

=== Swire Bulk ===
Swire Bulk is a company that is in HK.

=== Steamships Trading Company ===
Steamships Trading Company is a diversified leader in shipping, transport, property and commercial operation in Papua New Guinea.

The company has a 70% shareholding in Consort Express Lines, a leading provider of coastal and river shipping services in Papua New Guinea. Its liner trades service 17 ports in Papua New Guinea and the company also provides project charters.

The company has a 100% shareholding in Pacific Towing, which has a harbor towing, offshore support and salvage operation that owns and operates 12 tugs and nine line boats across seven ports in Papua New Guinea.

=== John Swire and Sons (Green Investments) Ltd ===
John Swire & Sons (Green Investments) Ltd has acquired Scottish biodiesel producer Argent Energy. Argent Energy pioneered large scale commercial biodiesel production in the UK when it started production at its plant near Motherwell in Scotland in 2005. The firm makes its road fuel by recycling wastes and residues from other industries – specifically used cooking oil which is a waste from the food industry, tallow from the meat industry, and sewer grease.

=== Swire Coca-Cola ===
Swire is an anchor bottler in the Coca-Cola System. It is the bottler of Coca-Cola and its related products in 11 provinces and the Shanghai Municipality in Mainland China, Hong Kong, Taiwan, Cambodia, Vietnam, and 13 states in the western United States. This territory represents a population of 780 million people.

== Chairmen ==
=== Chairmen of Swire Pacific ===
Swire Pacific was formed in 1974 (from Taikoo Swire) to become the main holding company for Swire's Hong Kong–based assets.

1. John Bremridge, 1974–1980
2. Duncan Bluck, 1981–1984
3. Michael Miles, 1984–1988
4. David Gledhill, 1988–1992
5. Peter Sutch, 1992–1999
6. James Hughes-Hallett, 1999–2004
7. David Turnbull, 2005–2006
8. Christopher Pratt, 2006–2014
9. John Slosar, 2014–2018 (First non-British citizen as chairman)
10. Merlin Swire, 2018–2021 (First Swire family chairman)
11. Guy Bradley, since 2021

== See also ==
- List of bottling companies
- List of oilfield service companies
