= Allied Chinese Ships =

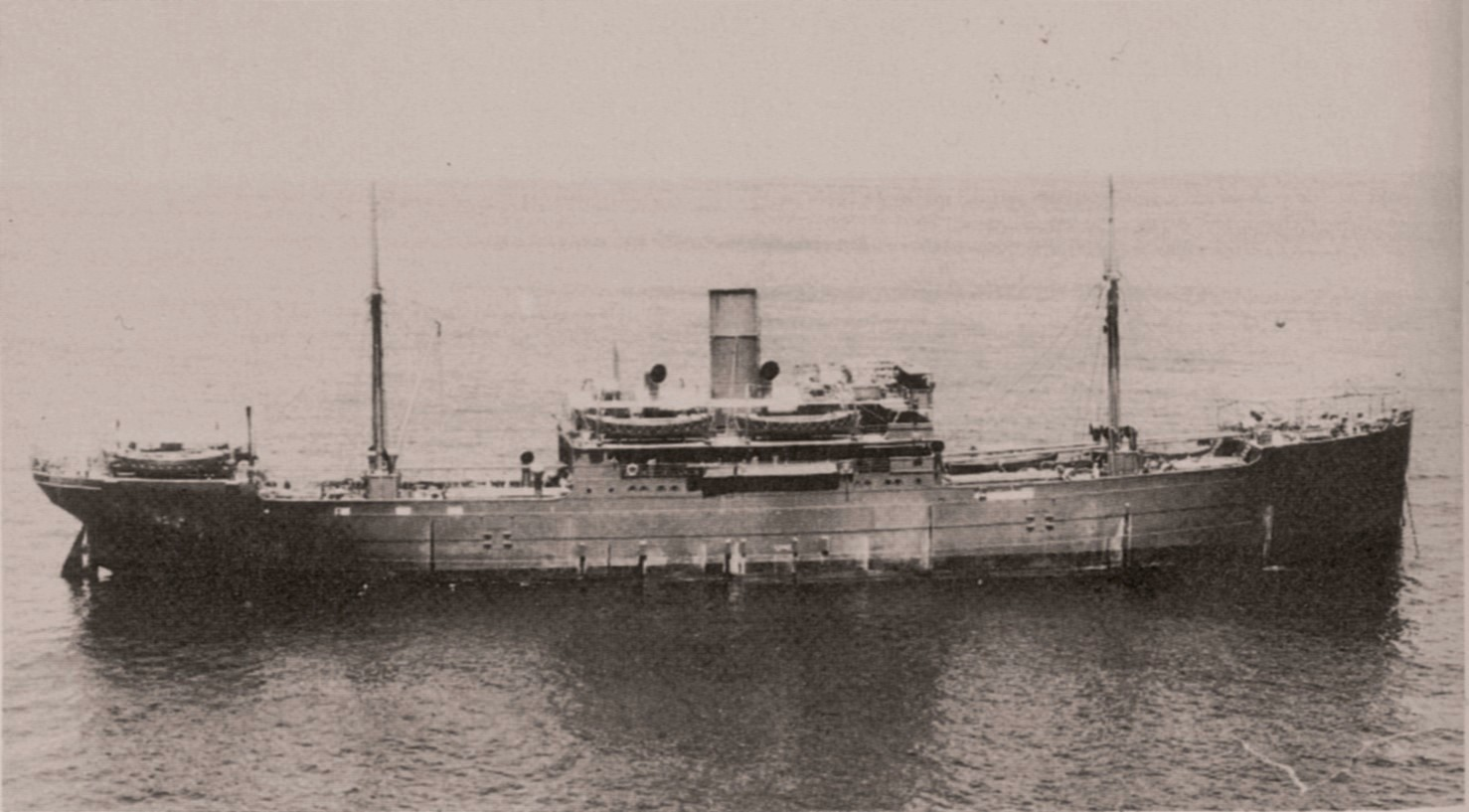
Yunnan off Fremantle in 1942.

The terms Allied Chinese Ships and Allied China Fleet refer to 32 vessels of the Hong Kong-based China Navigation Company requisitioned by the Royal Navy and the Royal Australian Navy during World War II. Following the Battle of Singapore in early 1942, many of the requisitioned ships joined the Allied retreat to Australia. Six were acquired by the Royal Australian Navy; four of these were commissioned as auxiliary warships, while two served as Victualing Supply Issuing Ships.

== Ships ==
=== Royal Navy ===
- HMS Anking – Requisitioned 1941 as depot ship, sunk 4 March 1942 by gunfire from Japanese cruisers while evacuating to Australia.
- HMS Changteh – Requisitioned 1941 as a minesweeper, sunk 14 February 1942 by heavy Japanese air attack while evacuating RAF personnel to Indragiri River, Sumatra, with the loss of over 100 lives.
- Tug Chuting – Requisitioned 1941 as a minesweeper, sunk 15 February 1942 in Singapore.
- RFA Shengking – Requisitioned December 1941 by the Ministry of War Transport for service with the Royal Fleet Auxiliary as a supply ship in the Indian Ocean.
- HMS Wuchang – Requisitioned by Ministry of War Transport in Shanghai 1940, and moved to Singapore for use by the RAF as a floating munitions depot. On 11 February 1942, and with Japanese forces nearing the harbour, Wuchang raised steam to evacuate her load of munitions and making for the Dutch East Indies capital of Batavia (Jakarta). At Batavia they took on fuel, supplies and 435 Army and RAF personnel and set out for Colombo, Ceylon. Refurbished as a RN submarine depot ship and commissioned on 12 May 1942, Wuchang served at Trincomalee until returned China Navigation Company in 1946.
- MV Wusueh – Requisitioned April 1941 by the Ministry of War Transport for service transporting troops around the Malayan coast. In Autumn 1941 Wusueh was converted to a hospital ship in Singapore, and with its fall moved to Calcutta and was employed transporting wounded in Indian and Burmese waters, supporting the Allied effort during the Burma campaign. Returned to CNC in 1946 and employed as a ferry in Hong Kong, it was purchased by the RN in 1950. Wusueh was renamed HMS Ladybird and refitted with extensive communications facilities at the RN Dockyard in order to undertake the role of RN HQ Ship at Sasebo, Japan during the Korean War. With the armistice in 1953 it was once again handed back to CNC.

=== Ministry of War Transport ===
- SS Hoihow (II) – Requisitioned 1943 as stores transport servicing Indian Ocean islands. On 2 July 1943, she was sunk 103 nautical miles (191 km) north west of Mauritius by the German U-Boat U-181, killing 145 of the 149 people on board.
- SS Kiungchow – Requisitioned 1941. A fire broke out while unloading fuel at Tobruk on 28 November 1942 and the ship had to be scuttled in shallow water to extinguish the flames, before being raised and towed to Alexandria for repairs. Acquired by the Ministry of War Transport, the China Navigation Company continued to act as the ship's managers.
- SS Liangchow – Requisitioned 1941, the Liangchow was blown ashore during a storm on 8 January 1943 and wrecked at Benghazi.
- SS Shuntien – Requisitioned 1941 by the Ministry of War Transport for use as a Defensively Equipped Merchant Ships. On 23 December 1941, Shuntien arrived at Tobruk with supplies, before leaving for Alexandria as a part of Convoy TA5 with four escorts. As well as her 70 crew and 18 Royal Artillery gunners manning her weapons, Shuntien carried 850–1100 German and Italian POWs. At 1910 hours, 100 nautical miles (190 km) west of Alexandria, Shuntien was hit by a single torpedo fired by U-559 which blew off the stern section. The ship sank within five minutes and with her bow high in the air, preventing any boats from being launched or a distress call being sent. Over 100 survivors were picked up by HMS Salvia, and another 19 were picked up by HMS Heythrop. Just over six hours later, at 0135 hours, HMS Salvia was hit by a torpedo fired by U-568 and broke in two, sinking a few minutes later and taking all 58 crew members and all the survivors she had picked up.
- MV Siushan – Requisitioned May 1941 in Shanghai and towed to Singapore in October. The Siushan was lost to enemy action 15 February 1942 during the evacuation of Singapore.

=== Royal Australian Navy ===
Commissioned

- HMAS Ping Wo
- HMAS Poyang
- HMAS Whang Pu
- HMAS Yunnan

Victualing Supply Issuing Ships

- VSIS Changte
- VSIS Taipang

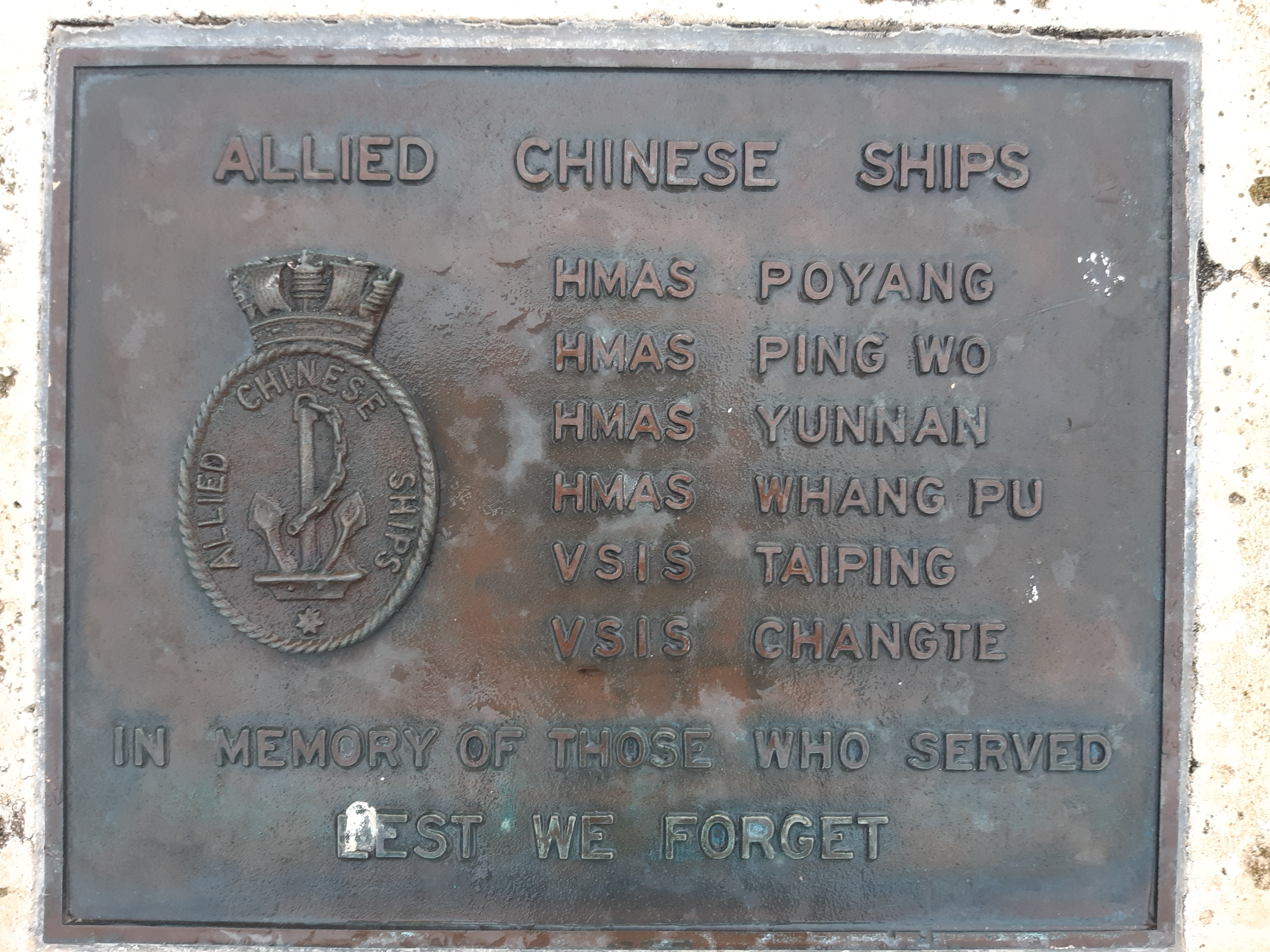
Commemorative plaque for the Allied Chinese Ships during the Second World War at Rockingham Naval Memorial Park

=== State Shipping Service of Western Australia ===
Chartered

- SS Chungking (I) – Escaped to Australia 1941, and chartered to the SSSWA 1942.

== See also ==
- Second Sino-Japanese War
