= SS Talthybius =

Three ships of the Holt Line were named Talthybius:

- SS Talthybius (1911), a cargo liner in service 1912–42
- SS Talthybius (1943), a Liberty ship in service 1947–54
- SS Talthybius (1944), a Victory ship in service 1960–71
