= Yang Bo =

Yang Bo may refer to:

- Yang Bo (door god), (Chinese: 楊波) venerated as a door deity with Xu Yanzhao (Chinese: 徐延昭)
- Yang Bo (gymnast) (born 1973), Chinese female gymnast
- Yang Bo (boxer) (born 1983), Chinese boxer
- Yang Bo (archer) (born 1978), Chinese archer
- Yang Bo (politician), former minister of light industry of China

== See also ==
- Bo Yang (disambiguation)
