= HMAS Ping Wo =

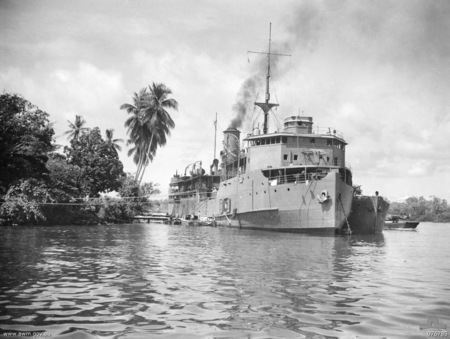
- HMAS Ping Wo at Madang, Papua New Guinea on 31 October 1944

History

Australia
- Namesake: 平和 (Cantonese ping^{4} wo^{4}), "equitable harmony"
- Owner: Indo-China Steam Navigation Company
- Builder: New Engineering & Ship Building, Shanghai
- Launched: 1922
- Acquired: 1941
- Commissioned: 22 May 1942
- Decommissioned: 24 June 1946

General characteristics
- Class & type: River steamer
- Tonnage: 2,671 GRT
- Length: 300 ft (91 m)
- Beam: 48 ft (15 m)
- Draught: 13.6 ft (4 m)
- Propulsion: Triple expansion engines
- Speed: 14 knots (26 km/h; 16 mph)
- Complement: 50
- Armament: 1 × 12-pounder gun; 2 × 20 mm cannon; 2 × .303 cal. Vickers machine gun

HMAS Ping Wo (not to be confused with HMAS Whang Pu) was a 3,105 tons former Indo-Chinese river steamer that was commissioned into the Royal Australian Navy (RAN) during World War II. The Chinese name translates to "Equitable Harmony". It was one of a group of vessels known as the "China Fleet" acquired by the RAN in similar circumstances.

== Operational history ==
Built in 1922 for the Indo-China Steam Navigation Company, the vessel was initially requisitioned for service with the Royal Navy (RN) in December 1941 as a water carrier.

After the fall of Singapore the vessel sailed to Batavia (now Jakarta) and with a mixed complement of RN and RAN reservists and civilian Chinese seamen, was engaged in the 62-day tow (at an average speed of three knots) of the disabled HMAS Vendetta from the Javan port of Tanjung Priok to Fremantle, Western Australia and subsequently part of the way to Melbourne to Albany. This tow was the longest ever involving an RAN warship. Some of her crew had previously served on the British cargo liner Talthybius, which had been sunk at Singapore in an air raid.

After this, Ping Wo was paid off by the RN on 19 May 1942 and then chartered and commissioned into the RAN on 22 May 1942. As HMAS Ping Wo, the vessel sailed to the east coast of Australia and was initially used as a tender at the joint Australian-United States amphibious training centre at HMAS Assault, Port Stephens. HMAS Ping Wo was later used as a stores ship and from January 1945 as a repair and works depot vessel in the New Guinea theatre of operations, winding up as the RAN administrative headquarters at Madang.

After the end of naval operations in New Guinea, HMAS Ping Wo was paid off and returned to her owners in Hong Kong on 24 June 1946.

== Post-war career ==
In September 1947, the vessel was sold to Hoong On Steam Navigation Co Ltd, Shanghai and renamed The On. In 1949, The On came under control of the new government of the People's Republic of China.

== See also ==
- Allied Chinese Ships
