= HMS Ladybird =

Three ships of the British Royal Navy have been named HMS Ladybird, after the ladybird family of beetles (Coccinellidae).

- The first HMS Ladybird (1916) was an Insect-class gunboat launched in 1916 and sunk off Tobruk in 1941.
- The second HMS Ladybird (1950) was a base ship purchased in 1950 and returned to the original owner in 1953.
- The third HMS Ladybird (1970) is a tender launched in 1970.
