= Evenlode (disambiguation) =

Evenlode is a village and civil parish in Gloucestershire, England.

Evenlode may also refer to:

- River Evenlode, in the Cotswolds in southern England
- HMS Evenlode (K300), 1942 River-class frigates
- SS Empire Evenlode, 1946–1949 name of SS Talthybius, cargo liner
