= Taikoo Dockyard =

Coordinates: 22.286°N 114.217°E

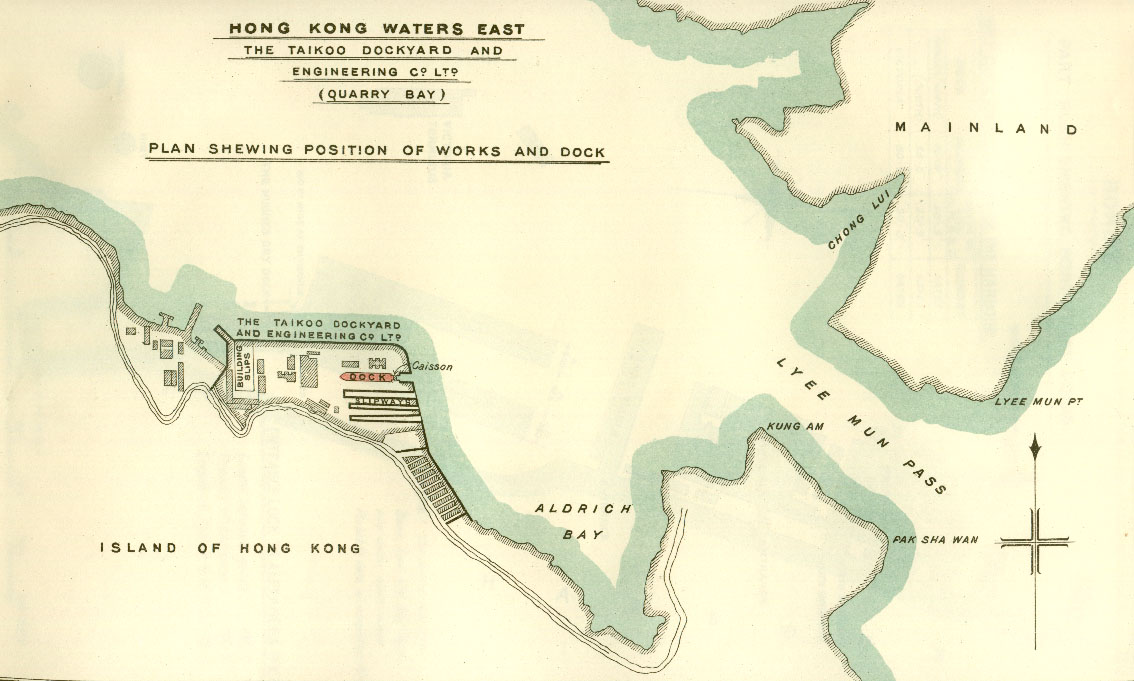
A map in 1900s showing Taikoo Dockyard

Taikoo Dockyard and Engineering Company (Chinese: 太古船塢; Jyutping: taai3 gu2 syun4 ou3) was a dockyard in what is now Taikoo Shing, MTR Tai Koo station and part of Taikoo Place of Quarry Bay on the Hong Kong Island in Hong Kong. It predates the era before the reclamation of Victoria Harbour.

== History ==
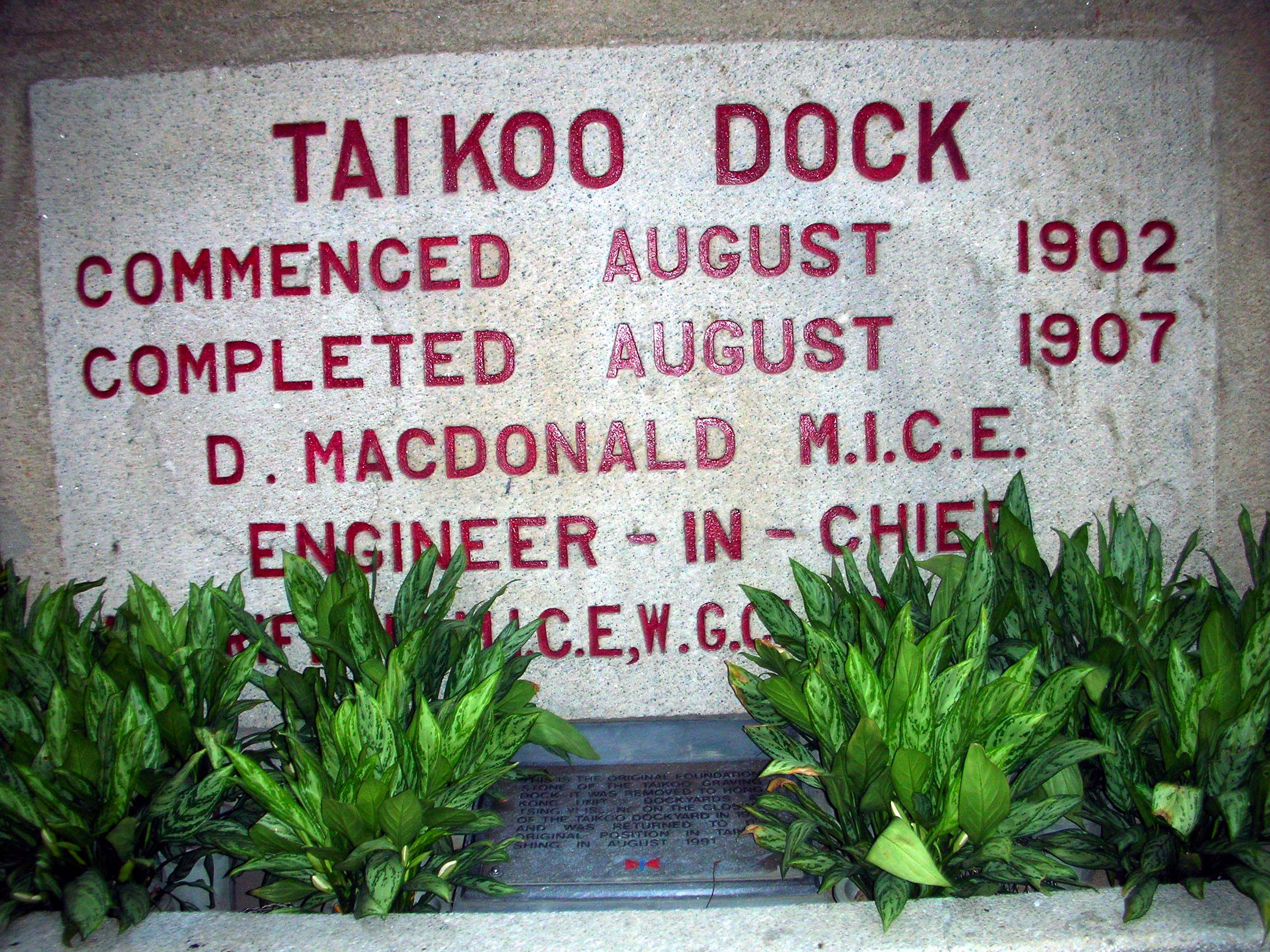
The foundation stone of Taikoo Dockyard in what is now Taikoo Shing

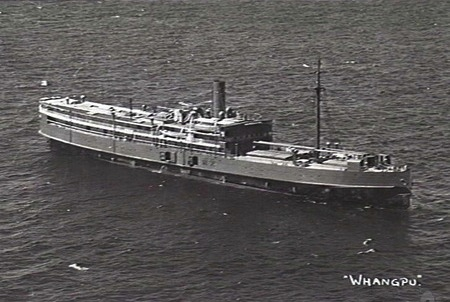
Taikoo Dockyard built the river steamship SS Whang Pu for China Navigation Co in 1920

The idea that John Swire and Sons should have their own dockyard in Hong Kong to service, repair, adapt and build vessels for The China Navigation Company was first put forward when the Sugar Refinery was established at Quarry Bay and surplus land remained on that site. The suggestion was made several times in the late 19th century but was opposed by John Samuel Swire as uneconomic and too far outside their usual interests.

The need, however, for adequate, reliable and easily available overhaul facilities in the East increased and the dockyard was eventually begun in 1900–01 at Quarry Bay. It was registered in Britain with John Swire & Sons appointed as London Managers, Butterfield & Swire Eastern Managers and Scotts Shipbuilding and Engineering Company as expert advisers.

The first ship for CNCo was built by 1910, but it was 16 years before there was a profit on the working account and 20 before a dividend was declared. The dockyard's chief competitor was the Hong Kong and Whampoa Dock Company from whom the new firm faced considerable hostility for many years until a working agreement was reached between them in 1913.

Beginning in colonial Hong Kong, Whampoa Dockyard Company and "Taikoo Dockyard and Engineering Company" were crucial for the economy. Together with the United Kingdom, these two docks in Hong Kong built the largest ships in the world in that era.

Simultaneously, China had multiple dockyards such as Shanghai Dock and Engineering Company in 1906, Tung Hwa Shipbuilding Works in 1910 and the Shanghai Dockyards Ltd in 1937. Though Hong Kong's dockyards always gave the British complete freedom in ship construction.

In the 1930s, Shanghai experienced difficult times through events such as the Battle of Shanghai in the Second Sino-Japanese War. Hong Kong's Taikoo Dockyard continued its own government training schools, which were later superseded by Hong Kong's Technical College.

By the Second World War other countries finally began building larger ships than Hong Kong.

In 1940 the British company went into voluntary liquidation so that a new one could be opened and registered in Hong Kong and the dockyard continued to expand after the Second World War despite the destruction caused by the Japanese in their occupation in 1942–45.

The Swire Group subsequently decided to use the land to develop a large private housing estate, Taikoo Shing. Closing in the early 1970s, the operation later merged with Whampoa Dockyard of Hutchison Whampoa to form a Hong Kong United Dockyard at the west coast of Tsing Yi Island on the western shore of new territories.

== Ships built ==
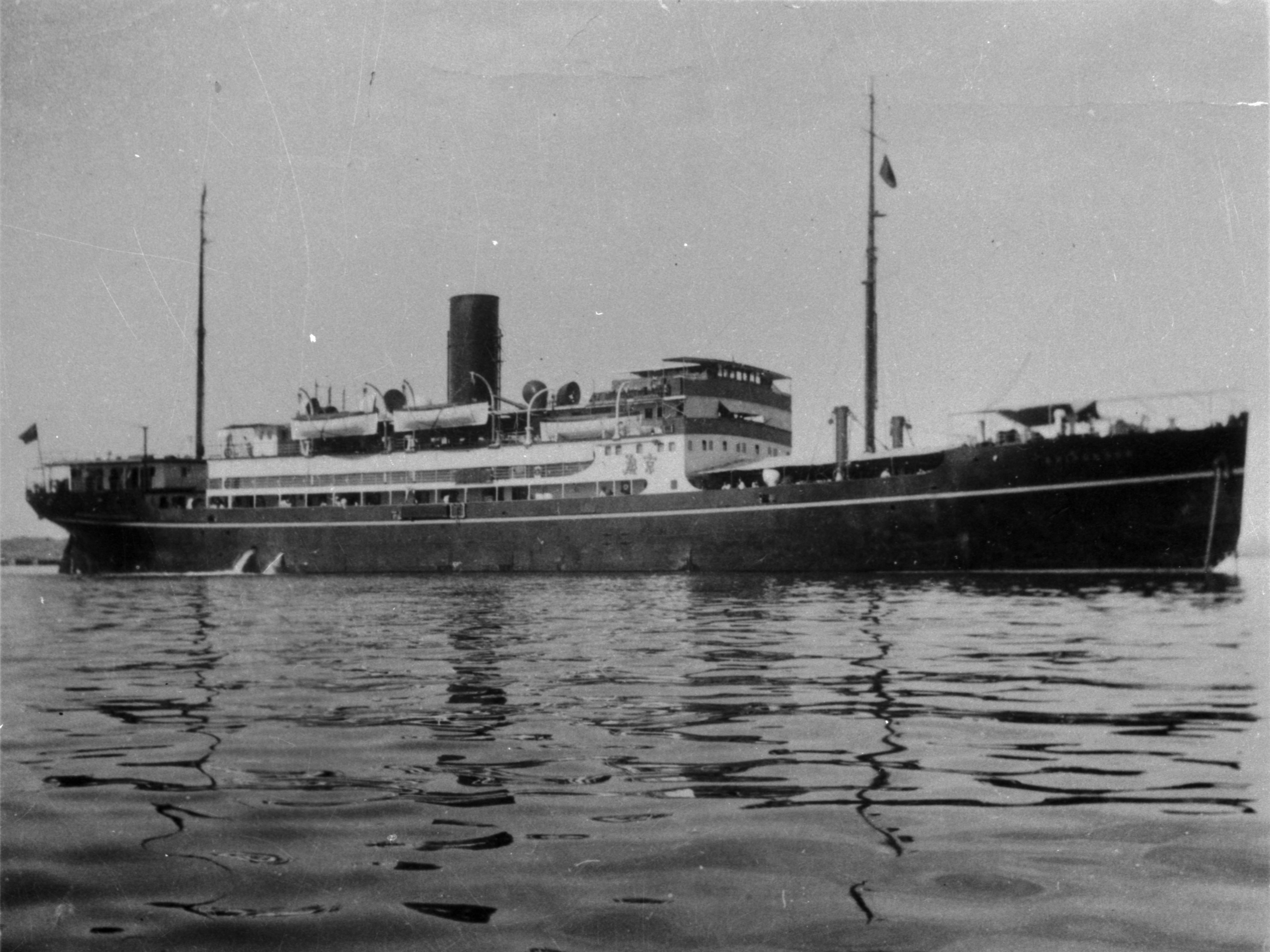
Taikoo Dockyard built the coastal steamship SS Shuntien for China Navigation Co in 1934

- Wuchang 1914 for the China Navigation Co – coal fired passenger ship on the Yangtze converted as submarine depot ship HMS Wuchang and in 1942 used as for the evacuation of Singapore.
- Autolycus 1917 for the Ocean Steam Ship Company - Steamer, 5,806 tons. Was the largest vessel built in a British territory outside the United Kingdom at the time.
- Whang Pu 1920 for the China Navigation Co – converted as a submarine depot ship and then in 1943 by the Royal Australian Navy as a mobile repair ship; returned to Royal Navy in 1946 and returned to CNC in Hong Kong and broken up in 1949.
- Anhui 1924 for the China Navigation Company
- Taishan 1925 for Jardine Matheson Co.
- Wusueh 1931 for the China Navigation Co.
- Fatshan 1933 for the China Navigation Company, later captured by the Imperial Japanese Army in service as Koto Maru before its return to C.N.C. after WWII. Sold several times between Hong Kong companies before acquisition by Tai Tak Hing Shipping Company. Sunk with loss of 88 lives during Typhoon Rose in 1971.
- Shuntien 1934 for the China Navigation Co – 3,059 GRT passenger and cargo liner sunk by U-559 near Tobruk in 1941.
- Breconshire 1939 for the Glen Line - 10,000-ton passenger-cargo liner and largest ship built to date by any Hong Kong dockyard.
- Poyang 1941 for the China Navigation Co – converted as an Armament Stores Issuing Ship by the Royal Australian Navy; returned to CNC in Hong Kong and broken up in 1970.

== See also ==
- The Hongs
- Hongkong United Dockyards
- Cosmopolitan Dock
