= Poyang =

Poyang may refer to:

- Lake Poyang, a lake in Jiangxi, China
- Poyang County, a county in China
- HMAS Poyang, an Australian ship

== See also ==
- Bo Yang (disambiguation)
