= HMAS Yunnan =

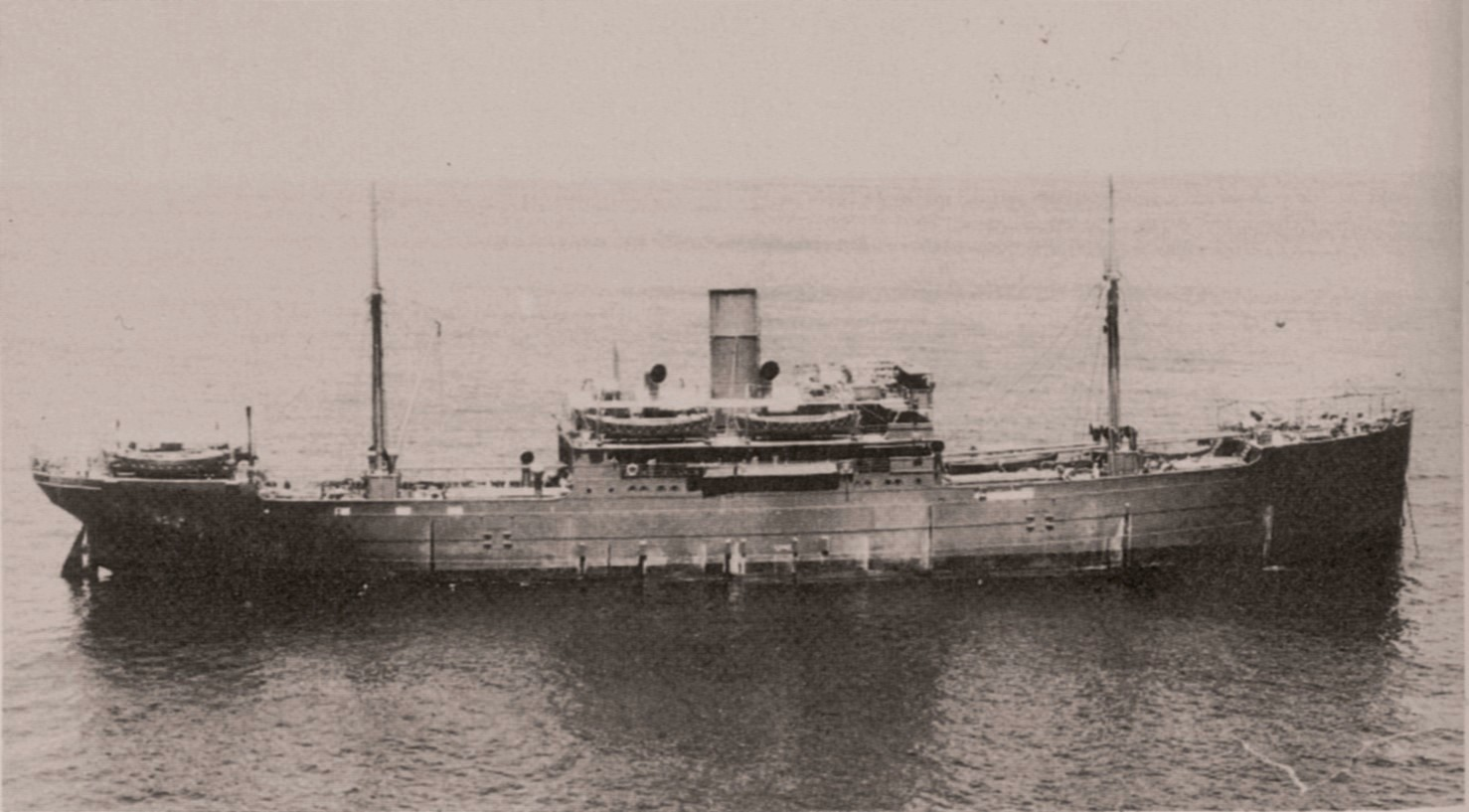
- Yunnan off Fremantle in 1942.

History

Australia
- Owner: China Steam Navigation Company
- Builder: Scotts Shipbuilding and Engineering Company, Greenock
- Yard number: 560
- Launched: 26 July 1934
- Acquired: 22 June 1942
- Commissioned: 20 September 1944
- Decommissioned: 31 January 1946
- Fate: Sold to shipbreakers in 1971.

General characteristics
- Class & type: Cargo vessel
- Tonnage: 2,812 GRT
- Length: 299.9 ft (91.4 m)
- Beam: 44.2 ft (13.5 m)
- Draught: 21.75 ft (6.63 m)
- Speed: 11 knots (20 km/h; 13 mph) (max); 6 knots (11 km/h; 6.9 mph) (cruising)

HMAS Yunnan (FL-151) was a 2,812-ton former steamer that was commissioned into the Royal Australian Navy (RAN) during the Second World War. It was one of a group of vessels known as the "China Fleet" acquired by the RAN in similar circumstances. During the war, the ship operated as an ammunition supply vessel in the Pacific. At the conclusion of hostilities, she was transferred to the British, and was eventually sold to civilian owners. She was broken up in 1971.

== Construction and design ==
Built by Scotts Shipbuilding and Engineering Company, Greenock in 1934 for the China Steam Navigation Company, Yunnan was 299.9 ft (91.4 m) long, and displaced 2,812 tons. She had a beam of 44.2 ft (13.5 m), and a draught of 21.75 ft (6.63 m). In RAN service, the vessel was armed with one Oerlikon and two machine-guns for self-defence. Propulsion was provided by an oil fuelled five cycle engine capable of producing 425 NHP, giving the vessel a maximum speed of 11 knots (20 km/h; 13 mph) and a cruising speed of 6 knots (11 km/h; 6.9 mph). It had a capacity to carry 980 cubic feet of cargo.

== Operational history ==
Yunnan was requisitioned by the Royal Australian Navy on 22 June 1942 and operated in North Queensland and New Guinea waters with her civilian crew. She was commissioned into the Royal Australian Navy as HMAS Yunnan on 20 September 1944 and sailed as part of the supply force for the Leyte campaign, then sailed for Hollandia. Although attached to the supply force for the military landings at Lingayen Gulf, Yunnan was not present at the landing. During the later part of 1945, she operated in New Guinea, Admiralty Group, Morotai, Tawi Tawi and the Philippines area, before returning to Sydney and was paid off on 31 January 1946.

She was acquired by the British Ministry of War Transport before being returned to her owners. Yunnan was sold in September 1959 to Thai Navigation Company and renamed Hock Ann. She was sold in May 1963 to Guan Guan Enterprises and transferred to Guan Guan Shg. Company and renamed Kim Hock, before transferring to Hong Kong South Sea Shg. Company in October 1963. Renamed Kario in May 1964, she was sold to Transportes Maritimos de San Blas, Panama in August. In 1965, she was transferred to Cia de Nav. Santos and renamed Bakna, before being renamed in 1966 Kario and later Murcia. Murcia was transferred to King Line S.A., Panama in 1966 and renamed King Eagle. In 1968, she was transferred to Guan Guan Shg. Company, Singapore and renamed Kim Hock, before being renamed Kim Hai in 1971.

== Fate ==
Kim Hai arrived in Hong Kong on 9 June 1971 for breaking up by Leung Yau.

== Notes ==
Citations

Bibliography

- Gillett, Ross; Graham, Colin (1977). Warships of Australia. Adelaide, South Australia: Rigby. ISBN 0-7270-0472-7.
