= SS Fatshan (1933) =

Chinese passenger ferry

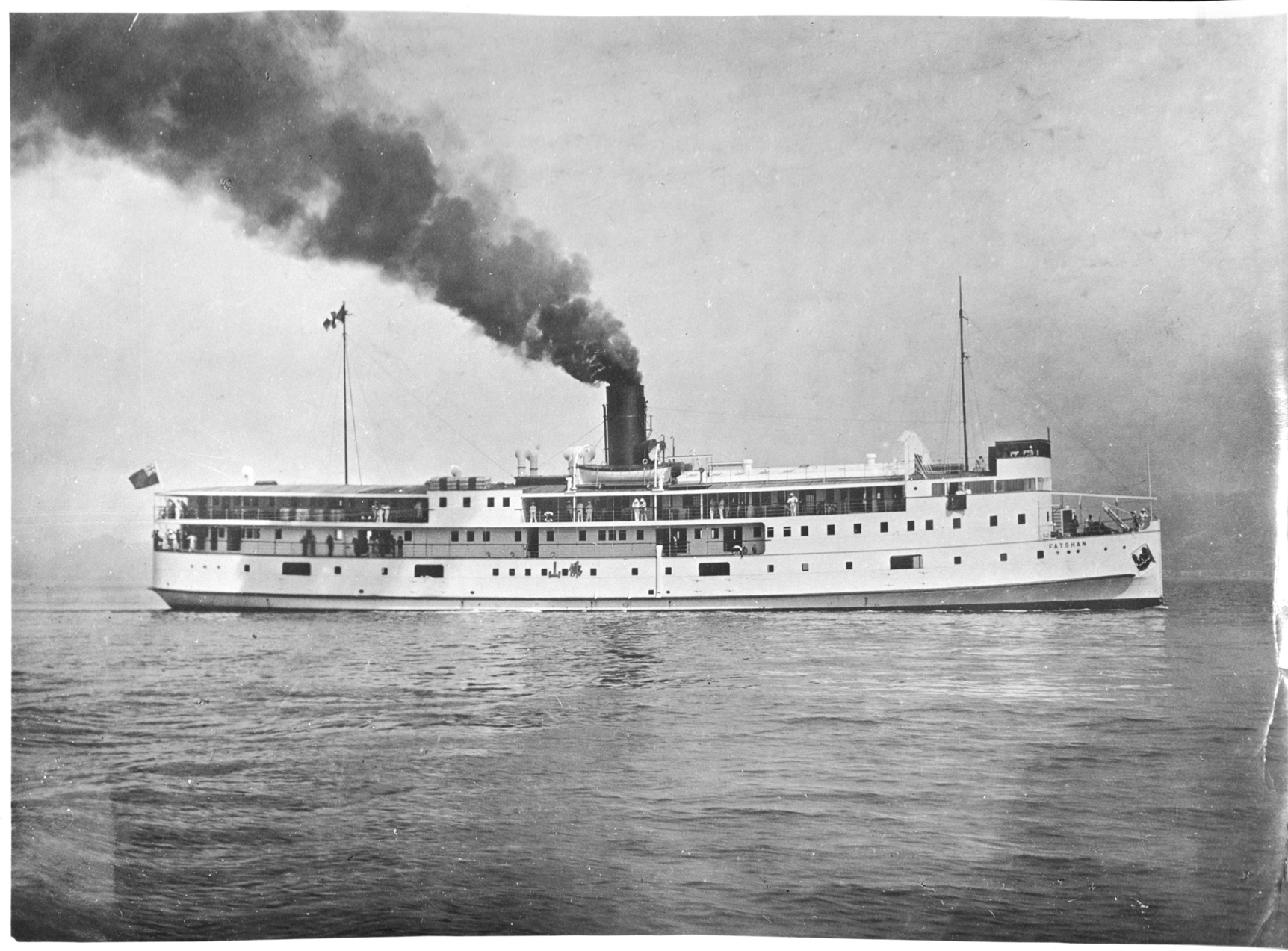
- Fatshan sailing under the Swire flag of the China Navigation Company and British Hong Kong likely taken between 1933 and 1941

History

Hong Kong
- Name: Fatshan
- Namesake: City of Fatshan (now Foshan), Canton Province
- Builder: Taikoo Dockyard and Engineering Company, Hong Kong
- Yard number: 262
- Launched: 1933
- Sponsored by: China Navigation Company
- Fate: Captured by Imperial Japanese Army in December 1941 after the Battle of Hong Kong.

Empire of Japan
- Name: Nankai-201
- Operator: Inland River Operations Company
- Builder: Taikoo Dockyard and Engineering Company
- Acquired: December 1941
- Commissioned: 1941
- Fate: Requisitioned by IJN as troop and supply transport, renamed as Koto Maru

Empire of Japan
- Name: Koto Maru
- Operator: Imperial Japanese Navy
- Builder: Taikoo Dockyard and Engineering Company
- Acquired: 1942
- Commissioned: 1942
- Stricken: 1945
- Fate: Returned to China Navigation Company in August 1945

Hong Kong
- Name: SS Fatshan
- Owner: 1945–1951: China Navigation Company; 1951–1951: Man On Shipping and Navigation Company; 1951–1968: Yu On Shipping Company (裕安輪船); 1968–1971: Tai Tak Hing Shipping Company
- Builder: Taikoo Dockyard and Engineering Company
- Acquired: August 1945
- Commissioned: 1951
- Decommissioned: 1971
- Stricken: 1971
- Identification: ID/IMO No. 5112846; UKHO Wreck No. 46616
- Fate: Sank on 16 August 1971 during Typhoon Rose

General characteristics (as Fatshan)
- Class & type: Steam powered ferry
- Tonnage: 2,639 GRT; 1,579 NRT
- Length: 241 ft (73.5 m)
- Beam: 45.5 ft (13.9 m)
- Depth: 11 ft (3.4 m)
- Installed power: 71 nhp. 2,600 ihp (1,900 kW)
- Propulsion: Triple expansion steam engine
- Speed: 13 knots (24 km/h; 15 mph)
- Boats & landing craft carried: Lifeboat: 54 persons; Raft: 550 persons
- Capacity: 39 first class; 23 cabin class; 60 steerage; 1,261 unberthed

SS Fatshan (Chinese: 佛山輪) was a passenger ferry steamer which sank in stormy seas off Lantau Island during Typhoon Rose resulting in the loss of 88 lives.

== Construction and commissioning ==
Fatshan was ordered by the China Navigation Company as a replacement for the previous Fatshan to take up its relevant duties on the ferry service between Hong Kong and Canton after 45 years of service.

The ship was built at the Taikoo Dockyard's lot 262 by the Taikoo Dockyard and Engineering Company, delivered to China Navigation Company in 1933. She was powered by a four-cylinder triple expansion steam engine producing 71 nhp and displacing 2,639 gross register tons.

== Hong Kong Canton route with the China Navigation Company ==
In December 1939, Fatshan was underway under the command of Captain Whyte en route to Canton from Hong Kong when the steamer struck a submerged object which tore a large hole into the ship's hull near the engine room. Captain Whyte managed to beach the steamer on nearby Japanese-occupied Lin Tin Island, avoiding its sinking. A passing British warship, HMS Tarantula of the China Station came to the ship's rescue, transferring around 1,800 passengers and their baggage onto the gunboat. The passengers were later transferred from the warship onto SS Kinshan of the HongKong Canton & Macao Steamboat Company.

In August 1940, Fatshan was detained by Japanese authorities over Swire's refusal to pay piloting fees. The detention led to a brief diplomatic incident between British and Japanese colonial authorities before the ship was finally released in April 1941.

In December 1941, Fatshan was captured by the Imperial Japanese Army after their victory in the Battle of Hong Kong and renamed as Nankai-201.

== Japanese service ==
During Japanese rule of Hong Kong and until around 1942, Nankai-201 continued operating as a ferry service between Hong Kong and Canton, likely with the Inland River Operations Company. In 1942, the ship was renamed as Koto Maru and began carrying out duties including troop and supply transport in the region for the Imperial Japanese Navy.

On 9 August 1944, Koto Maru was spotted and reported on by agents of the British Army Aid Group as part of their Naval Section's Kweilin Intelligence Summary No. 70. The ship was recorded as having arrived at Hong Kong around 18 July from Canton and had been laid up for repairs at the Taikoo Dockyard for repairs to its stern, hull, propeller, and rudder for discharge on around 1 September. The vessel was recorded as having a light grey colour scheme with armament modifications including an anti-aircraft machine gun on the bridge and was crewed by 4 Japanese, 30 Chinese and 6 Indian sailors.

An earlier sketch of Koto Maru from September 1944 indicated that there was no significant changes to the ship's peacetime configuration aside from the colour scheme and light armament.

== Resumed Hong Kong Canton route with the China Navigation Company ==
In August 1945 with the reestablishment of British rule in Hong Kong, Fatshan was returned to the China Navigation Company.

In January 1949, Fatshan participated in the opening of the Pearl River's Elliot Passage carrying the British delegation to officiate the ceremony. In May 1950, the Communist government passed legislation barring foreign vessels from calling at Canton. As a result, Fatshan was moved to the Hong Kong Macao route.

== Hong Kong Macao route with the Man On Shipping and Navigation Company ==
In May 1951, Fatshan was acquired by Sir Tsun-Nin Chau for the Man On Shipping and Navigation Company. At the time, Fatshan was one of the main ferry boats operating the Hong Kong to Macao route, the others being MV Tai Loy and SS Tak Shing.

== Hong Kong Macao route with the Yu On Shipping Company ==
In July 1951, Fatshan was acquired from Man On by the newly formed Yu On Shipping Company (裕安輪船). Yu On had been founded in that same year by Yuen-Cheong Liang, Ho Yin, and Ho Tim. YC Liang had previously made use of Fatshan in 1945 when he was charged with ferrying relief supplies to Hong Kong from Macao after the end of World War II.

By 1961, competing ferry services on the Hong Kong to Macao route were set up with the establishment of Stanley Ho's Shun Tak Shipping. The competition for the route further escalated in the mid to late 60's with the introduction of hydrofoil ferry services.

== Hong Kong Macao route with the Tai Tak Hing Shipping Company ==
In 1968, Stanley Ho's Tai Tak Hing Shipping Company, a Shun Tak subsidiary, acquired Fatshan together with SS Tai Loi from Yu On and continued sailing the vessel on the Hong Kong Macao route.

=== Sinking ===
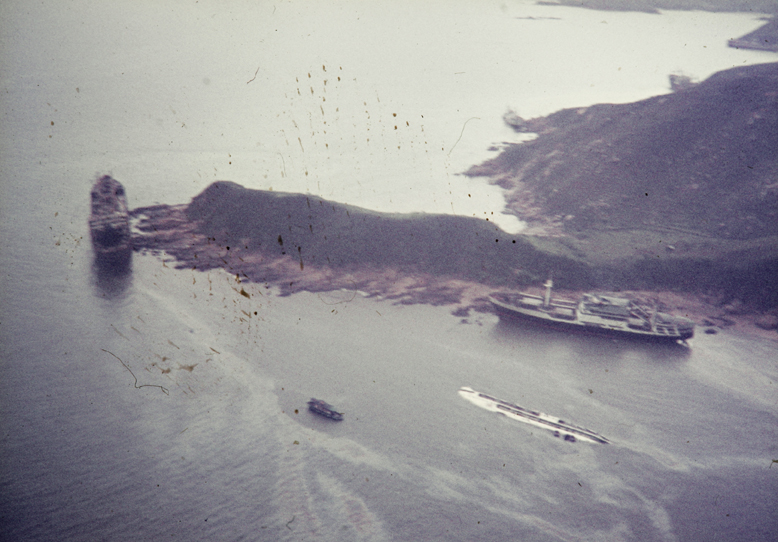
Wreck of Fatshan off Lantau Island taken between August and November 1971 after Typhoon Rose

On 16 August 1971, Fatshan was sailing with a complement of 92 passengers and crew when she was caught in a severe storm brought about by Typhoon Rose. The vessel was forced to anchor off Stonecutters Island due to the heavy winds. During the course of the storm, the ship's anchor was broken and it was apparently struck by several drifting ships causing Fatshan to capsize and sink about 120 metres (390 ft) offshore of Lantau Island at a depth of about 6 metres (20 ft) of water. 88 lives were lost as a result of the sinking. Only four people survived the sinking of Fatshan and the wreck was not discovered until the tide went out and a passing ship found floating bodies.

Salvage rights were sold to Lai Man Yau in September 1971 and operations to raise Fatshan took place over the course of around three months following the disaster.

== See also ==
- Shun Tak Holdings
