= HMAS Poyang =

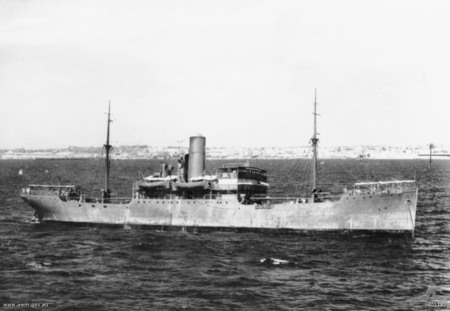
- Cargo steamer Poyang prior to being requisitioned by the Royal Australian Navy in 1942.

History

Australia
- Owner: China Steam Navigation Company
- Builder: Taikoo Dockyard Engineering Company, Hong Kong
- Launched: 10 June 1941
- Commissioned: 6 December 1943
- Decommissioned: 6 March 1946
- Identification: IMO number: 5401388
- Fate: Broken up in 1970

General characteristics
- Class & type: Steamer
- Tonnage: 2,873 GRT
- Length: 299.7 ft (91.3 m)
- Beam: 44.2 ft (13.5 m)
- Draught: 23.1 ft (7.0 m)
- Speed: 13 knots (24 km/h; 15 mph)

HMAS Poyang (FY-20) was a 2,873-ton former steamer that was commissioned into the Royal Australian Navy (RAN) during the Second World War. It was one of a group of vessels known as the "China Fleet", which were acquired by the RAN in similar circumstances.

Built in 1941 for the China Steam Navigation Company, Poyang was acquired by the RAN in 1942, and commissioned into naval service at the end of 1943. Poyang operated with the RAN until 1946, when she was decommissioned and returned to her owners. The ship changed hands several times between 1963 and 1965, and operated under the names Bali Steer and Rosalina. The vessel was scrapped in 1970.

== Design and construction ==
Built by the Taikoo Dockyard Engineering Company, Hong Kong in 1941 for the China Steam Navigation Company.

== Operational history ==
Poyang was requisitioned by the Royal Australian Navy in May 1942. Fitted out as an Armament Stores Issuing Ship and keeping her civilian crew, she plied the east coast of Australia and also was in New Caledonia and New Guinea during 1942.

After a refit Poyang was commissioned into the Royal Australian Navy as HMAS Poyang on 6 December 1943 and served in New Guinea waters in 1944. Sailed as part of the supply force for the Leyte campaign, and was attached to the supply force for the military landings at Lingayen Gulf, however Poyang was not present at the landing. She returned to Australian waters in December 1944 for another refit, then served from early 1945 onwards in New Guinea and Morotai areas.

Poyang was part of the landing on 22 September 1945 of the Australian 33rd Brigade on Ambon for the surrender of Imperial Japanese forces on the island. The vessel left for Australia on 7 January 1946, was paid off on 6 March and later handed back to her owners.

She was sold in February 1963 to Power Navigation, Hong Kong, then resold to Steering Line, Hong Kong and renamed Bali Steer. She was transferred to Steering Line Company, Liberia in May 1964, and delivered to Cia Nav. Viento del Sur, Singapore in June 1965 and renamed Rosalina.

== Fate ==
Rosalina arrived at Singapore on 9 April 1970 and was broken up by National Shipbreakers in July 1970.
