= USS Regulus (AF-57) =

Cargo ship of the United States Navy

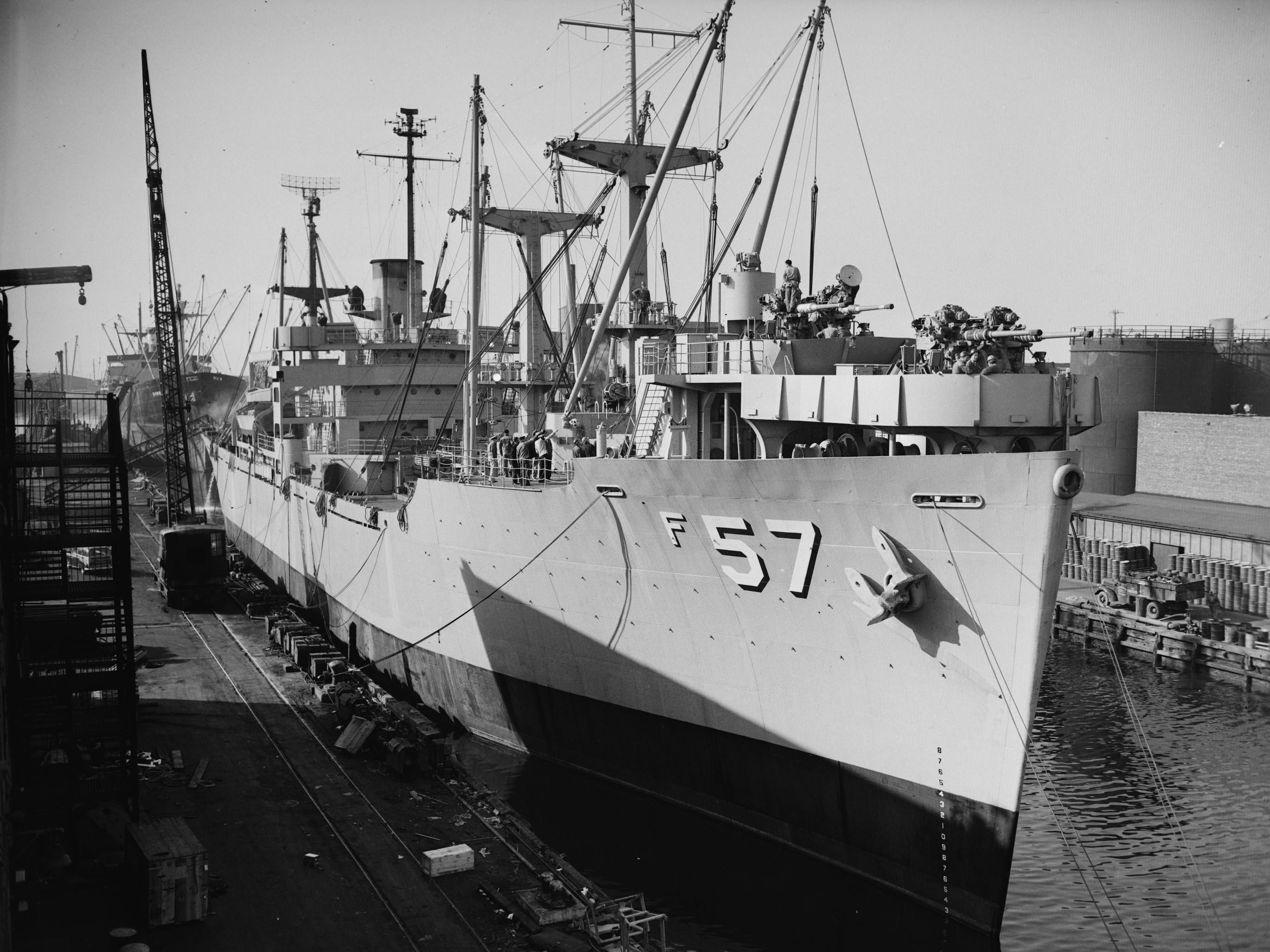
- USS Regulus (AF-57)

History

United States
- Name: Escanaba (1944–1952); Regulus (1952–1971)
- Namesake: Escanaba, Michigan; Regulus constellation
- Owner: War Shipping Administration (1944–1952); US Navy (1952–1971)
- Operator: American South African Line (1944–1948); North American Shipping Company (1948–1950); US Navy (1952–1971)
- Ordered: as SS Escanaba Victory; VC-2-S-AP3 hull, MCV hull 112
- Laid down: 29 April 1944
- Launched: 7 June 1944
- Acquired: 5 May 1952
- Commissioned: 3 February 1954
- Decommissioned: 10 September 1971
- Renamed: Regulus 1952
- Stricken: 10 September 1971
- Fate: Grounded on a reef, damaged beyond economical repair

General characteristics
- Displacement: 4,960 tons(lt) 10,850 tons(fl)
- Length: 455 ft 3 in (138.76 m)
- Beam: 62 ft (19 m)
- Draught: 28 ft 6 in (8.69 m)
- Propulsion: geared steam turbine, single propeller, 8,500 shp
- Speed: 16 kts.
- Complement: 250
- Armament: four twin 3 in (76 mm)/50 dual purpose gun mounts

USS Regulus (AF-57) was a Denebola-class stores ship acquired by the United States Navy. Her task was to carry stores, refrigerated items, and equipment to ships in the fleet, and to remote stations and staging areas.

The second vessel to be named Regulus by the Navy, Regulus was built under United States Maritime Commission contract under the Emergency Shipbuilding program. She was laid down as SS Escanaba Victory (MCV hull 112) by the Oregon Shipbuilding Corporation, Portland, Oregon, 29 April 1944; launched 7 June 1944. She was sponsored by Mrs. Aubrey D. Day; and delivered to the Maritime Commission 29 June 1944.

== SS Escanaba Victory ==
SS Escanaba Victory serviced as a supply cargo ship for World War II. She was operated by the American South African Line under the US Maritime Commission. She served in the Pacific War and participating in the landings on Leyte. Escanaba Victory supported troops in the Leyte landings from 18 Oct. 1944 to 29 Nov. 1944. While under the command of USN Armed Guard CO Lt. Wendell H. Mixson, she earned battle stars for use of her deck guns in defending herself and other US ships against enemy aircraft, including kamikazes. "With every available gun brought to bear and blazing at a Japanese suicide plane which started its swift run on the Escanaba Victory and her dangerous cargo, you and the gallant crew under your command poured a continuous stream of projectiles into the diving craft, remaining steadfast at your stations in the face of almost certain death and holding to the target until it crashed into the sea in flames a short distance off the port quarter. The daring and aggressive fighting spirit displayed by you and your gunners throughout 47 grueling days of combat duty resulted in the destruction or complete rout of numerous hostile aircraft and reflect the highest credit upon the United States Naval Service." In 1948 she was laid up in the National Defense Reserve Fleet at Wilmington, North Carolina. In 1950 she was removed from the Reserve Fleet and repaired. She was operated by the North American Shipping Company for the Maritime Commission to deliver supplies to Korea for the Korean War. The SS Escanaba Victory transported goods, mail, food and other supplies. About 90 percent of the cargo was moved by merchant marine naval to the war zone. SS Escanaba Victory made trips to Korea between 1950 and 1952, helping American forces engaged against Communist aggression in South Korea.

== Acquisition by the U.S. Navy ==
The SS Escanaba Victory was acquired by the Navy from the commission's successor, the United States Maritime Administration, 5 May 1952; converted by the Todd Shipyard, Brooklyn, New York; and commissioned as Regulus (AF-57) on 3 February 1954. She was Commanded by John D. Lautaret.

== Operations ==
Completing initial training and outfitting on the west coast, Regulus, homeported at Alameda, California, loaded at San Francisco, California, and on 8 May 1954 got underway for the Far East. A unit of Service Squadron 3, she operated out of Sasebo and replenished units of the United States Seventh Fleet at sea and in ports from Japan to the Philippines until November when she steamed for the United States. Returning to San Francisco 2 December, she was deployed again 26 February–26 August 1955, extending her range on that tour to ports in Indochina.

== Supporting Vietnam operations ==
From 1955 to 1970 she continued to rotate regularly to the western Pacific Ocean, transporting in 1957 art treasures from Korea to the United States for exhibition. During the early 1960s, her deployed time in the Western Pacific was increased and from 1964 her primary mission was shifted to replenishment of Seventh Fleet units operating off the coast of Vietnam to support the Vietnam War. Her triennial overhaul periods excepted, Regulus, equipped in 1965 with a helicopter deck for vertical replenishment, continued to carry provisions to the units of the United States Pacific Fleet until the night of 16–17 August 1971.

== Grounded on a reef in a typhoon ==
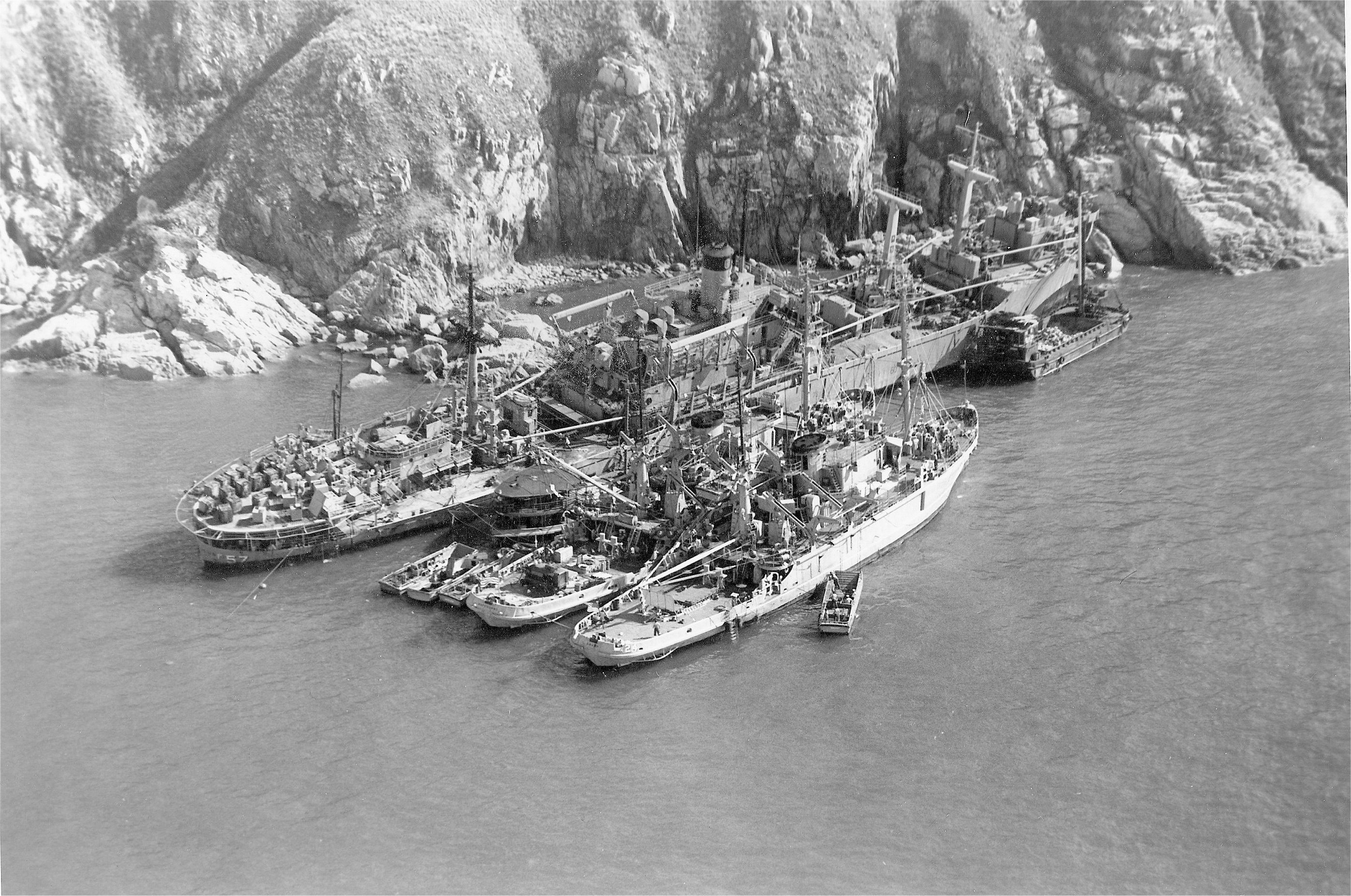
USS Regulus aground in the harbor area of Hong Kong as a result of the typhoon

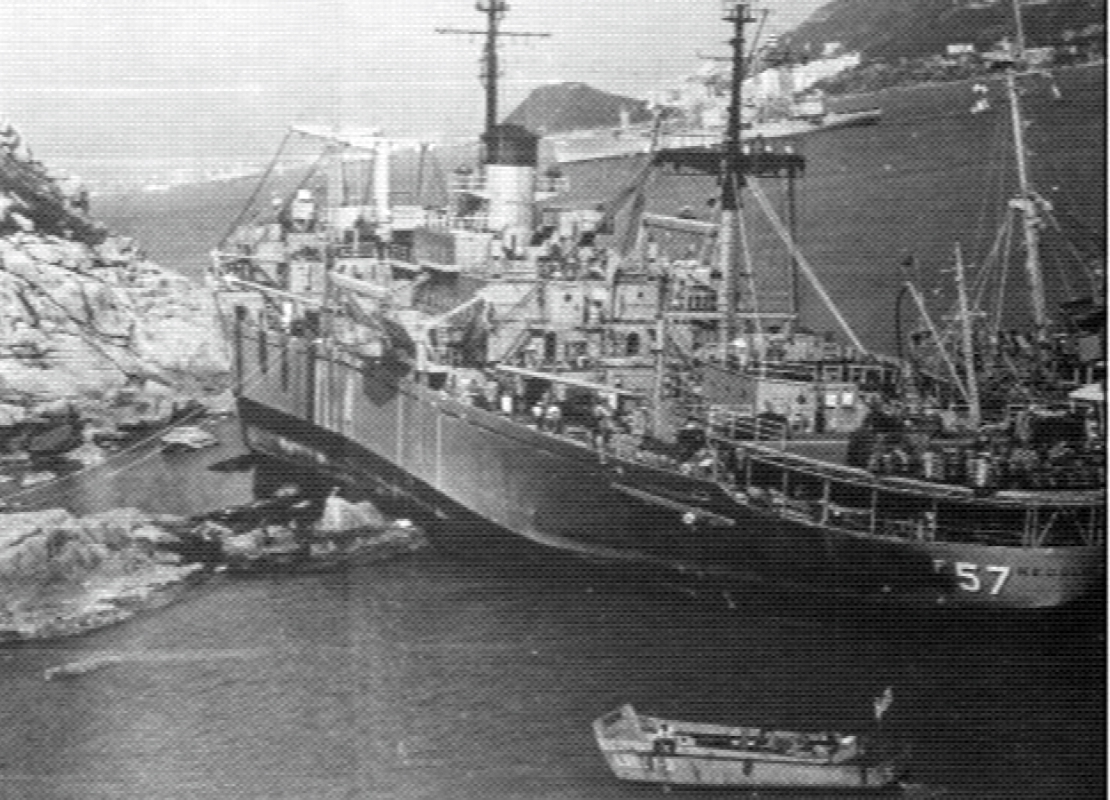
Regulus hard aground in 1971 due to a typhoon: after three weeks of effort, Naval salvors deemed it unsalvageable.

While riding out typhoon Rose at Hong Kong, Regulus grounded on Kau I Chau Island on 17 August 1971, ripping open her hull. After three weeks of attempting to refloat Regulus, it was finally decided that the damage she had incurred was too severe to warrant salvage. The ship was cut up and removed in pieces. Regulus was decommissioned 10 September 1971 and subsequently struck from the Navy List.

== Military awards and honors ==
Regulus’ crew was eligible for the following medals:

- Battle Stars in World War II for war action during Leyte landings
- National Defense Service Medal (2)
- Armed Forces Expeditionary Medal (6-Vietnam)
- Vietnam Service Medal (11)
- Vietnam Campaign Medal
