= SS Samarkand =

World War II Liberty ship of the United States

History
- Name: Peter Cooper (1943); Samarkand (1943-1947); Talthybius (1947-1954); Gleniffer (1954-1958); Dove (1958-1965); Patraic Sky (1965-1971)
- Namesake: Peter Cooper
- Owner: British Government (1943-47); Ocean Steamship Co Ltd (1947-54); Glen Line (1954-58); Colombine Shipping Co (1958-65); Patriarch Steamship Co (1965-71)
- Port of registry: (United States) Baltimore (1943); (United Kingdom) London (1943-47); (United Kingdom) Liverpool (1947-58); (Lebanon) Monrovia (1958-71)
- Builder: Bethlehem-Fairfield Shipyard
- Yard number: 2217
- Laid down: 24 July 1943
- Launched: 25 August 1943
- Completed: September 1943
- Fate: Broken up at Split from 30 March 1971

General characteristics
- Tonnage: 7,000 tons GRT
- Length: 441 ft 6 in (134.57 m)
- Beam: 56 ft 10.75 in (17.34 m)
- Draught: 27 ft 9.25 in (8.46 m)
- Propulsion: Two oil-fired boilers, triple expansion steam engine, single screw, 2500 horsepower (1.9 MW)
- Speed: 11 knots (13 mph; 20 km/h) - 11.5 knots (13.2 mph; 21.3 km/h)
- Capacity: 9,140 tons cargo
- Complement: 41
- Armament: Stern-mounted 4 in (102 mm) deck gun for use against surfaced submarines, variety of anti-aircraft guns.

SS Samarkand (Hull Number 1769, launched as the SS Peter Cooper) was a Liberty ship built in the United States during World War II.

Originally named after Peter Cooper, an American industrialist, inventor and philanthropist, the ship was laid down by Alabama Drydock and Shipbuilding Company on 24 July 1943, then launched on 25 August 1943. She was loaned to Great Britain as part of the Lend-Lease program where she was renamed the SS Samarkand. She was renamed after the Uzbek city of Samarkand. The ship survived the war and was sold into private ownership in 1947. She was scrapped in 1971.
