= HMS Ladybird (1950) =

Royal Navy base ship during the Korean War

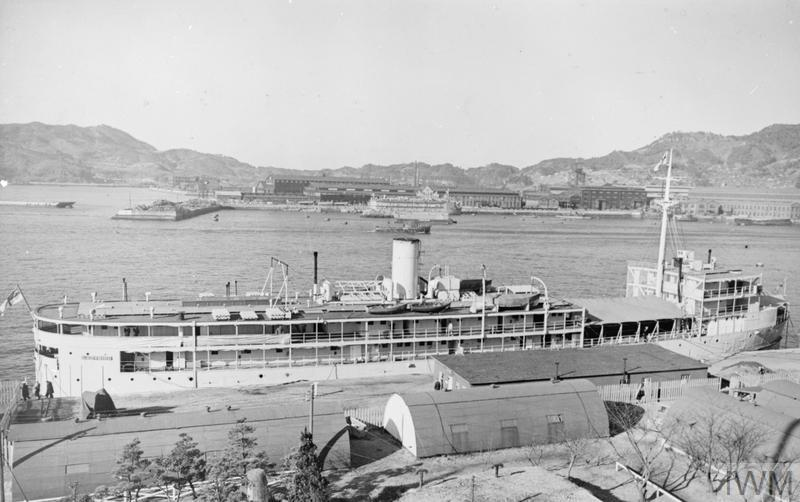
- HMS Ladybird moored at Sasebo in 1951

History

United Kingdom
- Name: HMS Ladybird
- Launched: 1931
- Acquired: 1950
- Decommissioned: 1953
- Fate: Sold for breaking up

General characteristics
- Length: 295 ft 0 in (89.92 m)
- Beam: 46 ft (14 m)
- Propulsion: 2 Sulzer diesel engines, 1,750 BHP
- Speed: 10 knots (12 mph; 19 km/h)

HMS Ladybird started life as MV Wusueh, a ferry built for the lower reaches of the Yangtze River between Shanghai and Hankow, operated by the China Navigation Company (CNCo), run by the British businessman John Samuel Swire.

In 1941 she was requisitioned by the British Ministry of War Transport and used first as a troopship, then as a hospital ship, around Malaya and Burma. In 1946 she was returned to CNCo, refurbished and employed on the Hong Kong – Canton/Macao ferry service.

In 1950, at the outbreak of the Korean War, the Royal Navy bought her, refitted her with communications equipment, renamed her HMS Ladybird and sent her to be moored at the US naval base at Sasebo, Japan, as the Naval Headquarters and Communications vessel for the Commonwealth Blockading forces. At the end of the war she was returned again to CNCo which sold her for breaking up.
