= HMAS Whang Pu =

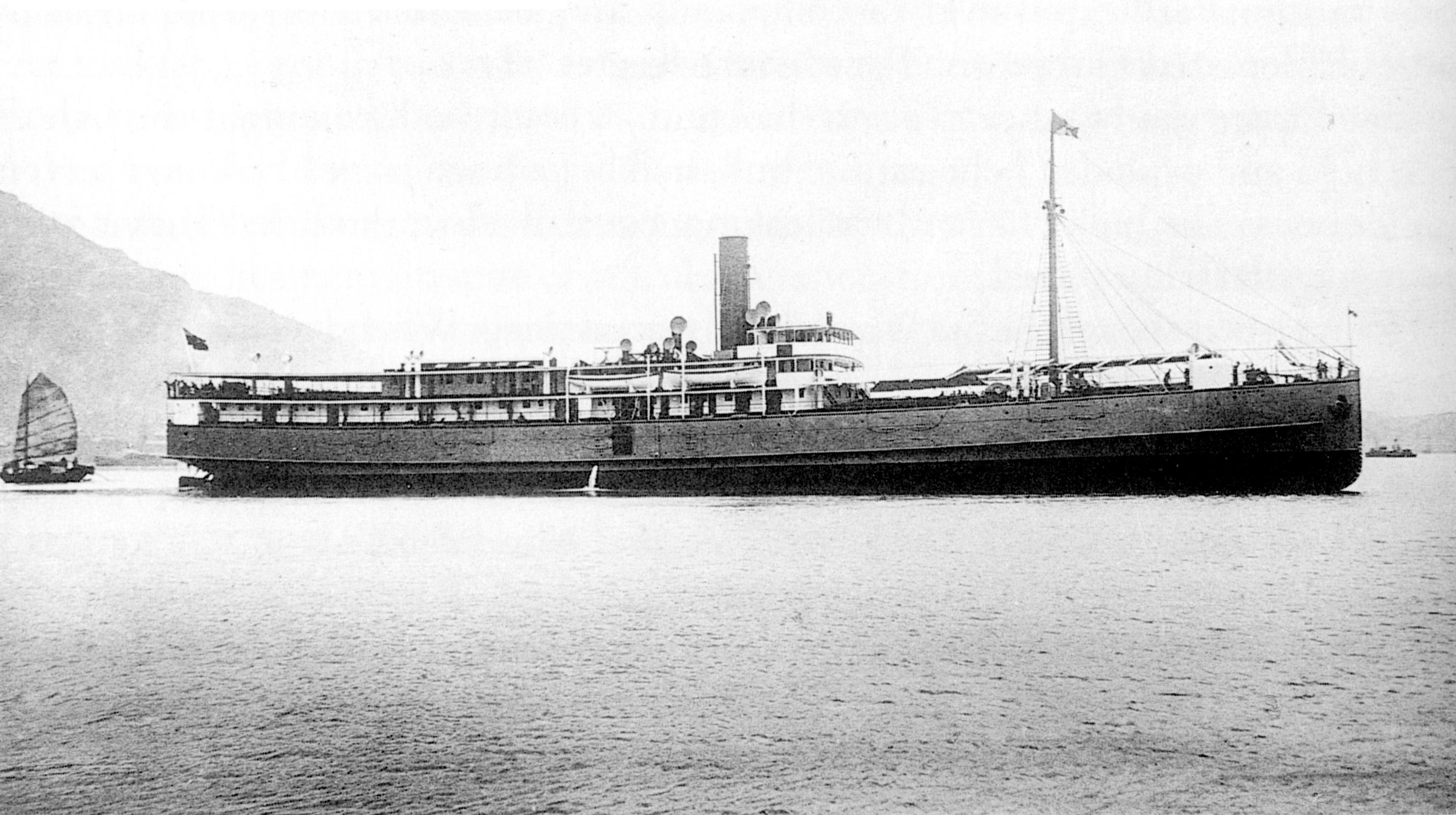
- SS Whang Pu in civilian service

History
- Owner: China Navigation Company
- Operator: John Swire & Sons; (1920–41; 1946–49); (United Kingdom) Royal Australian Navy; (1943–46)
- Port of registry: (United Kingdom) London
- Builder: Taikoo Dockyard, Hong Kong
- Launched: 1920
- Acquired: 31 December 1941
- Commissioned: 1 October 1943
- Decommissioned: 22 April 1946
- Fate: Sold to shipbreakers 1949

General characteristics
- Type: Passenger & cargo liner
- Displacement: 3204 GRT
- Length: 320 ft (98 m)
- Beam: 46.5 ft (14.2 m)
- Draught: 22.3 ft (6.8 m)
- Propulsion: Triple-expansion steam reciprocating engines driving twin screws
- Speed: 10 knots (19 km/h)

HMAS Whang Pu (FY-03), previously Wang Phu, was a 3,204 ton riverboat of the China Navigation Company that was commissioned into the Royal Australian Navy (RAN) in World War II. Her Chinese name translates to "Happy Times". She was one of the Allied Chinese Ships requisitioned for the RAN in similar circumstances.

== Pre-war service ==
Wang Phu was built by the Taikoo Dockyard, Hong Kong in 1920 for the China Navigation Company (CNC). Both Taikoo Dockyard and CNC were owned by John Swire & Sons.

== War service ==
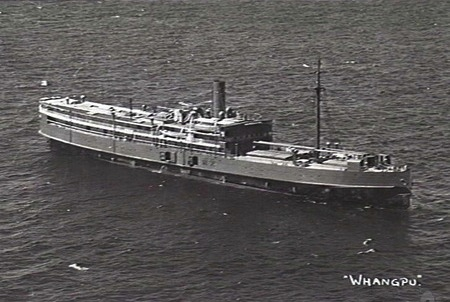
Whang Pu after escaping the Battle of Singapore

The Admiralty requisitioned Whang Pu on 31 December 1941 and work started at Singapore to convert her into a submarine depot ship for the Royal Navy. However, this coincided with the Japanese invasion of Malaya and in January 1942 work on Wang Phu was stopped. She sailed to Fremantle, Western Australia where she served as a depot ship for Royal Netherlands Navy submarine and minesweeper crews.

She was commissioned into the Royal Australian Navy on 1 October 1943 as HMAS Whang Pu and fitted out in Melbourne as a mobile repair ship. She served in New Guinea waters and later at Morotai in the Dutch East Indies as a stores ship. After the war she sailed to Hong Kong where she was paid off on 22 April 1946 and returned to her owners.

== Post-war ==
She was then used as an accommodation ship, and in November 1949 was sold for breaking up.
