= Bo Yang (disambiguation) =

Bo Yang (1920–2008) is a Taiwanese writer.

Boyang is a town in Guangdong Province

Bo Yang or Boyang may also refer to:

- Jin Boyang (born 1997), a Chinese figure skater
- Wei Boyang, a noted Chinese author and Taoist alchemist of the Eastern Han dynasty
- Boyang is also the courtesy name of the following persons:
  - Laozi, a philosopher of ancient China
  - Sun Ben, a military leader in the late Han dynasty
  - Zhao Xi (Han dynasty), a politician of the early Eastern Han dynasty

== See also ==
- Poyang (disambiguation), an alternate transliteration of Chinese name
