= Typhoon Rose (1971) =

Pacific typhoon in 1971

Typhoon Rose (Uring)
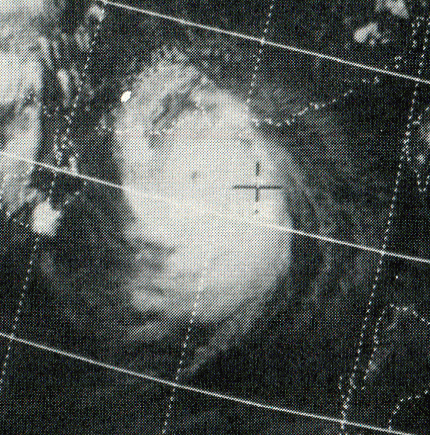
- Typhoon Rose on August 16 over the South China Sea, southwest of Hong Kong

Meteorological history
- Formed: August 9, 1971
- Dissipated: August 17, 1971

Typhoon
- 10-minute sustained (JMA)
- Lowest pressure: 960 hPa (mbar); 28.35 inHg

Category 4-equivalent typhoon
- 1-minute sustained (SSHWS/JTWC)
- Highest winds: 220 km/h (140 mph)
- Lowest pressure: 950 hPa (mbar); 28.05 inHg

Overall effects
- Fatalities: 134 total
- Areas affected: Philippines, Hong Kong, eastern China
- IBTrACS
- Part of the 1971 Pacific typhoon season

Typhoon Rose, known in the Philippines as Typhoon Uring, was the most violent and intense tropical cyclone to strike Hong Kong since Typhoon Wanda in 1962. The 21st named storm of the 1971 Pacific typhoon season, Rose developed from an area of disturbed weather while west of Guam on August 9. Moving west-northwestward, the storm briefly became a typhoon on the following day. After weakening to a tropical storm on August 11, Rose re-intensified into a typhoon several hours later. The system then curved westward and reached a primary peak intensity with winds of 205 km/h (127 mph) on August 13. Later that day, the typhoon made landfall near Palanan, Isabela in the Philippines. Rose weakened significantly while crossing the island of Luzon and was a minimal typhoon upon reaching the South China Sea on August 14.

The storm intensified significantly and re-curved northwestward in response to a weakening high-pressure area. Early on August 16, Rose attained its maximum sustained wind speed of 220 km/h (140 mph) – equivalent to a Category 4 hurricane on the National Hurricane Center's Saffir–Simpson hurricane wind scale. Later that day, a ship observed the typhoon's minimum barometric pressure of 950 mbar (28 inHg). Thereafter, the storm weakened slightly before making landfall at Lantau Island, Hong Kong, with winds of 165 km/h (103 mph) late on August 16. Rose rapidly weakened to a tropical storm early the following day and dissipated several hours later.

Mostly minor wind impact was recorded in the Philippines, limited to downed communication lines and damaged houses. Offshore Hong Kong, storm surge and heavy waves sank or severely damaged at least 300 boats, causing 110 deaths and 283 injuries. Inland, heavy rainfall flooded low-lying areas and resulted in numerous landslides. A fire ignited at a large power sub-station in Kwun Tong and was difficult to extinguish due to strong winds. The fire caused blackouts in Kowloon Peninsula and New Territories, trapping thousands of people in elevators. A total of 5,644 people were left homeless, while 653 huts were destroyed. Approximately 30,000 telephones became out of service. Twenty other fatalities occurred in Hong Kong.

== Meteorological history ==
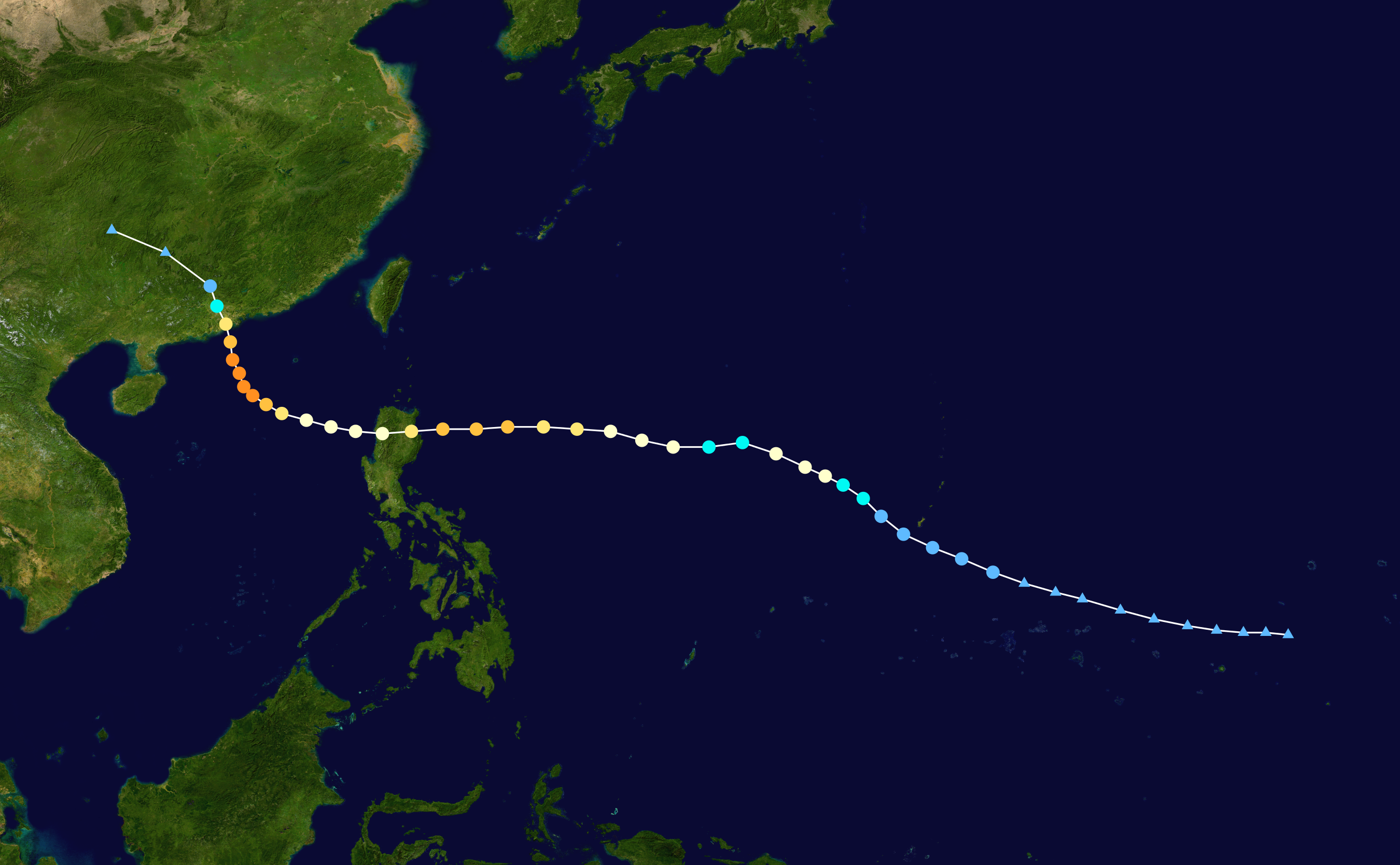
Map plotting the storm's track and intensity, according to the Saffir–Simpson scale Map key Saffir–Simpson scale Tropical depression (≤38 mph, ≤62 km/h) Tropical storm (39–73 mph, 63–118 km/h) Category 1 (74–95 mph, 119–153 km/h) Category 2 (96–110 mph, 154–177 km/h) Category 3 (111–129 mph, 178–208 km/h) Category 4 (130–156 mph, 209–251 km/h) Category 5 (≥157 mph, ≥252 km/h) Unknown Storm type Tropical cyclone Subtropical cyclone Extratropical cyclone, remnant low, tropical disturbance, or monsoon depression

On August 6, the Japan Meteorological Agency (JMA) began monitoring an area of disturbed weather in the vicinity of the Federated States of Micronesia. By early the next day, satellite imagery indicated the presence of a small circulation north of Chuuk. Radars at Fleet Weather Central and Andersen Air Force Base on Guam detected spiral convective bands crossing the island on August 9. At 00:00 UTC the following day, the system developed into Tropical Storm Rose while located 110 mi (180 km) west of Guam. Around that time, a reconnaissance aircraft flight indicated a "mini-storm" with sustained winds between 40 and 45 mph (64 and 72 km/h). Initially, Rose moved west-northwestward at about 13 mph (21 km/h). The storm was a small cyclone, covering an area of 100–150 mi (160–240 km). Rose quickly strengthened and became a typhoon around 12:00 UTC on August 10. Early the following day, the system briefly weakened back to a tropical storm, before re-acquiring typhoon status hours later.

Rose intensified further while tracking generally westward at 16 mph (26 km/h). Around midday on August 13, the typhoon attained a primary peak intensity with winds of 125 mph (201 km/h), equivalent to a Category 3 hurricane on the Saffir–Simpson hurricane wind scale. Rose weakened slightly before making landfall in Palanan, Isabela, Philippines, with winds of 110 mph (180 km/h). The storm weakened further while crossing island of Luzon and emerged into the South China Sea early on August 14 as a minimal typhoon. Rose immediately began to re-intensify. A high-pressure area that had steered the typhoon for the last several days weakened significantly, causing Rose to re-curving northwestward and decelerated to a forward speed of 8 mph (13 km/h). Deepening continued, with the typhoon peaking with maximum sustained winds of 140 mph (230 km/h) – equal to a Category 4 hurricane on the Saffir–Simpson hurricane wind scale – early on August 16. Later that day, a ship in the vicinity of the eye observed a barometric pressure of 950 mbar (28 inHg) – the lowest in relation to the cyclone.

At around 12:00 UTC on August 16, reports from the JTWC indicate that Rose weakened slightly while approaching the Hong Kong and the coast of China. Hours later, the storm made landfall at Lantau Island with winds of 105 mph (169 km/h). Rose was the most intense typhoon to strike Hong Kong since Wanda in 1962. Moving inland, the system rapidly weakened to a tropical storm early on August 17 and dissipated shortly thereafter.

== Preparations ==
In Hong Kong and the Royal Observatory, a strong wind signal, no. 3, was hoisted at 13:05 UTC on August 16. That day, the Royal Observatory warned that because of the small size of Rose, winds might increase rapidly. The storm signal, no. 7, was raised at 05:50 UTC on August 17. Less than three hours later, the storm signal was changed to no. 8.

== Impact ==
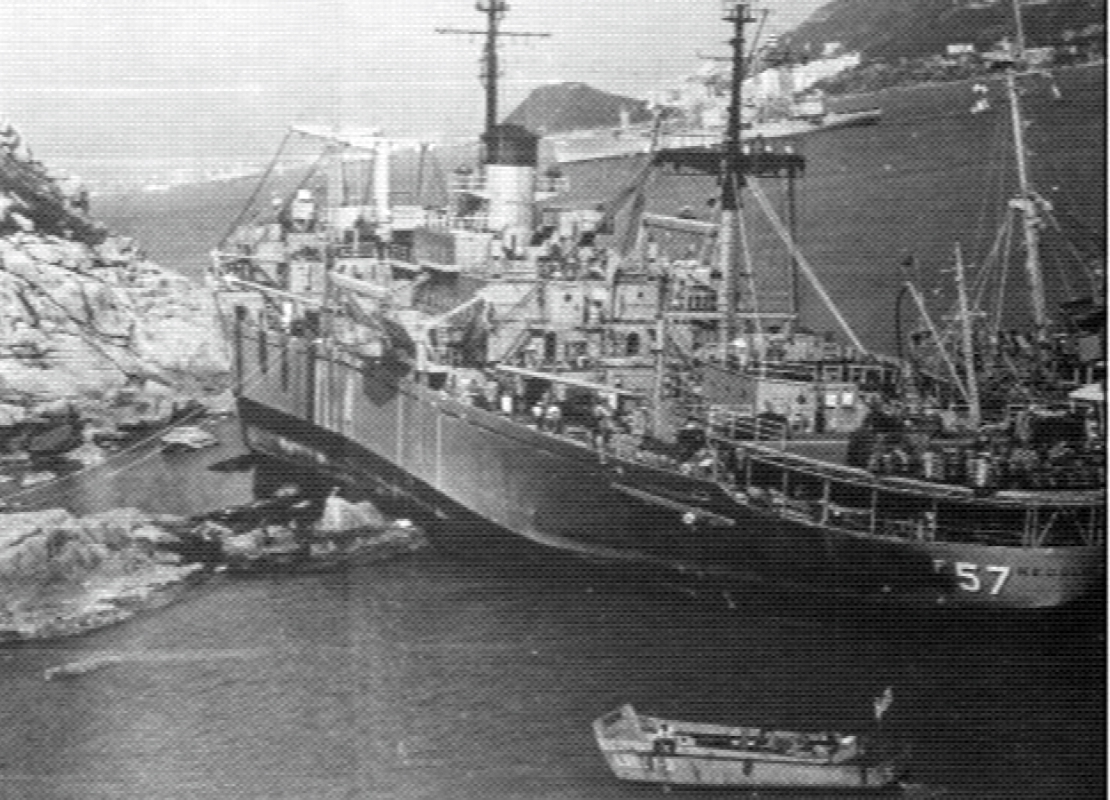
USS Regulus, a U.S. Navy ship, aground in the harbor area of Hong Kong as a result of the typhoon

In the Philippines, a Philippine Atmospheric, Geophysical and Astronomical Services Administration (PAGASA) station in Tuguegarao observed sustained winds speeds up to 86 mph (138 km/h). However, impact was relatively minor, with Luzon escaping serious damage. Downed communication lines and damage to houses were reported.

Rose produced a fog bank before making landfall, which is unusual for a tropical cyclone. The storm was the strongest cyclone to strike Hong Kong since Typhoon Wanda in 1962. Along the coast, the typhoon generated waves of 9.5 m (31 ft) and a storm surge of 0.375 m (1.23 ft) was recorded in Lantau. The storm surge and heavy waves proved dangerous to ships offshore, at least 300 boats sank or were badly damaged by the typhoon. Eighty-eight deaths occurred after the Hong Kong-Macau ferry SS Fatshan capsized. The USS Regulus, a United States Navy vessel, was among the ships that suffered damage. Three United States Seventh Fleet rescue ships searched for survivors. Additionally, Royal Navy minesweepers and Royal Air Force whirlwind helicopters also arrived at Hong Kong, with the latter coordinating with the marine police. Overall, the sinking ships resulted in 110 fatalities, as well as 300 injuries.

Strong winds were reported, including a gust up to 278 km/h (173 mph) at Tai Mo Shan. Many scaffolds, signboards, trees, and boughs were knocked down. Fire broke out around 15:00 UTC on August 16 at a large power sub-station in Kwun Tong. Due to the strong winds, firefighters were unable to sometimes unable to control the flames. By 16:30 UTC, the fire was put out. However, it triggered power outages, with blackouts in the Kowloon Peninsula and New Territories. Thousands of people were trapped in elevators during the widespread electrical failures. Heavy rainfall was also recorded, with up to 161.7 mm (6.37 in) of precipitation. Several low-lying areas were flooded. Numerous landslides blocked approximately 110 roads, 30 of which were severely obstructed. One landslide buried four children after crashing into their village hut, killing two, while one survived and was taken to the hospital, and the fourth remained missing.

A total of 5,644 people – approximately 1,032 families – were left homeless, with 653 huts destroyed. Twenty-four buildings were damaged, with six beyond repair or demolished. Communications were disrupted, with 30,000 telephones out of service. Hundreds of pigs and over 40,000 chickens as well as other poultry were killed. Roughly 1,356 hectares of vegetable and garden crops damaged. Additionally, 20,000 fruit trees were blown down. Considerable loss of pond fish due to overflow was also reported. On land, Rose was attributed to 24 fatalities.

== See also ==
- Typhoon Wanda (1962) – one of the most intense tropical cyclones on record in Hong Kong
