= SS Shuntien (1934) =

Cargo and passenger ship

Coordinates: 32°04′N 24°28′E

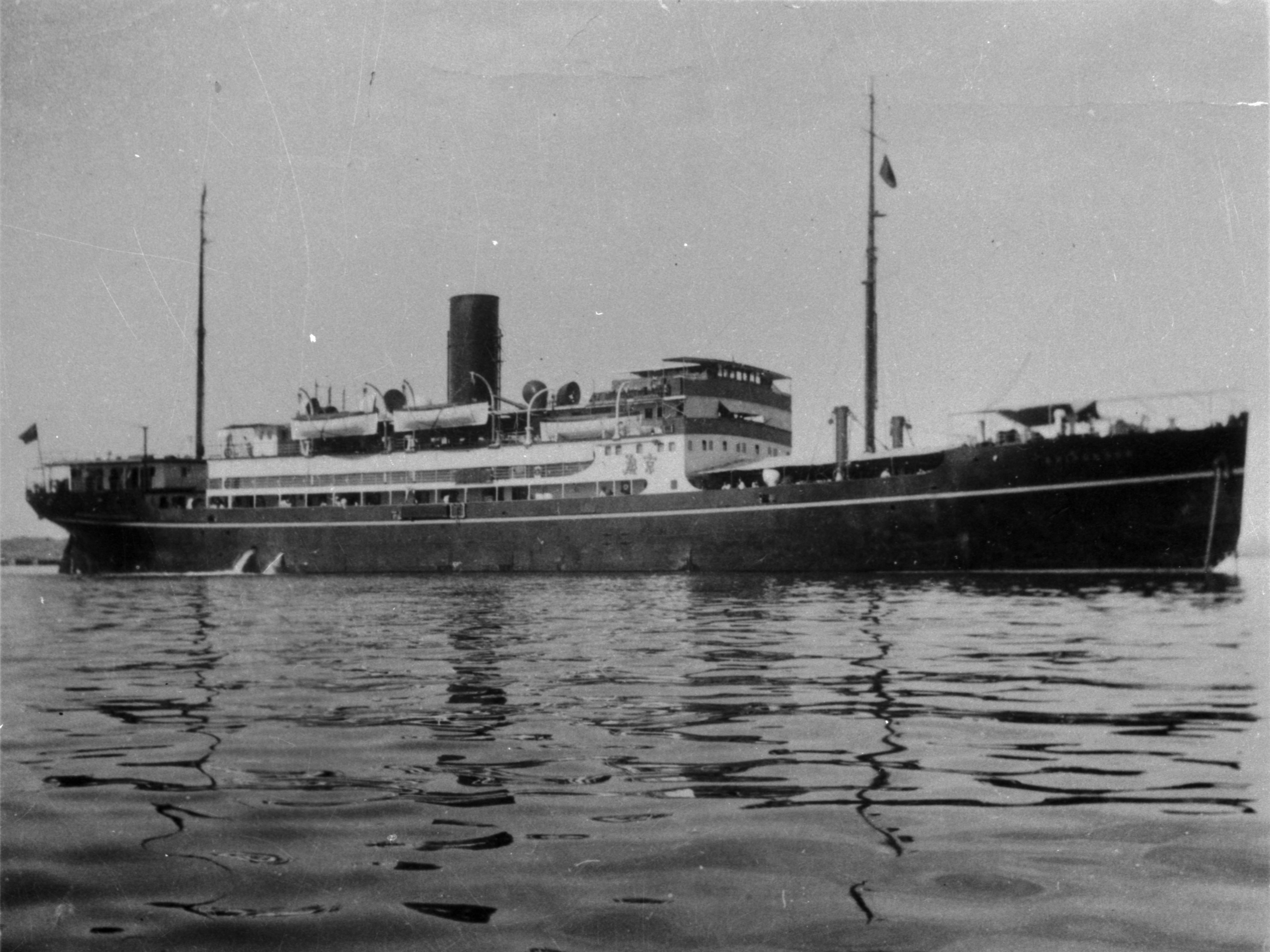
- SS Shuntien in civilian service, 1934–41; The icebreaker shape of her bow is clearly visible

History

Hong Kong
- Name: Shuntien
- Namesake: Shuntian (順天), a Ming Dynasty name for Beijing
- Owner: China Navigation Co, Ltd
- Operator: John Swire & Sons, Ltd
- Port of registry: (United Kingdom) London
- Route: Shanghai – Tianjin coastal service
- Builder: Taikoo Dockyard & Engineering Co
- Yard number: 264
- Completed: 1934
- In service: 1934
- Out of service: 23 December 1941
- Identification: UK official number 154092; Call sign GWSC
- Fate: Torpedoed and sunk, 23 December 1941

General characteristics
- Type: Passenger and cargo liner
- Tonnage: 3,059 GRT; 2,194 tonnage under deck; 1,570 NRT
- Length: 303.7 ft (92.6 m)
- Beam: 46.1 ft (14.1 m)
- Depth: 23.1 ft (7.0 m)
- Installed power: 3,400 shp
- Propulsion: Twin steam turbines; single reduction geared to drive a single screw
- Speed: 12 knots (22 km/h); or 16 knots (30 km/h)
- Capacity: (in civilian service): 39 saloon; 20 cabin; 52 2nd class; 60 3rd class
- Crew: 70 crew, plus (in WW2); 18 DEMS gunners
- Sensors & processing systems: direction finding
- Armament: (as DEMS); 1 × QF 12 pounder gun; 4 × Oerlikon 20 mm cannon; 4 × Marlin M1895/14 machine guns; 2 × Lewis guns
- Notes: sister ship: Shengking

SS Shuntien was a 3,059 GRT coastal passenger and cargo liner of the British-owned The China Navigation Company Ltd (CNC). She was built in Hong Kong in 1934 and sunk by enemy action in the Mediterranean Sea with great loss of life in 1941. A Royal Navy corvette rescued most of Shuntien's survivors, but a few hours later the corvette too was sunk and no-one survived.

== Peacetime service ==
Taikoo Dockyard and Engineering Company in Hong Kong built Shuntien for CNC in 1934. She replaced an earlier and smaller SS Shuntien that Scotts at Greenock on the Firth of Clyde had built in 1904 and that was scrapped in 1935. The new Shuntien was a sister ship of SS Shengking, which Scotts had built in 1931. Both Taikoo Dockyard and CNC were owned by John Swire and Sons Ltd, which is British-owned but based in Hong Kong.

The new Shuntien's engines were steam turbines built by Taikoo Dockyard. She was built to trade along the coast of China, where her relatively shallow draught enabled her to turn in the Hai River at Tianjin and her icebreaker bow equipped her against sea ice in northern waters.

In 1937 Shuntien returned to Taikoo Dockyard for maintenance, and while she was there the Great Hong Kong Typhoon of 1937 blew her ashore. She survived, was refloated and returned to service.

== War service and sinking ==
Approximate position of Shuntien's wreck: just off the coast of Cyrenaica east of Tobruk

In the Second World War the British government requisitioned Shuntien and converted her into a Defensively-Equipped Merchant Ship (DEMS). Photographs of Shuntien taken about that time by a US photographer, Harrison Forman, show Shuntien in the Port of Shanghai apparently being converted into a prison ship. Shuntien moved to the Mediterranean, where her British officers supplemented her Chinese crew with Arab and Maltese recruits.

In the Western Desert Campaign in December 1941 Shuntien left Tobruk in Cyrenaica, eastern Libya as a member of Convoy TA 5 bound for Alexandria in Egypt. She was carrying between 800 and 1,000 Italian and German prisoners of war, guarded by more than 40 soldiers of the Durham Light Infantry (DLI).

At about 19:02 on the evening of 23 December the Type VIIC German submarine U-559 torpedoed Shuntien, blowing off her stern and killing her captain, four officers and chief steward. Her bow rose in the air and she sank within five minutes without having been able to launch any of her lifeboats.

A convoy escort, the Flower-class corvette HMS Salvia, rescued Shuntien's Master, William Shinn, 46 of the ship's officers and men and an unknown number of her prisoners, DEMS gunners and DLI guards. The total number of survivors that Salvia rescued was about 100. The Hunt-class destroyer HMS Heythrop rescued a smaller number: between 11 and 19.

A few hours later, at about 01:35 A.m. On 24 December, U-568 torpedoed Salvia about 100 nautical miles (190 km) west of Alexandria. The torpedo broke the corvette in two and poured burning bunker oil onto the sea; no-one survived. The small party of survivors aboard Heythrop was landed at Alexandria. It included only one of Shuntien's officers, Second Engineer John Hawkrigg.

== See also ==
- RMS Nova Scotia — torpedoed November 1942 while carrying Italian prisoners of war and interned civilians
