= SS Talthybius (1911) =

10,224 GRT Cargo liner

History
- Name: Talthybius (1911–42); Taruyasu Maru (1942–45); Empire Evenlode (1945–49)
- Owner: Ocean Steamship Co Ltd (1911–42); Japanese Government (1942–45); Ministry of War Transport (1945); Ministry of Transport (1945–49)
- Operator: A Holt & Co Ltd (1912–42); Imperial Japanese Navy (1942–45); A Holt & Co Ltd (1945–49)
- Port of registry: Liverpool, United Kingdom (1911–42); Japan (1942–45); United Kingdom (1945–49)
- Builder: Scotts Shipbuilding & Engineering Co Ltd
- Launched: 7 November 1911
- Completed: February 1912
- Maiden voyage: 4 February 1912
- Identification: United Kingdom Official Number 131411 (1911–42, 1945–49); Code Letters HVDQ (1912–34)
- Fate: Scrapped

General characteristics
- Class & type: Cargo liner
- Tonnage: 10,224 GRT (1911–34); 10,245 GRT (1934–49); 6,514 NRT (1911–34); 6,492 NRT (1934–49)
- Length: 506 ft 0 in (154.23 m)
- Beam: 60 ft 3 in (18.36 m)
- Draught: 26 ft 3 in (8.00 m)
- Depth: 39 ft 5 in (12.01 m)
- Installed power: 586 nhp
- Propulsion: 6-cylinder triple expansion steam engine, twin screw propellers
- Speed: 12 knots (22 km/h)
- Armament: 1 x 4-in or 4.7 in gun, 1 x Bofors gun, 4 x machine guns, 1 x kite (Talthybius, WWII)

Talthybius was a 10,224 GRT Cargo liner that was built in 1911 by Scotts Shipbuilding & Engineering Co Ltd, Greenock, Renfrewshire, United Kingdom for a British shipping line. She was sunk at Singapore in an air raid in 1942. Salvaged by the Japanese, she was renamed Taruyasu Maru, serving with the Imperial Japanese Navy until 1945 when she either struck a mine off Sado Island and sank or was sunk in an attack by aircraft of Task Force 38. She was salvaged by the British, passed to the Ministry of War Transport (MoWT) and renamed Empire Evenlode. She served until 1949, when she was scrapped.

== Description ==
The ship was built in 1911 by Scotts Shipbuilding & Engineering Co Ltd, Greenock, Renfrewshire. She was yard number 436.

The ship was 506 feet 0 inches (154.23 m) long, with a beam of 60 feet 3 inches (18.36 m). She had a depth of 39 feet 5 inches (12.01 m), and a draught of 22 feet 3 inches (6.78 m). She was assessed at 10,224 GRT, 6,514 NRT.

The ship was propelled by a 586 nhp six-cylinder triple expansion steam engine, which had three pairs of cylinders of 28 inches (71 cm) inches, 38 1/2 inches (98 cm) and 65 inches (170 cm) diameter by 48 inches (120 cm) stroke. The engine was built by Scotts and drove twin screw propellers. It could propel the ship at a speed of 12 knots (22 km/h).

== History ==
Talthybius was launched on 7 November 1911, and completed in 1912. The United Kingdom Official Number 131411 and Code Letters HVDQ were allocated. Her port of registry was Liverpool, Lancashire. She was built to serve on the United Kingdom – Australia route. She was completed in February 1912, leaving Liverpool on her maiden voyage on 4 February, bound for Vancouver, British Columbia, Canada. In November 1914, Talthybius was engaged in transporting 1,000 Chinese from the United States to Hong Kong to spend Christmas there with their families. On arrival at Kobe, Japan on 23 July 1925, 62 Chinese crew deserted the ship. At 03:00 (local time) on 23 August 1925, Talthybius was in collision with the Chinese fishing junk 1605 off Waglan Island, Hong Kong. 1605 was sunk; a Court of Inquiry found that she was not showing any lights and Talthybius was cleared of any blame for the collision.

From 1934, Talthybius was recorded as holding a passenger certificate. She was then assessed as 10,254 GRT, 6,492 NRT. With the changes to Code Letters in 1934, Talthybius was allocated the letters GPZN. For a couple of years in the 1930s, Talthybius was used as an accommodation ship at Birkenhead, Cheshire.

On 11 April 1939, Talthybius suffered an explosion in one of her coal bunkers which blew off two hatches and injured four firemen. She anchored in the Royal Roads off San Francisco, California, United States, for inspection. She was allowed to continue her voyage from Vancouver, British Columbia, Canada to Hong Kong. In 1939, and again in 1940, Talthybius carried gold bullion worth £1,000,000 from Hong Kong to Canada. Talthybius was a member of Convoy HX 102, which departed from Halifax, Nova Scotia, Canada on 11 January 1941 and arrived at Liverpool on 29 January. She was carrying general and special cargo. She was a member of Convoy OB 297, which departed from Liverpool on 12 March and dispersed at sea on 17 March. Talthybius was bound for Halifax and Saint John, New Brunswick with general cargo. She was due to return with Convoy HX 119, but did not join that convoy. Talthybius joined Convoy HX 120, which departed from Halifax on 10 April and arrived at Liverpool on 29 April. She was carrying general cargo and 500 long tons (510,000 kg) of TNT. On 4 May, Talthybius was damaged in an air raid on Liverpool. She suffered further damage in another raid four days later.

Talthybius was a member of Convoy OB 330, which departed from Liverpool on 2 June and dispersed at sea on 7 June. She was bound for Montreal, Quebec, Canada. She returned with Convoy HX 136, which departed from Halifax on 30 June and arrived at Liverpool on 18 July. Talthybius was carrying general cargo and shells. She also carried the Convoy Commodore, who described the ship as "efficient and well manned" with "a good fighting spirit". She was only able to fly a kite when the wind was from the starboard due to only having one fitting for kites. The commodore recommended that she be equipped to fly kites from both sampson posts.

Talthybius was a member of Convoy ON 3, which departed from Liverpool on 31 July and dispersed at sea on 14 August. She was carrying a number of passengers bound for Montreal. She returned with Convoy HX 148, which departed from Halifax on 4 September and arrived at Liverpool on 17 September. Talthybius was carrying general cargo.

Talthybius then sailed to Holyhead, Anglesey, from where she departed on 30 September to join Convoy BB 82, which had departed from the Belfast Lough on that day and arrived at Milford Haven, Pembrokeshire on 1 October. She then sailed on to Cardiff, Glamorgan, arriving the next day. She returned to Milford Haven, from where she departed on 12 October to join Convoy OS 9, which sailed from Liverpool on 13 October and arrived at Freetown, Sierra Leone on 1 November. Talthybius was carrying general cargo bound for Alexandria, Egypt. She was armed with a 4-inch or 4.7-inch gun, a Bofors gun, four machine guns and a kite.

Talthybius was a member of Convoy BM 10, which departed from Bombay, India on 8 January 1942 and arrived at Singapore on 25 January. She was carrying a cargo described as "stores", which included lorries and tanks. On 3 February 1942, two direct hits were scored on Talthybius during a Japanese air raid on Singapore and she was set on fire. She was declared to be unseaworthy and abandoned, sinking in the Empire Dock, to where she had been moved following the raid. The officers and European crew from Talthybius formed part of the crew of HMAS Ping Wo, which took 600 refugees from Singapore to Java, Indonesia and then towed HMAS Vendetta from Tanjung Priok, Indonesia to Fremantle, Australia. The Chinese crewmembers decided to take their chances in Singapore.

Talthybius was salvaged by the Japanese, repaired and returned to service as Taruyasu Maru, operated by the Imperial Japanese Navy. The fate of Taruyasu Maru is unclear, as conflicting accounts state that either she struck a mine off Sado Island, Japan (37°07′N 137°04′E}) and sank 30 June 1945, or she was sunk by United States Navy aircraft from Task Force 38 in Maizuru Bay, Japan on 30 July 1945. She was salvaged by the British and repaired. Passed to the MoWT, she was renamed Empire Evenlode. She was again placed under the management of A Holt & Co Ltd. On 1 December 1945, she started the voyage back to the United Kingdom. This took until 8 May 1946 to complete due to the poor condition of the ship. Empire Evenlode served until 1949, when she was scrapped at Briton Ferry, Glamorgan.
