= China Navigation Company =

Shipping company based in Singapore

The China Navigation Company Limited
- Trade name: Swire Shipping; Swire Bulk
- Company type: Liner, dry bulk shipping, project cargo shipping, landside logistics, and integrated logistics
- Industry: Shipping
- Founded: 1872
- Founder: John Samuel Swire
- Headquarters: Singapore
- Key people: Sam Swire (Chairman); Swire Shipping: Jeremy Sutton (CEO); Swire Bulk: Peter Norborg (CEO)
- Parent: Swire
- Website: www.swirecnco.com www.swireshipping.com www.swirebulk.com www.swireprojects.com

The China Navigation Company Limited (CNCo) is a London-based holding company of merchant shipping companies Swire Shipping Pte Ltd and Swire Bulk Pte Ltd, both of which are headquartered in Singapore.

The Swire flag is also the house flag of the China Navigation Company

CNCo is a subsidiary of Swire. Swire Shipping was formerly known as the China Navigation Company until October 2021, when it was renamed.

== History ==
=== 1872–1945: Yangtze River origins ===
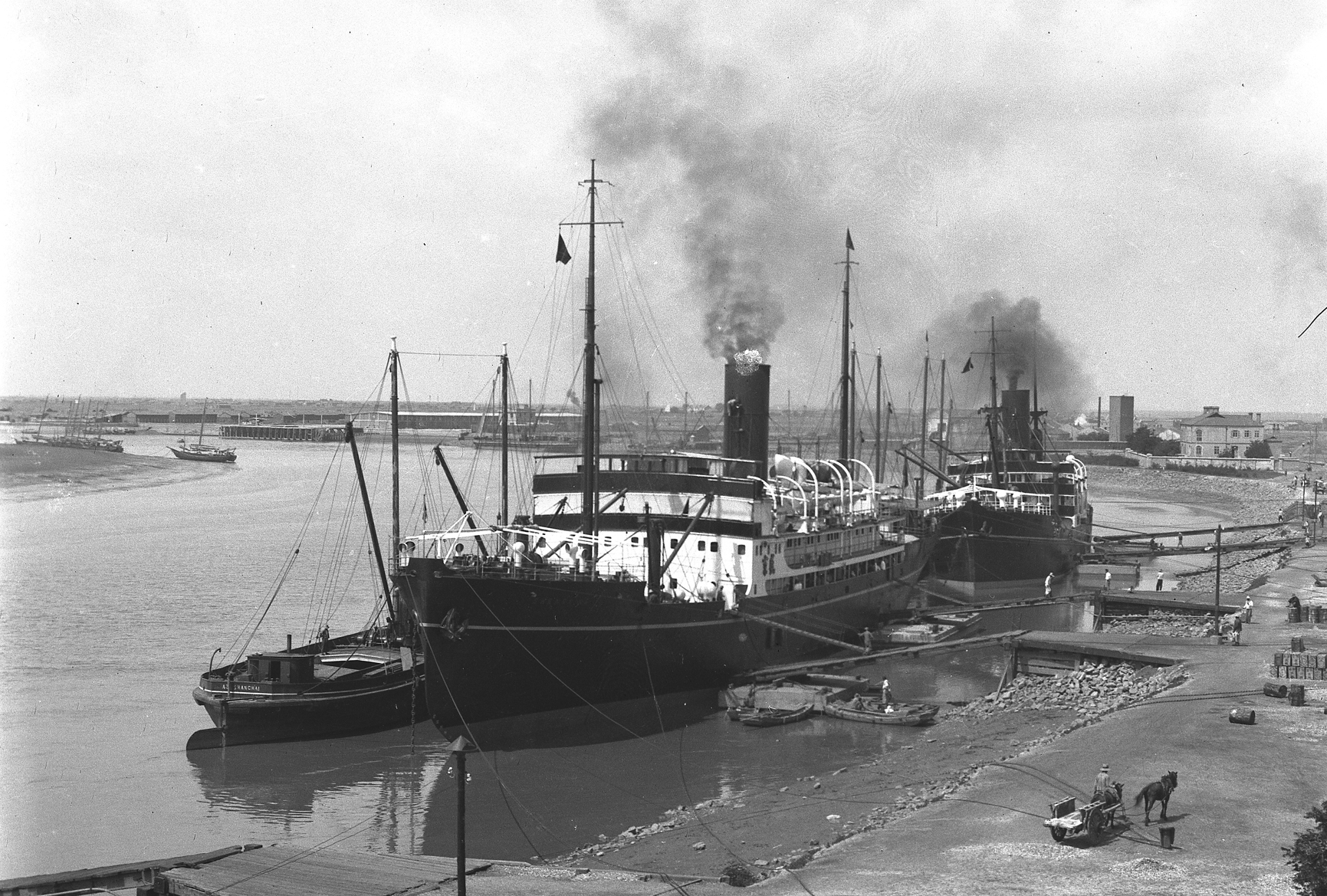
Scotts of Greenock, Scotland built the coastal steamship SS Shenking for CNCo in 1931

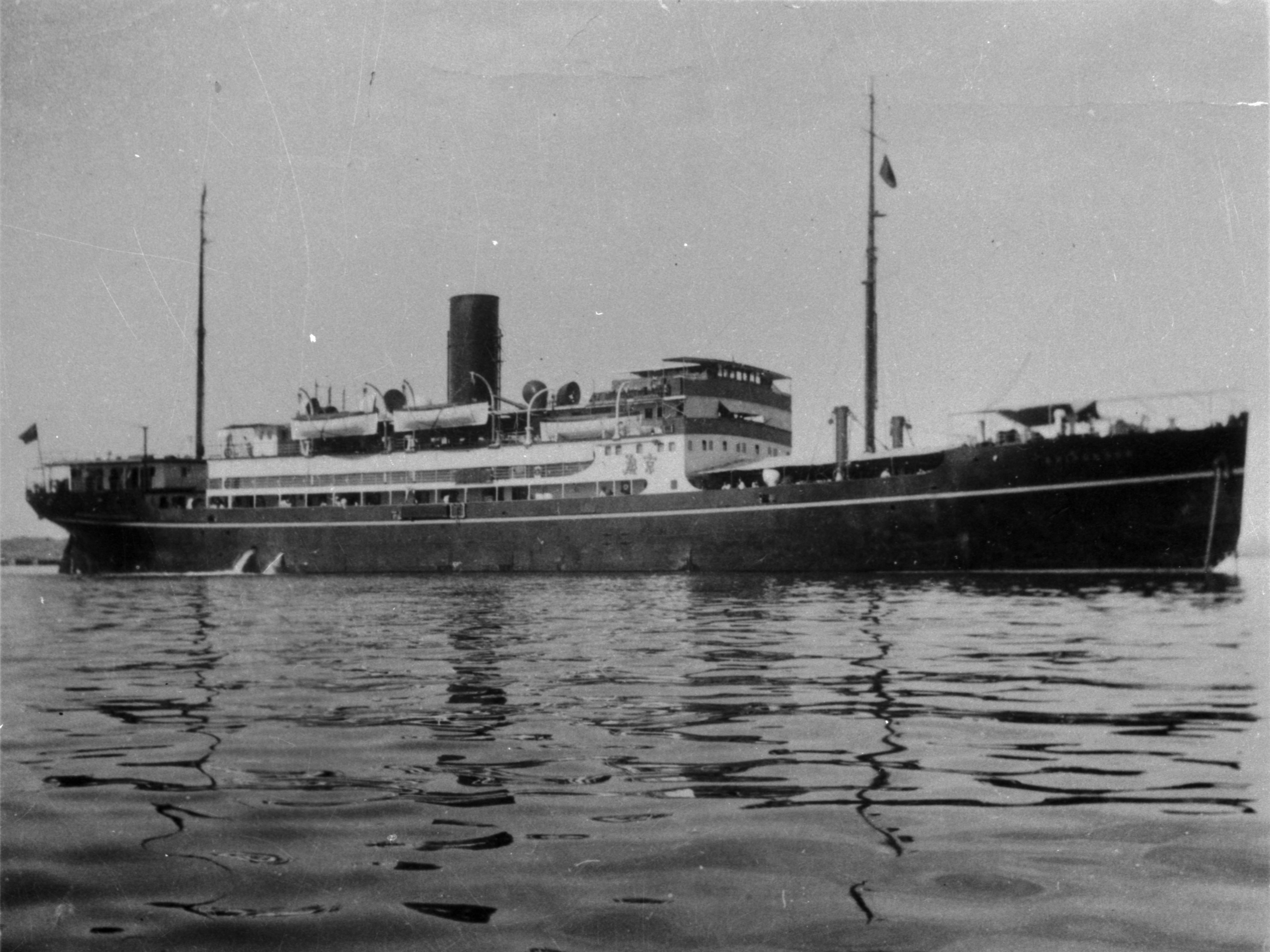
Taikoo Dockyard built SS Shuntien in Hong Kong in 1934. She was SS Shengking's sister ship.

Founded in London in 1872 by John Samuel Swire, CNCo was established with the intent of providing paddle steamer services on the Yangtze River. The company was started with an initial investment of £360,000 provided primarily by John Samuel Swire and William Hudson Swire, along with other shareholders, including the father of James Henry Scott of Scotts' Shipbuilding.

John Swire and Sons (JS&S) initially commissioned the construction of three ships for trade on the Lower Yangtze in 1873. That same year, they also purchased the Union Steam Navigation Company, which included CNCo's first two ships, Tunsin and Glengyle, along with property leases in Shanghai and other river ports. Later in 1873 and in 1874, the three originally ordered paddle streamers arrived from A & J Inglis – Pekin, Shanghai, and Ichang. James Henry Scott joined as a partner in 1874, and together with JS&S, they acquired two steamers, named Fuchow and Swatow, from John Scott IV, who also invested in these vessels. The two vessels laid the foundation for the formation of a new company, the Coast Boats Ownery (CBO), which was set up to manage China coastal trade.

By the mid-1870s, CNCo expanded its operations to the Canton River trade and the Shanghai-Ningbo and Shanghai-Tianjin routes. The company faced intense competition, rate wars, and entered into pool agreements with rival firms, reflecting the volatile nature of the Chinese shipping industry in the late 19th century.

By 1883, the five steamships managed by CNCo's managing firm, Butterfield & Swire, and which were primarily serving South China routes, were also integrated into CNCo's own fleet. In the same year, CBO merged with CNCo, and operated as the Coastal Steamers section of CNCo with an expanded fleet.

CNCo's fleet grew to 29 ships by 1894, serving an extensive network of ports across Asia and other regions. The company faced numerous challenges in the 20th century, including political turbulence and piracy in the Far East, but continued operations through both World Wars. Initially focusing on the Yangtze River trade, the company expanded its operations to include coastal and regional routes by the late 19th century.

In 1939, CNCo first became involved in the Papua New Guinea trade, which ceased with the start of the war.

In 1940, the CNCo fleet was requisitioned by the British Government during the World War II, while CNCo maintained its operations from an office in Bombay. In 1945, it returned to Shanghai and Hong Kong, and operations gradually resumed. CNCo's business on the North China Coast (from Ningpo north) and the Yangtze River was undertaken from Shanghai, while the South Coast, Canton trade and all Australian, South East Asian, and Philippines routes were handled out of Hong Kong. The growth of CNCo eventually led to shipping becoming the predominant focus for Butterfield & Swire.

=== 1945–present: Post World War II ===
CNCo re-entered the trade in the 1950s and began new trading routes in the region, from Australia to Papua New Guinea and the Pacific Islands.

Post-World War II, the company innovated in the Pacific trade routes, notably introducing "unitisation" in cargo handling during the 1960s, and later transitioning to full containerisation. The company also diversified into passenger cruising and the dry bulk carrier market, and in the 1980s, ventured into the Very Large Crude Carrier market. The 1990s saw a consolidation of management operations in Sydney, while its New Zealand operations were hinged on its investments in Tasman Asia and Tasman Orient Line.

In 2009, CNCo relocated its headquarters to Singapore, establishing The China Navigation Company Pte Limited as a subsidiary of the UK-registered parent company. Its global liner operations, and all existing ship-owning and operating activities, are being managed out of the new office in Singapore. The office opening ceremony in 2010 was attended by Lim Hwee Hua, then Minister in the Prime Minister's Office and Second Minister for Finance and Transport.

In 2012, CNCo established Swire Bulk to manage its dry bulk shipping activities, and in 2021, separated it to focus on liner shipping and fleet management.

In 2014, CNCo acquired New Zealand-based Pacifica Shipping.

In 2020, CNCo launched Swire Projects to provide specialised project cargo shipping services.

In 2021, CNCo rebranded as Swire Shipping. A year later, Swire Shipping acquired US-based Westwood Shipping Lines.

== Current fleet list ==
=== Swire Shipping ===
MIHOS

- Kokopo Chief

PACIFIC CLASS

- Apia Chief
- Kiribati Chief
- Majuro Chief
- Noumea Chief
- Port Vila Chief
- Samoa Chief
- Tonga Chief
- Vanuatu Chief

HERITAGE CLASS

- Coral Chief
- Highland Chief
- New Guinea Chief
- Papuan Chief

PNG CLASS

- Carpenters Vega
- Changsha
- Moresby Chief
- Rabaul Chief

FIJI CLASS

- Honiara Chief
- Lautoka Chief
- Nadi Chief
- Suva Chief

WESTWOOD

- Westwood Columbia
- Westwood Olympia
- Westwood Rainier
- Westwood Victoria

WEIHAI1300

- Takutai Chief

CC9K

- Aotearoa Chief

CV1700

- Moana Chief

=== Swire Bulk ===
- Hanyang
- Hoihow
- Hunan
- Hupeh
- Kaifong
- Kansu
- Kaying
- Kian
- Kiating
- Kinling
- Liangchow
- Luenho
- Pakhoi
- Pekin
- Powan
- Poyang
- Tatung
- Tientsin
- Tunsin

== Notable former vessels ==
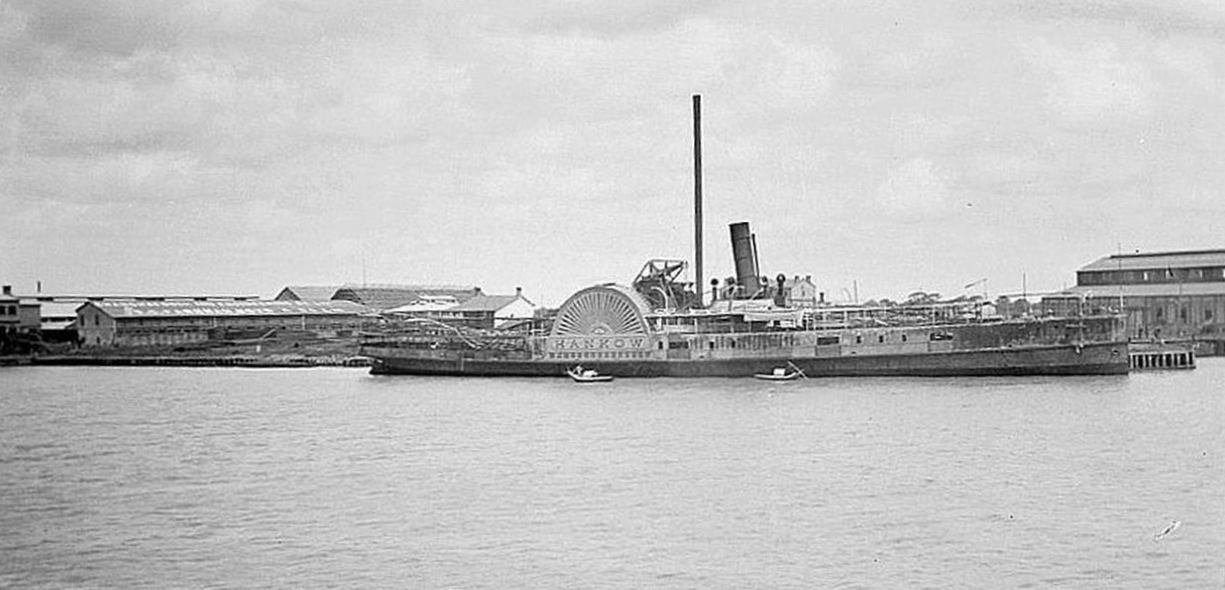
A & J Inglis of Glasgow built the sidewheel river steamship PS Hankow for the China Navigation Co in 1874

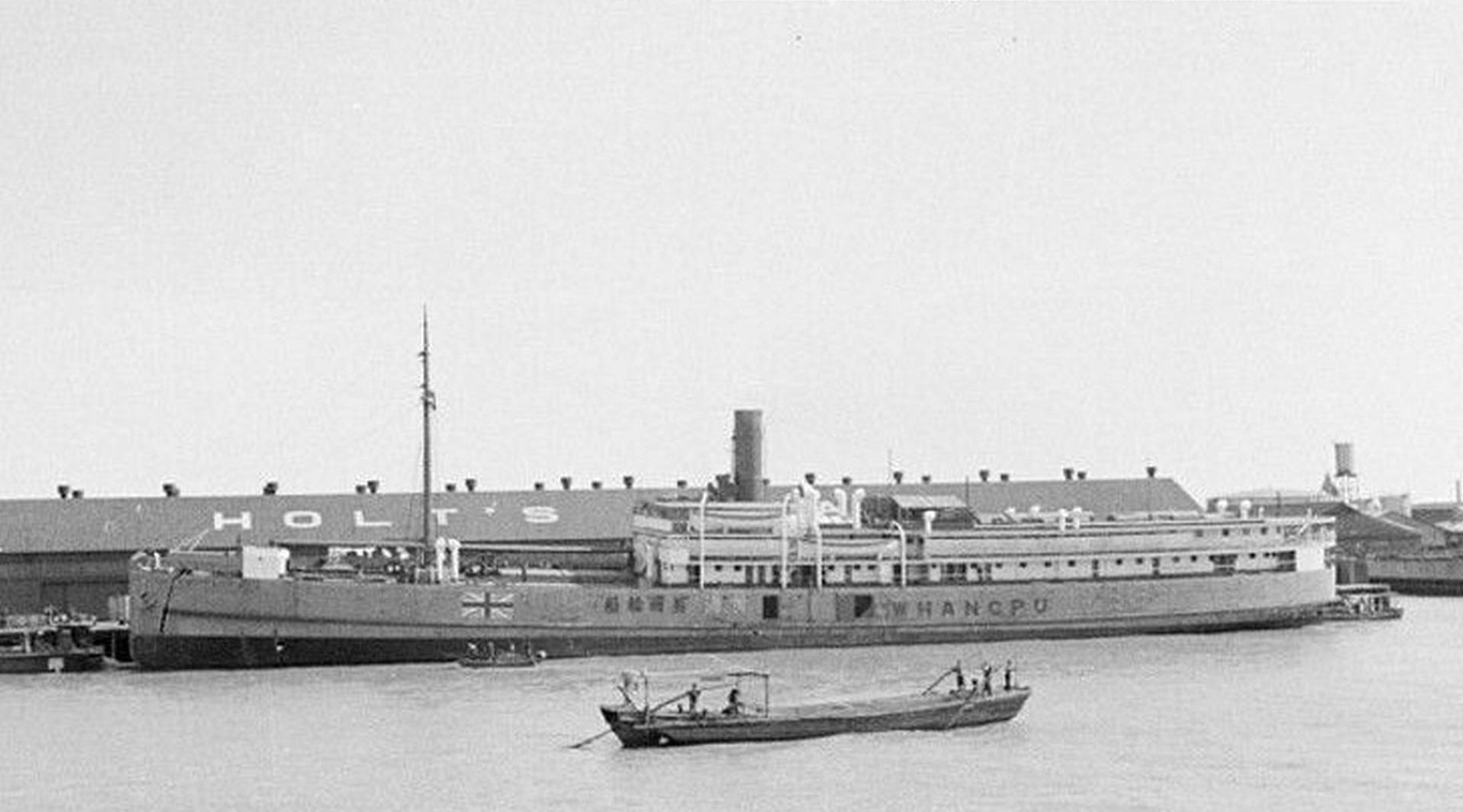
John Swire's subsidiary Taikoo Dockyard in Hong Kong built SS Whang Pu for China Navigation Co in 1920

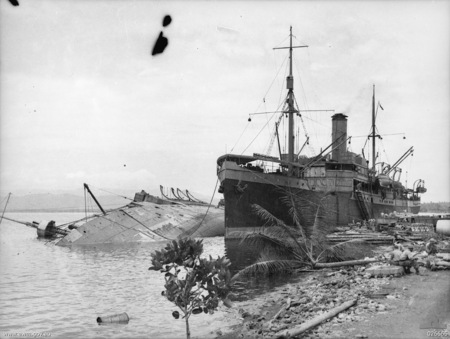
Anshun lying on her side in Milne Bay, New Guinea 1942.

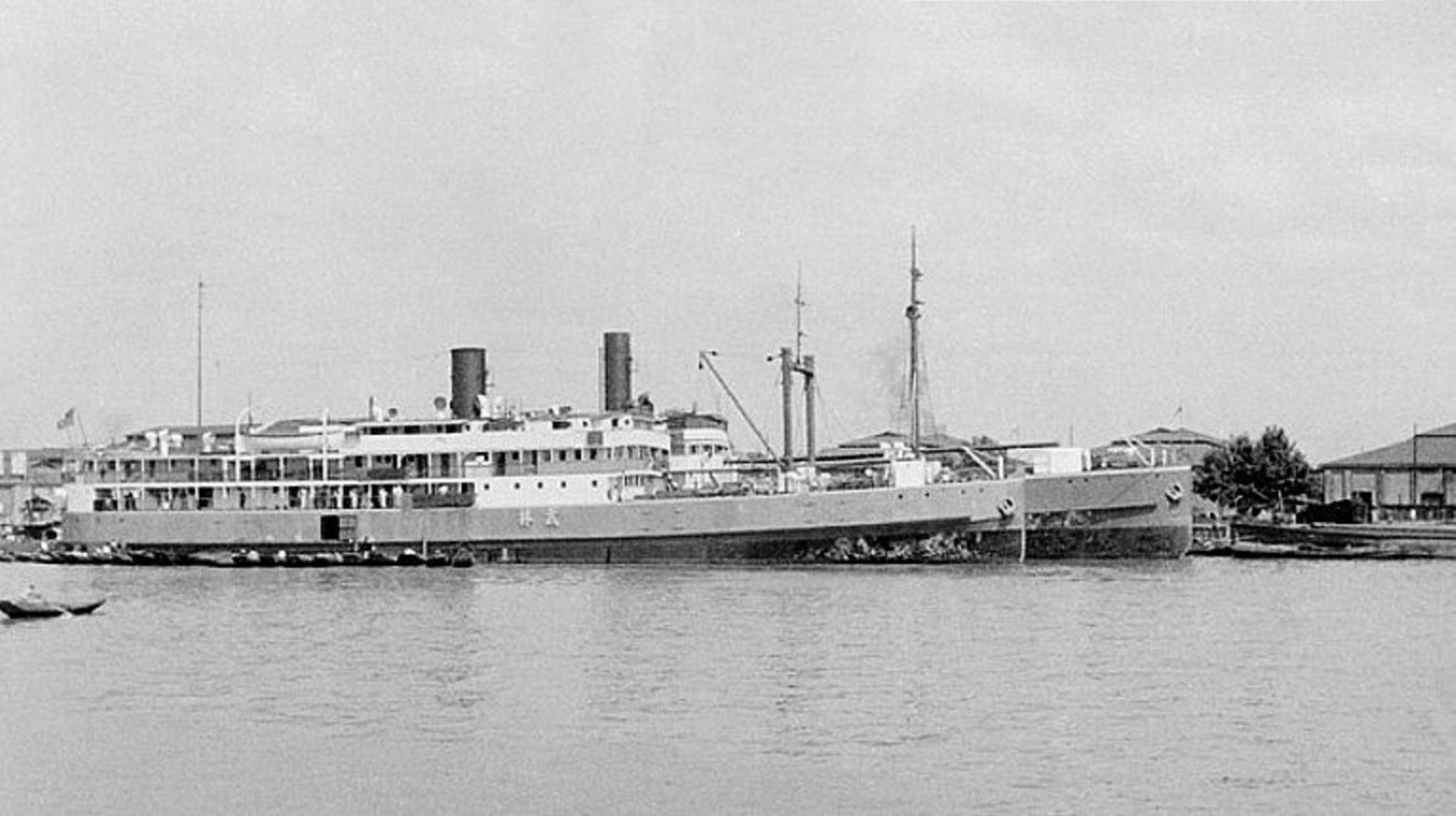
Taikoo Dockyard built the riverboat MV Wulin for the China Navigation Co in 1935

- SS Anhui (3,494 GRT built 1925 was one of only three large vessels, the others being Coast Farmer and Dona Nati, to actually deliver supplies early in the Pacific war to the Philippines from Australia arriving in Cebu City on 20 March 1942. Anhui later operated under U.S. Army control as part of the Southwest Pacific Area permanent local fleet as X-6 from 4 March 1942—September or December 1945.)
- MV Anshun
- MS Changsha
- SS Hanyang (2,876 GRT built 1940 was involved in early Pacific war efforts to supply the Philippines and Netherlands East Indies from Australia and later operated under U.S. Army control as part of the Southwest Pacific Area permanent local fleet as X-8 from 24 March 1942—August 1945.)
- MV Eredine (sold)
- MV Erradale
- SS Shengking
- SS Shuntien (sunk by enemy action)
- MV Soochow (also known as Maersk Asia Decimo)
- MS Taiyuan
- SS Wang Phu
- SS Wu Chang
- MV Wulin
- SS Yochow (2,810 GRT built 1938 was involved in early Pacific war efforts to supply the Philippines and Netherlands East Indies from Australia and later operated under U.S. Army control as part of the Southwest Pacific Area permanent local fleet as X-7 from 11 April 1942—December 1945.)
