= John McBeth =

New Zealand journalist and writer (1944–2023)

John McBeth (31 May 1944 – 7 December 2023) was a New Zealand author and journalist, with the majority of his career spent in Southeast Asia.

== Early life and career ==
McBeth was born on 31 May 1944, in Whanganui, New Zealand, and was the son of Sandy McBeth, a Taranaki dairy farmer, and Isla Dickinson. He attended New Plymouth Boys' High School. McBeth commenced work at the Taranaki Herald on 8 February 1962 and moved to the Auckland Star in late 1965.

== Move to Southeast Asia ==
McBeth left New Zealand around 1970 and headed for Fleet Street in London, but never made it there. The cargo vessel that he was aboard ran aground during its night-time entry into Tanjung Priok Harbour in Indonesia so he spent time in Jakarta before travelling to Singapore and on to Bangkok.

== Work at the Bangkok Post and in Thailand ==
McBeth started employment at the Bangkok Post shortly after arriving in Thailand. He covered stories relating to the Khmer Rouge reign of terror in Cambodia and the Indochinese refugee crisis and appeared briefly as an extra in Michael Cimino's film The Deer Hunter (1978). McBeth also worked as a freelance reporter in Thailand for Agence France-Presse, United Press International (UPI), London's Daily Telegraph and spent three years writing for Hong Kong's Asiaweek.

In 1972, during the Vietnam War, McBeth reported that US Airforce B-52 aircraft were being disproportionately brought down in bombing raids because they were flying at low altitudes and on predictable routes in and out of Hanoi.

In December 1972, four Black September Arab guerrillas took over the Israeli Embassy in Bangkok. Six Israeli hostages were taken but released after a 19-hour drama that ended when Supreme Command Chief of Staff Air Chief Marshall Dawee Chullasapya and Deputy Foreign Minister Chatichai Choonhavan took the places of the hostages. They flew with the terrorists to Egypt. During the siege, McBeth spoke to one of the hostage takers on the telephone. In hindsight, he was of the view that the conversation revealed what was finally to break the siege: the terrorists expressed remorse that, unknown to them, they had made their move on the auspicious day marking the investiture of Crown Prince Vajiralongkorn, King Bhumibol Adulyadej's son.

McBeth attended and reported on the trials that took place from 1973 to 1975 of the suspect accused of planting a bomb on board Cathay Pacific Flight 700Z which crashed near Pleiku in the Central Highlands of Vietnam on 15 June 1972. All 81 passengers and crew were killed. The aircraft had been bound for Hong Kong from Bangkok.

From 1975 to 1976, McBeth investigated and wrote about the wave of refugees that washed across Southeast Asia at the end of the Vietnam War, the Thai fishermen/pirates who raped and murdered Vietnamese boat people, and the Thai soldiers who forced Cambodian refugees back into a Khmer Rouge minefield instead of allowing them to enter Thailand. He was one of the few journalists who detected early on the horrifying extent of the Khmer Rouge Killing Fields purges, though this was initially met with incredulity by other correspondents.

== Career at the Far Eastern Economic Review ==
In May 1979, McBeth joined the staff of the Far Eastern Economic Review, where he would remain for the next 25 years, becoming their longest serving correspondent. During his time in Thailand, including when he was at the Review, he saw and reported on five coups, one of which was aborted but led to the death of his close friend, the Australian cameraman, Neil Davis, in September 1985.

McBeth then went to head the Review's South Korean bureau. In his three years in Seoul, he focused on the country's transformation from an authoritarian to a fledgling democratic state. He reported on the arrest and trial of the North Korean spy Kim Hyon-hui, who helped bring down Korean Air Flight 858 over the Gulf of Martaban in November 1987, later became a Christian, and married her South Korean bodyguard; and the spectacular 1988 Seoul Olympics.

McBeth, together with Nayan Chanda and Shada Islam, revealed in the Review North Korea's efforts to develop a nuclear weapon. American and South Korean officials feared that North Korea was building a reprocessing plant next to a 30 mW nuclear reactor north of Pyongyang. McBeth and his colleagues broke the story in the Review after it was leaked by the Australian Ambassador to South Korea, Richard Broinowski, who had seen American satellite photographs of the Yongbyon site.

McBeth also worked in the Review's offices in Manila in the Philippines, and in Jakarta, Indonesia, where, among other things, he wrote about feuding Filipino warlords and the fall of President Suharto. In Manila, in 1989, he wrote a series of articles in the Review analysing the reasons for the Philippines' continuing economic malaise at a time when other countries in the region were beginning to prosper. In the 1990s, McBeth became the Review's bureau chief in Jakarta. He chronicled growing tensions between President Suharto and some of Indonesia's top politicians and increasing social disturbances, including anti-Chinese riots and troubles in West Kalimantan, which preceded Suharto's resignation and the succession of B. J. Habibie in 1998. In a series of articles in the Review in 2002, McBeth analysed the investigation into the Bali bombings which killed 202 people.

== Books ==
McBeth's 2011 book, Reporter: Forty Years Covering Asia, describes many of his stories. An updated edition, entitled Reporter: Fifty Years Covering Asia, was published in 2022. His 2016 book, The Loner: President Yudhoyono's Decade of Trial and Indecision, provides a review of the decade that Indonesian President Susilo Bambang Yudhoyono spent in power.

== Later work ==
McBeth wrote for Singapore's The Straits Times from the end of 2004 until early 2015, specialising in Indonesian affairs. His work also appeared in The National (Abu Dhabi), the Nikkei Asian Review, the South China Morning Post and the Australian Strategic Policy Institute's official blog The Strategist. McBeth wrote for the Asia Times until shortly before his death.

== Personal life and death ==
A heavy smoker in his younger years, McBeth developed thromboangiitis obliterans, or Buerger's disease, which is a rare inflammatory vascular disease arising mainly in people who smoke. The disease affected his femoral artery constricting the flow of blood to his leg. After a series of unsuccessful angioplasty procedures, McBeth's right leg was amputated in 1992.

McBeth lived in Bali and Jakarta with his wife, an Indonesian journalist named Yuli Ismartono. Yuli Ismartono is the mother of CNN correspondent Atika Shubert.

McBeth died on 7 December 2023, at the age of 79, after what his friends described as "a short illness".

== Sources ==
- Broinowski, Richard (July–August 2011). "Old-school Scribe". Australian Book Review (333).
- Chanda, Nayan; Islam, Shada; McBeth, John (2 February 1989). "Nuclear jitters. Pyongyang could be trying to build the bomb". Far Eastern Economic Review. 143 (5).
- Hume, Tim (20 March 2011). "The lost world of a wild tribe". The Sunday Star-Times.
- Hunt, Luke (27 March 2011). "On speaking-up, Mcbeth and the old guard". Bangkok Post.
- Long, Richard (7 May 2011). "Story behind the news from Asia". The Dominion Post (Wellington).
- Lutfia, Ismira (9 March 2011). "Recounting a life reporting on Asia". Jakarta Globe.
- McBeth, John (24 October 2002). "Weak Link in the Anti-Terror Chain". Far Eastern Economic Review. 165 (42): 14–16.
- McBeth, John (2011). Reporter: Forty Years Covering Asia. Singapore: Talisman Publishing. ISBN 9789810873646.
- O'Hare, Noel (28 October – 3 November 1995). "At home in Asia's hotspots". Listener.
- Rulistia, Novia D. (2 September 2015). "Atika Shubert: CNN's storyteller". Jakarta Globe.
- Sarahtika, Dhania Putri (23 February 2017). "Veteran Journalist Exposes SBY's Failings in New Book". Jakarta Globe.
