= Shada Islam =

European commentator and journalist

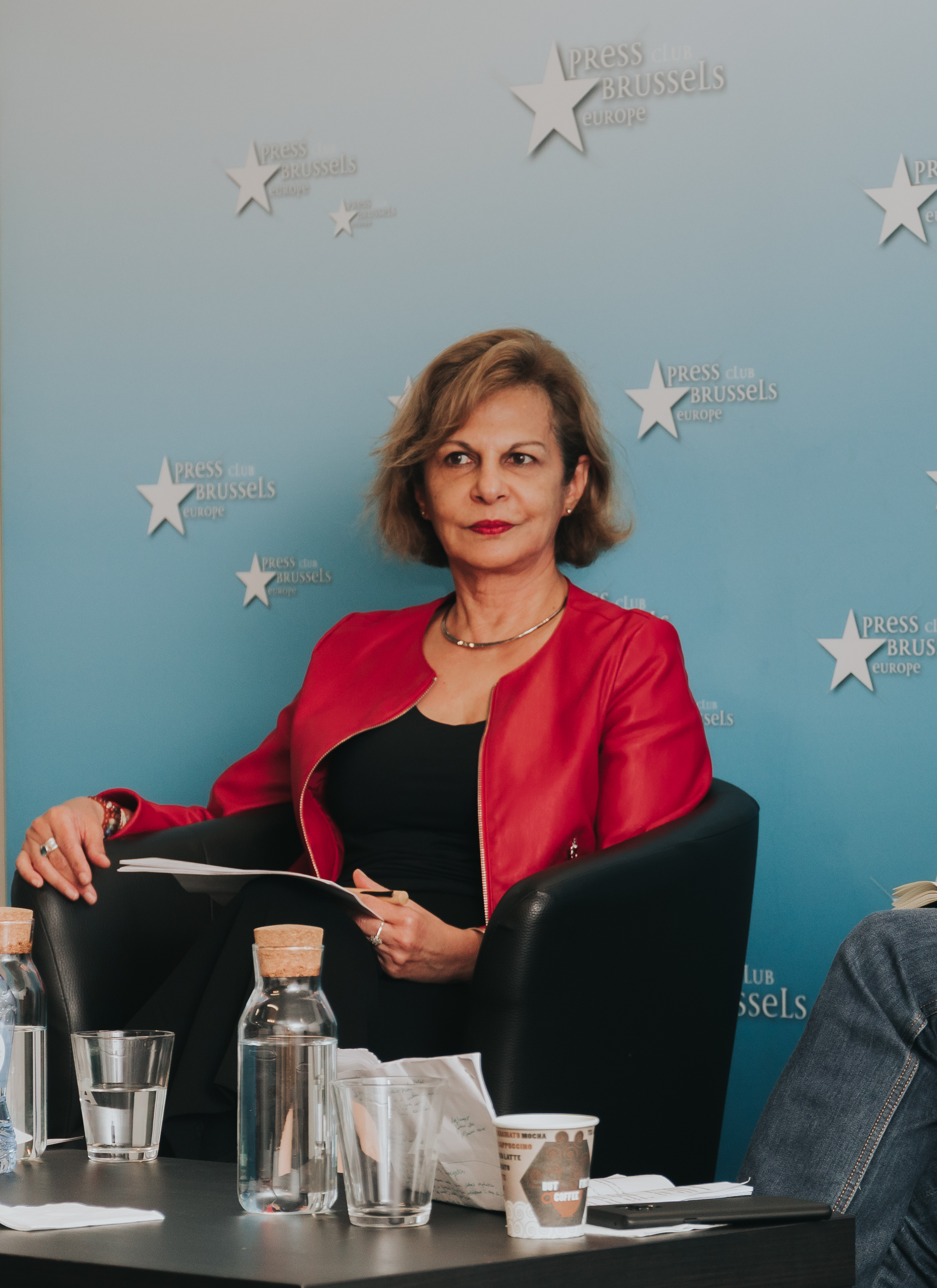
- Shada Islam, EU commentator
- Born: Lahore, Pakistan
- Education: Université libre de Bruxelles
- Occupations: political commentator and journalist
- Website: www.shadaislam.com

Shada Islam is a Brussels-based commentator on Asia and on EU affairs. She is a Belgian citizen.

In 2017, Politico listed Islam among 20 women who are driving Europe's major political debates. Politico designated Islam as "the ultimate insider outsider."

== Early life ==
Islam was born in Lahore in Pakistan. She moved to Brussels as a student. Islam graduated in journalism and social communication from the Université libre de Bruxelles.

== Career ==
=== Journalism ===
After graduating Islam joined the Far Eastern Economic Review, where she was a Europe correspondent for more than 20 years. In February 2022, Islam took the position of editor of the EUobserver magazine publication.

=== Research and academia ===
In 2007, Islam joined the European Policy Centre think tank in Brussels. where she worked on migration and Asia.

Islam is a visiting professor at the Natolin campus of the College of Europe. She is also a fellow at the Vrije Universiteit Brussel.

Islam took the job of Director of Europe and Geopolitics at the think tank Friends of Europe, where she stayed for nine years. After leaving Friends of Europe, Islam started her own consultancy called New Horizons Project.

Islam called out the complacency of the European Union with Viktor Orbán’s undemocratic tendencies, which undermines the credibility of Europe on the international stage.

== Brussels So White commentator ==
Islam repeatedly expressed concerned about the lack of ethnic diversity in the EU policy making circles. Together with James Kanter, Islam launched a series dedicated to the issue of Brussels So White on the EU Scream podcast in 2022. She also raised the alarm about the far-right influence on the European institutions, when in comes to the treatment of Muslims and minorities.

== Awards ==
Islam received the Women of Europe Awards 2023 by European Movement International in the category Woman in Media.

Islam received the 2023 Ernest Udina Award for a European Trajectory from the European Journalist Association in Catalonia.
