= Brussels So White =

Movement for racial diversity in European Union institutions

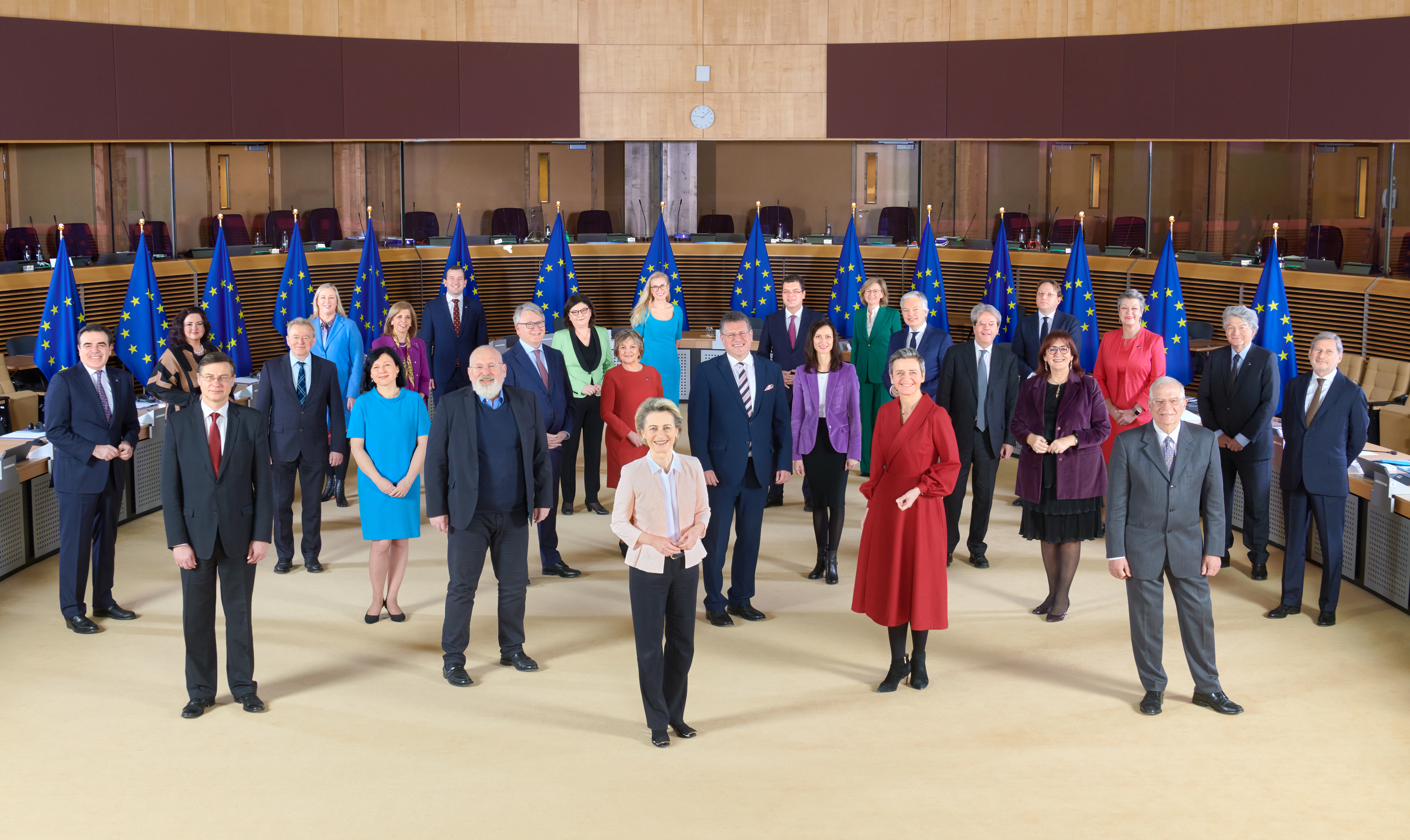
- European Commissioners 2021
- Date: 2017–present
- Location: European Union, Brussels
- Cause: Alleged racial discrimination and lack of ethnic diversity in the European Union institutions

The Brussels So White (or #BrusselsSoWhite) movement is an informal movement denouncing the perceived lack of racial diversity in the European Union institutions in Brussels.

== Origin of the term ==
The hashtag BrusselsSoWhite first appeared in an article by Politico in 2017 written by Ryan Heath. The article featured a collage of the portraits of all of the 751 Members of the European Parliament accompanied by the hashtag BrusselsSoWhite.

In May 2022, the podcast EU Scream launched a new series dedicated to the issue of BrusselsSoWhite. The first episode of the series dealt with the question of white feminism in an interview with author Rafia Zakaria.

== Underrepresentation of people of colour among EU decision makers ==
The use of the hashtag on Twitter has emphases the lack of racial diversity in the European Parliament. Ethnic minorities account for more than 10% of the population of the EU, however less than 5% of the lawmakers elected to the European Parliament are people of color, a proportion further reduced to 4% after Brexit. The lack of racial diversity among employees of the institutions of the European Union in Brussels, referred to under the hashtag BrusselsSoWhite, is even more striking because Brussels is a relatively racial diverse city.

The European Commission refused in the past to collect information on the ethnic diversity of its employees.

== Discrimination and racism ==
The hashtag BrusselsSoWhite has been invoked to denounce manifestations of racism towards people of colour working in European affairs in Brussels. Employees of color at the European institutions are frequently assumed to be cleaning personnel, catering personnel or intruders.

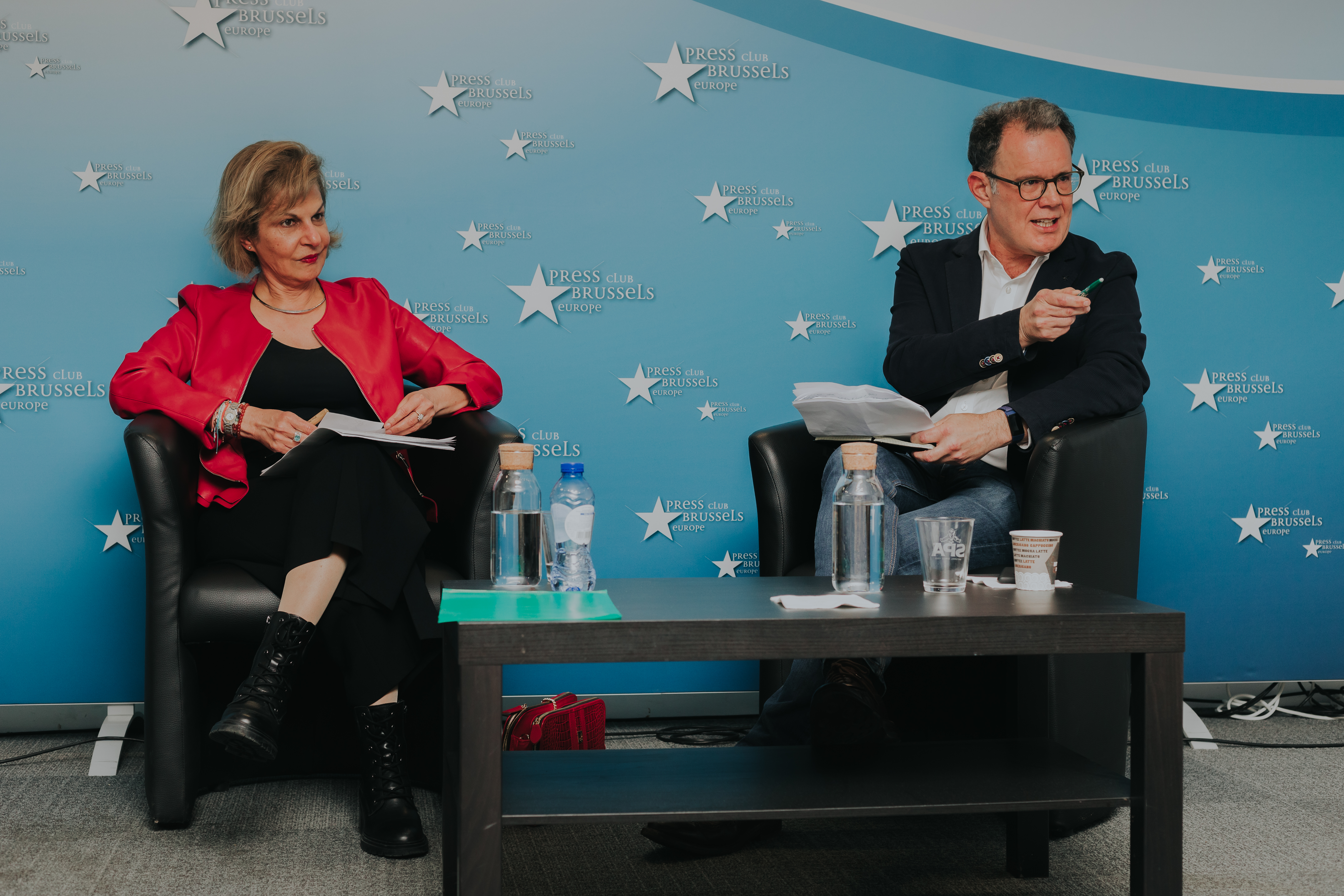
Shada Islam and James Kanter presenting the #BrusselsSoWhite initiative at the Press Club Brussels Europe on 15 October 2022

Shada Islam argued that because of the lack of diversity as denounced by #BrusselsSoWhite, whiteness could be perceived as being central to the European identity. In this manner the lack of racial diversity could fuel the arguments of the far-right movements in Europe.

== Reactions ==
In September 2020, the European Commission put forward an Anti-Racism Action Plan to tackle the structural racism in the EU, including measures to address the lack of diversity of the European decision makers in Brussels, as denounced by #BrusselsSoWhite. The plan and any accompanying announcement by the European institutions have yet to be translated in progress in terms of diversity in the European institutions. Commentators expressed regrets about the absence of response or action from Brussels-based think-tanks and environmental NGOs in reaction to the stated objective of the European Commission to combat racism.
