= Phú Bổn province =

Phú Bổn was a province of the Republic of Vietnam.

== History ==
Its name Phú-bổn in Kinh language was originated from Krông-bông in Bahnar language, which is the largest river flowing through the area of the province.

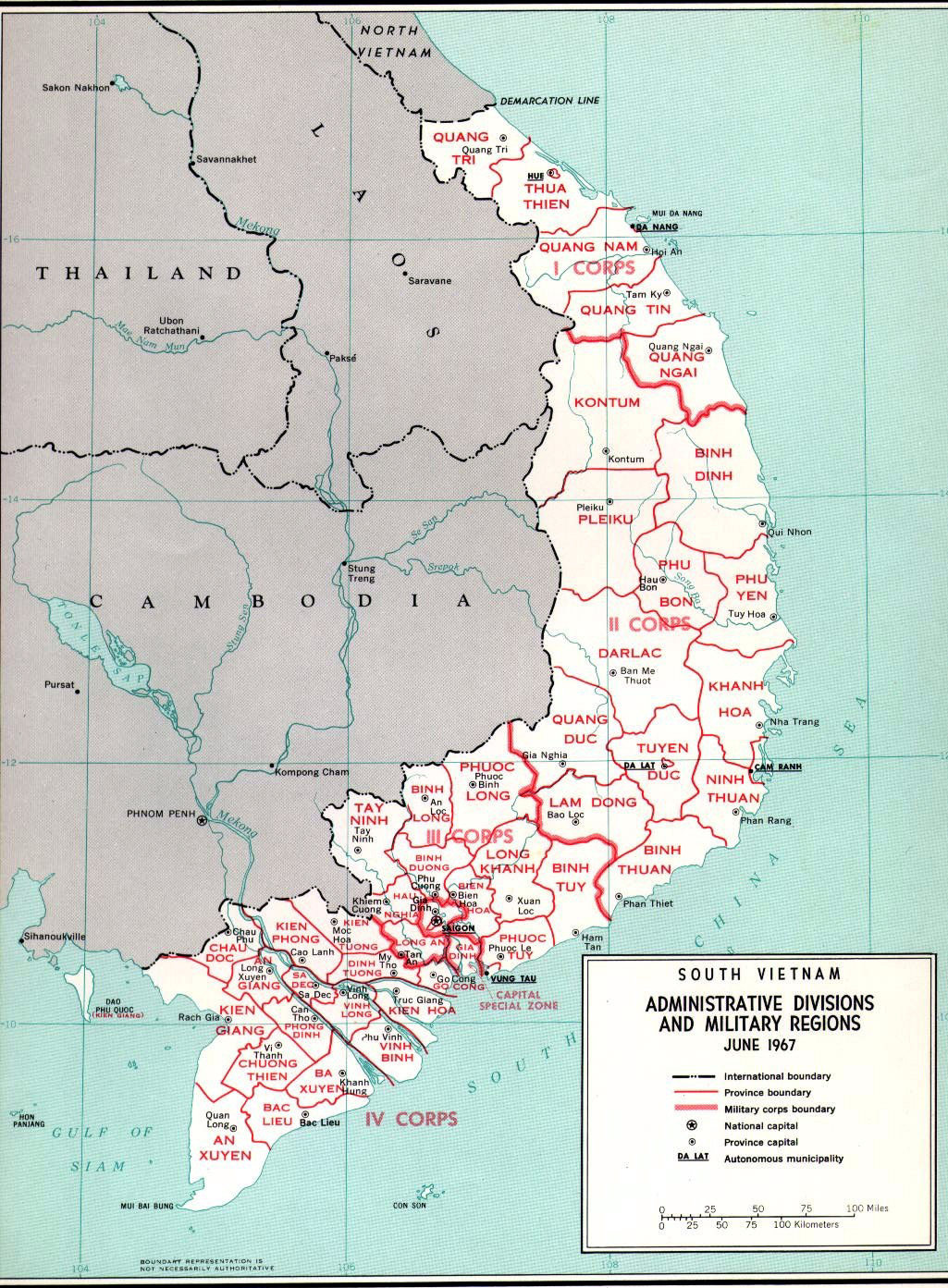
As in the map from 1967.

In September 1962, the government of the Republic of Vietnam divided Pleiku province into two provinces: Pleiku and Phu Bon. In 1976, the province was imported into Dak Lak province, then most of the area was imported to Gia Lai province and Kon Tum province. The province was a location in the Central Highlands Campaign

The 1972 crash of Cathay Pacific Flight 700Z took place in this province.

== See also ==
- Darlac
- Phú Yên
