= Thromboangiitis obliterans =

Recurrent inflammation and clotting of blood vessels in the hands and feet

- Other names: Buerger disease, Buerger's disease, Winiwarter-Buerger disease, presenile gangrene
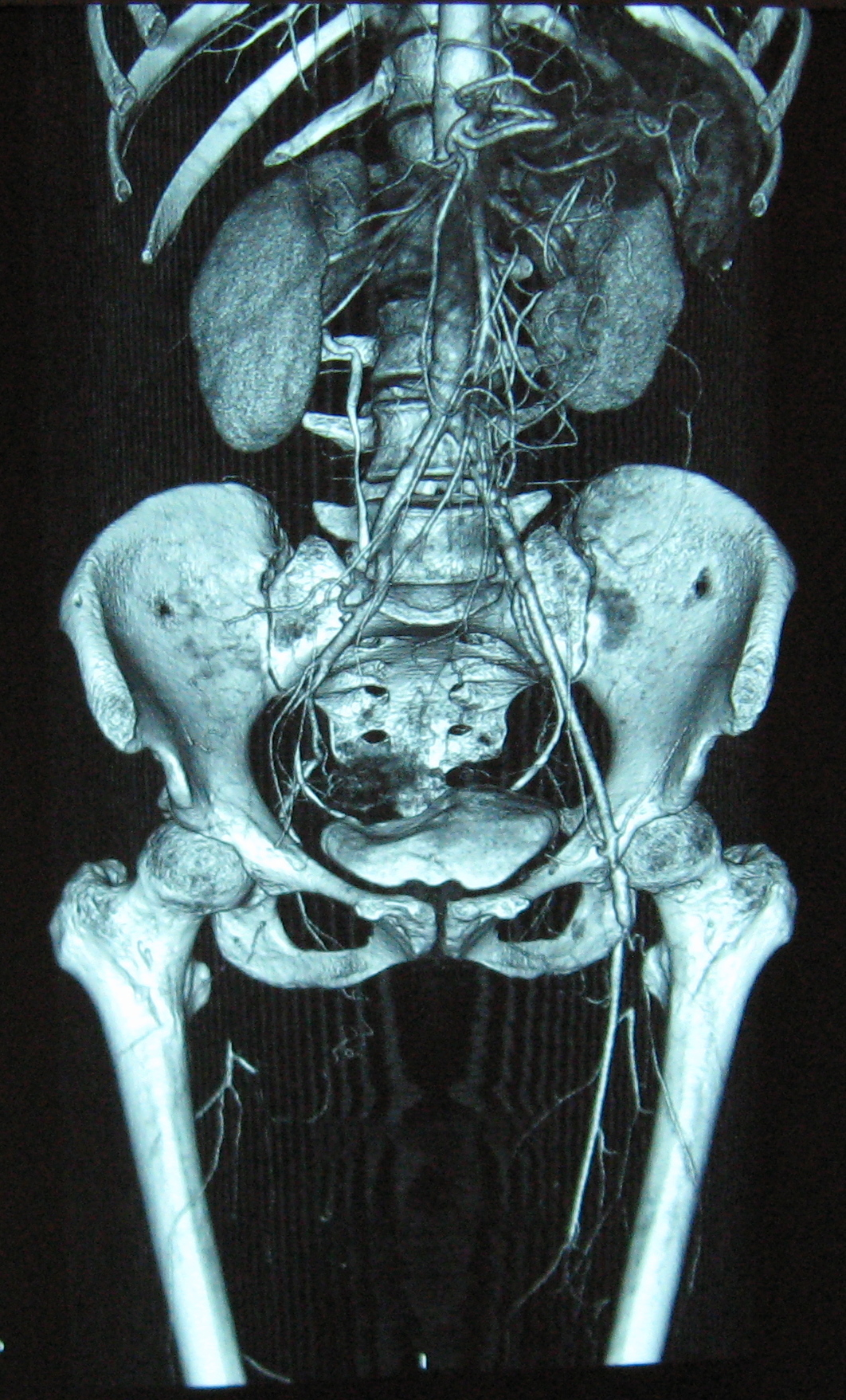
- Complete occlusion of the right and stenosis of the left femoral artery as seen in a case of thromboangiitis obliterans
- Specialty: Cardiology, rheumatology

Thromboangiitis obliterans, also known as Buerger disease (English /ˈbɜːrɡər/; German: [ˈbʏʁɡɐ]) or Winiwarter-Buerger disease, is a recurring progressive inflammation and thrombosis (clotting) of small and medium arteries and veins of the hands and feet. It is strongly associated with use of tobacco products, primarily from smoking, but is also associated with smokeless tobacco.

== Signs and symptoms ==
There is a recurrent acute and chronic inflammation and thrombosis of arteries and veins of the hands and feet. The main symptom is pain in the affected areas, at rest and while walking (claudication). The impaired circulation increases sensitivity to cold. Peripheral pulses are diminished or absent. There are color changes in the extremities. The colour may range from cyanotic blue to reddish blue. Skin becomes thin and shiny. Hair growth is reduced. Ulcerations and gangrene in the extremities are common complications, often resulting in the need for amputation of the involved extremity.

== Pathophysiology ==
There are characteristic pathologic findings of acute inflammation and thrombosis (clotting) of arteries and veins of the hands and feet (the lower limbs being more common). The mechanisms underlying Buerger's disease are still largely unknown, but smoking and tobacco consumption are major factors associated with it. It has been suggested that the tobacco may trigger an immune response in susceptible persons or it may unmask a clotting defect, either of which could incite an inflammatory reaction of the vessel wall.

A possible role for Rickettsia in this disease has been proposed.

== Diagnosis ==
A concrete diagnosis of thromboangiitis obliterans is often difficult as it relies heavily on exclusion of other conditions. The commonly followed diagnostic criteria are outlined below although the criteria tend to differ slightly from author to author. Olin (2000) proposes the following criteria:

1. Typically between 20 and 40 years old and male, although recently females have been diagnosed.
2. Current (or recent) history of tobacco use.
3. Presence of distal extremity ischemia (indicated by claudication, pain at rest, ischemic ulcers or gangrene) documented by noninvasive vascular testing such as ultrasound.
4. Exclusion of other autoimmune diseases, hypercoagulable states, and diabetes mellitus by laboratory tests.
5. Exclusion of a proximal source of emboli by echocardiography and arteriography.
6. Consistent arteriographic findings in the clinically involved and noninvolved limbs.

Buerger's disease can be mimicked by a wide variety of other diseases that cause diminished blood flow to the extremities. These other disorders must be ruled out with an aggressive evaluation, because their treatments differ substantially from that of Buerger's disease, for which there is no treatment known to be effective.

Some diseases with which Buerger's disease may be confused include atherosclerosis (build-up of cholesterol plaques in the arteries), endocarditis (an infection of the lining of the heart), other types of vasculitis, severe Raynaud's phenomenon associated with connective tissue disorders (e.g., lupus or scleroderma), clotting disorders or the production of clots in the blood.

Angiograms of the upper and lower extremities can be helpful in making the diagnosis of Buerger's disease. In the proper clinical setting, certain angiographic findings are diagnostic of Buerger's. These findings include a "corkscrew" appearance of arteries that result from vascular damage, particularly the arteries in the region of the wrists and ankles. Collateral circulation gives "tree root" or "spider leg" appearance. Angiograms may also show occlusions (blockages) or stenosis (narrowings) in multiple areas of both the arms and legs. Distal plethysmography also yields useful information about circulatory status in digits. To rule out other forms of vasculitis (by excluding involvement of vascular regions atypical for Buerger's), it is sometimes necessary to perform angiograms of other body regions (e.g., a mesenteric angiogram).

Skin biopsies of affected extremities are rarely performed because of the frequent concern that a biopsy site near an area poorly perfused with blood will not heal well.

== Prevention ==
The cause of the disease is thought to be autoimmune in nature and heavily linked to tobacco use in patients with Buerger's as primary disease.

== Treatment ==
Smoking cessation has been shown to slow the progression of the disease and decrease the severity of amputation in most patients, but does not halt the progression.

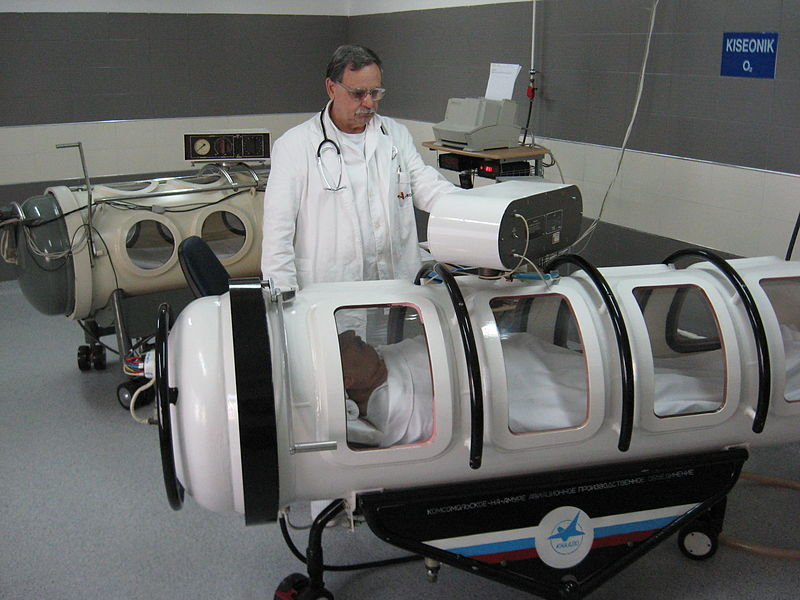
Treatment by 100% hyperbaric oxygen

In acute cases, drugs and procedures which cause vasodilation are effective in reducing pain experienced by patient. For example, prostaglandins like Limaprost are vasodilators and give relief of pain, but do not help in changing the course of disease. Epidural anesthesia and hyperbaric oxygen therapy also have vasodilator effect. There is moderate certainty evidence that intravenous iloprost (prostacyclin analogue) is more effective than aspirin for relieving rest pain and healing ischemic ulcers. No difference have been detected between iloprost or clinprost (prostacyclin) and alprostadil (prostaglandin analogue) for relieving pain and healing ulcers.

In chronic cases, lumbar sympathectomy may be occasionally helpful. It reduces vasoconstriction and increases blood flow to limb. It aids in healing and giving relief from pain of ischemic ulcers. Bypass can sometimes be helpful in treating limbs with poor perfusion secondary to this disease. Use of vascular growth factor and stem cell injections have been showing promise in clinical studies. There may be a benefit of using bone marrow-derived stem cells in healing ulcers and improving pain-free walking distance, but larger, high-quality trials are needed. Debridement is done in necrotic ulcers. In gangrenous digits, amputation is frequently required. Below-knee and above-knee amputation is rarely required.

Streptokinase has been proposed as adjuvant therapy in some cases.

Despite the clear presence of inflammation in this disorder, anti-inflammatory agents such as corticosteroids have not been shown to be beneficial in healing, but do have significant anti-inflammatory and pain relief qualities in low dosage intermittent form. Similarly, strategies of anticoagulation have not proven effective. physical therapy: interferential current therapy to decrease inflammation.

== Prognosis ==
Buerger's is not immediately fatal. Amputation is common and major amputations (of limbs rather than fingers/toes) are almost twice as common in patients who continue to smoke. Prognosis markedly improves if a person quits smoking. Female patients tend to show much higher longevity rates than male patients. The only known way to slow the progression of the disease is to abstain from all tobacco products.

== Epidemiology ==
Buerger's is more common among men than women. Although present worldwide, it is more prevalent in the Middle East and Far East. Incidence of thromboangiitis obliterans is 8 to 12 per 100,000 adults in the United States (0.75% of all patients with peripheral vascular disease).

== History ==
Buerger's disease was first described by Felix von Winiwarter in 1879 in Austria. It was not until 1908, however, that the disease was given its first accurate pathological description, by Leo Buerger at Mount Sinai Hospital in New York City, who referred to the condition as "presenile spontaneous gangrene".

== Notable people affected ==
As reported by Alan Michie in God Save the Queen, published in 1952 (see pages 194 and following), King George VI was diagnosed with the disease on 12 November 1948. Both legs were affected, the right more seriously than the left. The king's doctors prescribed complete rest and electric treatment to stimulate circulation, but as they were either unaware of the connection between the disease and smoking (the king was a heavy smoker) or unable to persuade the king to stop smoking, the disease failed to respond to their treatment. On 12 March 1949, the king underwent a lumbar sympathectomy, performed at Buckingham Palace by James R. Learmonth. The operation, as such, was successful, but the king was warned that it was a palliative, not a cure, and that there could be no assurance that the disease would not grow worse. From all accounts, the king continued to smoke.

The author and journalist John McBeth describes his experiences of the disease, and treatment for it, in the chapter "Year of the Leg" in his book Reporter: Forty Years Covering Asia.

Former Philippine president Rodrigo Duterte disclosed in 2015 that he has Buerger's disease.

M. F. K. Fisher's second husband, Dillwyn Parrish, developed Buerger's disease when they lived in Switzerland in the early 1940s.
