= COPA-COGECA =

European farmers lobby group

- Committee of Professional Agricultural Organisations in the Europe Union
- Abbreviation: COPA-COGECA
- Formation: 1962; 64 years ago
- Founders: COPA and COGECA
- Type: Lobby group
- Legal status: Umbrella organization
- Purpose: Advocating for agricultural framers, trade unions and professional organizations
- Location: Brussels, Belgium
- Region served: European Union
- Services: Lobby on the Common Agricultural Policy for farmers and agricultural owners
- Official language: French and English
- Secretary General: Elli Tsiforou
- Staff: 50 (2025)
- Website: www.copa-cogeca.eu

COPA-COGECA (In French: Comité des organisations professionnelles agricoles-Comité général de la coopération agricole de l'Union européenne, In English: Committee of Professional Agricultural Organisations-General Confederation of Agricultural Cooperatives), is the union of the two big European agricultural umbrella organisations COPA and COGECA and the strongest interest group for European farmers.

Founded in 1962 and headquartered in Brussels, its activity focus is on the Common Agricultural Policy and other policy areas relevant to farmers and agri-cooperatives, such as: food safety, animal health and welfare, plant health, environment, research and innovation, trade etc..

The current President of COPA is Confagricoltura President Massimiliano Giansanti from Italy (since 2024), the current president of COGECA is Lennart Nilsson from Sweden (since 2023). The secretary general of COPA-COGECA is Elli Tsiforou.

COPA-COGECA was a founding member of the EU lobby group European Livestock Voice. In 2023, an investigation by Lighthouse Reports in partnership with The Guardian and EU Scream revealed that the livestock industry lobbied the European Commission into delaying legislative proposals to protect animal welfare in the European Union.

== History ==
On 6 September 1958, the first European representative organisation, COPA, was created. On 24 September 1959, the agricultural cooperatives of the European Community created the European umbrella organisation, COGECA. COPA's Secretariat was established in Brussels on 1 April 1959, merging with that of COGECA on 1 December 1962.

In 2019, COPA-COGECA opposed the European Union–Mercosur Free Trade Agreement with South America. The COPA-COGECA said the impact of the free trade deal would be "devastating on the European farming family model".
