= Phú Túc =

Phú Túc may refer to several places in Vietnam:

- Phú Túc, Gia Lai, a township and capital of Krông Pa District
- Phú Túc, Hanoi, a rural commune of Phú Xuyên District
- Phú Túc, Bến Tre, a rural commune of Châu Thành District
- Phú Túc, Đồng Nai, a rural commune of Định Quán District
