= Cathay Pacific Flight 700Z =

1972 airliner bombing

Coordinates: 13°59′N 108°00′E

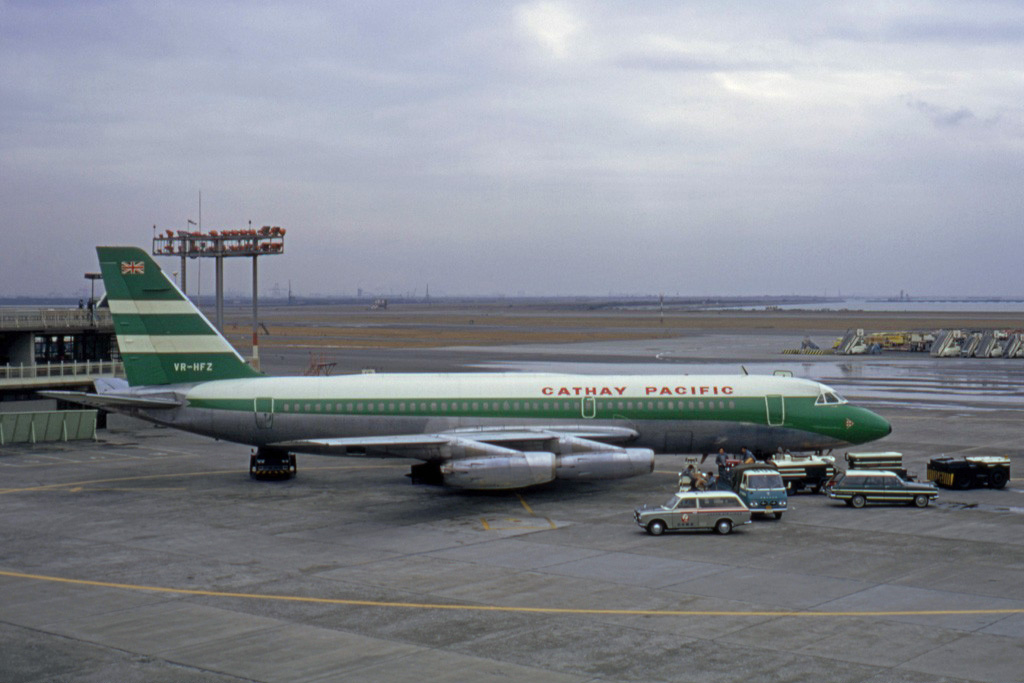
- VR-HFZ, the aircraft involved in the bombing, in February 1972

Bombing
- Date: 15 June 1972
- Summary: Bombing
- Site: 30 miles (48 km) southeast of Pleiku, Phú Bổn province, South Vietnam (now Vietnam)

Aircraft
- Aircraft type: Convair CV-880-22M-21
- Operator: Cathay Pacific
- IATA flight No.: CX700Z
- ICAO flight No.: CPA700Z
- Call sign: CATHAY 700 ZULU
- Registration: VR-HFZ
- Flight origin: Singapore International Airport, Singapore
- Stopover: Bangkok International Airport (now Don Mueang International Airport), Bangkok, Thailand
- Destination: Hong Kong International Airport (a.k.a. Kai Tak Airport), British Hong Kong
- Passengers: 71
- Crew: 10
- Fatalities: 81
- Survivors: 0

Cathay Pacific Flight 700Z was a flight from Singapore to Hong Kong operated by Cathay Pacific using a Convair CV-880 aircraft that crashed 30 miles (48 km) southeast of Pleiku, then in South Vietnam, on the afternoon of 15 June 1972, killing all 81 passengers and crew on board.

It remains the deadliest aviation incident involving a Convair CV-880. An investigation was carried out by officials from Great Britain and Cathay Pacific, but efforts to retrieve wreckage and study the crash site were hampered by ongoing fighting in the region due to the Vietnam War.

An inquiry later determined the crash to have been caused by an explosive device, likely located within the passenger cabin. A Thai national was arrested as a suspect in the bombing but later acquitted at trial. Journalist John McBeth, who had worked for the Bangkok Post, described said trial as "Thailand's version of the O.J. Simpson trial."

It was the deadliest incident to occur on a Cathay Pacific aircraft, and at the time it occurred, it was the deadliest civilian aviation accident in South Vietnam.

== Aircraft and crew ==
Flight 700Z was flown using a Convair CV-880 which had been manufactured in 1961 and bore the registration VR-HFZ. The Captain of the flight was 43-year-old Australian national Henry Neil Morison (who had a total of 14,343 flight hours, including 5,261 hours logged on the CV-880), 38-year-old First Officer Lachlan Campbell Arbuthnot Mackenzie (7,649 flight hours, with 2,867 hours on the CV-880), 42-year-old second First Officer Leslie Albert Boyer (5,783 flight hours, with 1,529 hours on the CV-880), and 36-year-old Flight Engineer James Kenneth "Ken" Hickey (4,246 flight hours, with 2,595 on the CV-880). There were six cabin crew from Hong Kong led by two pursers, William Yuen Hok-man (Note: William Yuen Hok-man: Chinese: 袁學文; Jyutping: jyun4 hok6 man4) and Dicky Kong Kar-wah (Note: Dicky Kong Kar-wah: Chinese: 鄺嘉華; Jyutping: kwong3 gaa1 waa4).

Morison and Hickey were Australian, and based in Hong Kong, whilst Mackenzie and Boyer were British. Morison previously was in the Hong Kong Auxiliary Air Force, where he befriended Adrian Swire. Hickey had previously survived Cathay Pacific Airways Flight 033, an accident where a Convair 880 fell into Kowloon Bay.

Of the pursers, one was of British nationality and the other was of a Chinese nationality. Of the four regular flight attendants, two were of a Chinese nationality, one was of Singaporean nationality, and one was of British nationality. Gavin Young, author of Beyond Lion Rock: The Story of Cathay Pacific Airways, identified all of the cabin crew as "Hong Kong Chinese".

== Passengers ==
Nationality	Passengers	Crew	Total
Japan	17	0	17
United States	17	0	17
Thailand	10	0	10
Philippines	7	0	7
British Hong Kong	6	0	6
Singapore	3	1	4
Taiwan+"Chinese"("華籍")	2	3	5
United Kingdom	2	4	6
Malaysia	1	0	1
France	1	0	1
Ireland	1	0	1
Bangladesh	1	0	1
Unknown	3	0	3
Total	71	10	81

36 of the passengers boarded in Bangkok. The remainder of the passengers on the sector that was bombed had boarded in Singapore.

The nationalities with the largest numbers of passengers were Japan, Thailand, and the United States.

A June 1972 article in The Age stated that there were 17 passengers from Japan, 16 from the United States, 10 from Thailand, six from Hong Kong, three from Singapore, two each from Taiwan and the United Kingdom, and one each from Bangladesh, France, and Ireland.

The Japanese passengers included 12 members of a tour group from Gunma Prefecture. About 150 relatives and friends, including coworkers and acquaintances, of the Japanese deceased traveled to Saigon and met with Cathay Pacific employees. Young stated that members of the Japanese groups in Saigon were "particularly vociferous", "agitated", and had given "impossible demands" to Cathay Pacific employees.

According to a June 1972 report from the Associated Press, 11 Americans boarded the flight in Singapore and were bound for Hong Kong. Additionally, the report stated, six Americans boarded in Bangkok. Therefore, that count stated there were a total of 17 Americans on the sector when the flight was bombed. The CEO and chairperson of the board of B.C. Ziegler, his wife, four of their children, and a family friend, all from West Bend, Wisconsin, United States, were among the deceased who boarded in Singapore. Among those who boarded in Bangkok were a member of the board of trustees of Indiana University and his wife.

There were seven members of one Filipino family on board.

Three Hong Kong residents boarded in Singapore.

Two passengers from the United Kingdom and one from Ireland who were bound for Hong Kong boarded in Singapore. The Irish passenger, a priest, trained Cathay Pacific flight attendants in their speech.

An article in the The Sydney Morning Herald stated that, whilst there were Australian crew members, no Australian passengers were recorded. Some other articles stated that one passenger was Australian.

== Incident ==
=== Initial disappearance ===
Flight 700Z originated from Singapore with a scheduled stopover at Bangkok's Don Mueang International Airport, with the final destination being Hong Kong's Kai Tak Airport. The first leg of the flight proceeded without incident before the aircraft took off from Bangkok at midday with 71 passengers and ten crew members on board. The crew made regular radio contact for the initial leg of the flight.

At 05:42 GMT (12:42 local time), the flight made contact with Saigon ATC. At 05:44, the crew made a routine transmission updating the progress of their route, adding that they would expect to reach their next waypoint by 06:06 GMT. This was the last transmission received from the flight. After Saigon lost contact with the aircraft, they made an appeal for information to both Hong Kong and Taipei ATC which produced negative results. Saigon then initiated an investigation as to the aircraft's whereabouts. Initial reports speculated that the flight may have collided with an American military plane with Reuters and Agence France-Presse claiming Flight 700Z to have been involved in a mid-air collision. However, no reports emerged of any other aircraft missing in the area.

The wreckage was near the town of Cheo Reo (now called Ayun Pa). The crash location was about 30 miles (48 km) southeast of Pleiku, and about 200 miles (320 km) north of Saigon. It was located in what was Phú Bổn province. As of 2026 that area is in Gia Lai province in the Socialist Republic of Viet Nam (SRV).

Staff from the embassies of Japan, the Philippines, Taiwan, and the United States went to the wreckage location to help the identification process for the deceased.

== Investigation ==
The wreckage was located by a United States Army helicopter in "lightly wooded" terrain on a remote hilltop near Pleiku, still burning, not long after Saigon ATC lost contact. Although two bodies were retrieved almost immediately, the presence of hostile Vietcong forces nearby made it very difficult to examine the wreckage in depth. South Vietnamese soldiers were drafted in to search for the wreckage and secure the crash site. It was reported that before the area was secured, local villagers and Viet Cong had gone through the wreckage looking for valuables. The South Vietnamese Civil Aviation Department, the Thai government, and Cathay Pacific Airways each had their own investigations. Two British men, Vernon Clancy and Eric Newton, went to the location to get information about the crash. Newton was the primary person investigating aviation accidents at the Civil Aviation Authority, while Clancy used to be a part of the Royal Armament Research and Development Establishment.

The spread of debris suggested that the airplane had broken into three large sections, with the breakpoints almost exactly along the front and rear of the wingbox, prior to hitting the ground, and the relative closeness of these sections suggested that this breakup had occurred at a low altitude. Other debris, including two engines and the horizontal stabilizer, could be seen further away from helicopters, but could not be reached on foot due to war activity. The rear section of the aircraft was later found impaled on a tree with the bodies of thirteen passengers and two cabin crew members still inside while the middle section was found to have exploded on impact with the ground. The aircraft's flight data recorder was recovered and read; it showed that the airplane was flying on course at 29,000 feet (8,800 m) at a speed of 310 knots (570 km/h) until 05:59 GMT (12:59 local time), at which point the recorded data became nonsensical for 30 seconds before stopping entirely. The aircraft was not equipped with a cockpit voice recorder. The detonation occurred after 64 minutes and 2 seconds in the air.

Upon examining the available debris, it soon became clear that the aircraft had suffered some sort of structural problem and loss of control at cruising altitude, and that the low-altitude breakup was caused by the overstressing of the airplane during an uncontrolled descent. Debris from the centre fuselage and right wing root showed signs of explosive "splash", and the number 3 fuel tank showed signs that it had ruptured prior to the low-altitude breakup inferred from the wreckage distribution. The vertical stabilizer showed signs that it had been struck by "at least one body and possibly some seats", and the horizontal stabilizer also showed signs of being damaged by debris in the air. Many bodies were not recovered, possibly because they had been ejected very early in this sequence. An investigator working at the crash site summarised that the plane suffered an explosive decompression around 1pm local time. According to Young, the cabin crew were found wearing serving jackets and aprons, and so "One can assume" that the crew were serving lunch at the time of the in-flight breakup. The passengers standing in the aisle or queuing for the lavatory and cabin crew members overseeing the meal service were sucked out of the aircraft as it disintegrated.

Without being able to better examine the wreckage, and lacking valid flight data from the final moments of the flight, it is not known what exactly happened after 05:59 GMT. Investigators concluded that apparently some sort of explosive device, likely located within the passenger cabin near the right wingbox, detonated at that time, causing unknown but catastrophic damage to the aircraft, including but not limited to the damage found on the horizontal and vertical stabilizer. The aircraft likely descended rapidly in an "erratic" manner. At an undetermined point in this descent, the horizontal stabilizer separated from the airplane entirely, and eventually the fuselage broke into the three sections initially found by searchers.

According to McBeth, experts had theorised that the person bombing the aircraft intended for it to fall into the ocean, which would make extracting information from the debris more difficult. McBeth said, "The Cathay Pacific bomber erred in his timing." The aircraft would have begun flying over water six minutes after the time the bomb detonated.

== Suspect and his behaviour ==
Somchai Chaiyasut (Note: Somchai Chaiyasut: Thai: สมชาย ไชยสุต) was a lieutenant in the Thai police organisation. He was based at the airport and a part of the police aviation division. He attended Adamson University where he married a Filipina woman and fellow student, Alice Villiagus; they divorced later due to Somchai's (Note: Thai people are politely referred to by their given names, not their family names. See Thai name.) parents disliking her. Somchai decided that their daughter, Sonthaya (Note: Sonthaya: Thai: สนธยา) Chaiyasut, should live in Thailand, and Villaigus accepted this arrangement.

Sonthaya, seven years old, and Somchai's girlfriend, 20-year-old Somwang Prompim (Note: Somwang Prompim: Thai: สมหวัง พร้อมพิมพ์), were passengers on CX700Z. Somwang worked at a coffee shop, and her family, low income and working in agriculture, came from Northeast Thailand. Somchai said Somwang was from a prominent family, and he said on insurance policies that she was his wife, when they had not formally married. To airport staff, Somwang seemed relatively uneducated and lacked English fluency.

Sonthaya's corpse was not found, but Somwang's corpse had mutilation that meant that a bomb had likely exploded in her location. Her legs past the knee were not present, and of the bodies, hers had the highest number of fragments. Her face and teeth were missing, frustrating identification. According to Cathay Pacific employees at Bangkok airport, Somwang only took hand baggage, a black cosmetic case, and did not check any luggage. Somchai had taken out travel accident insurance policies from American International Assurance and New Zealand Insurance, totaling 3,100,000 Thai baht, about $150,000 U.S. dollars. The former company insured Somwang for 1 million baht ($50,000 USD), and the latter insured Sonthaya for 100,000 baht and Somwang for 2 million baht.

According to the prosecution witnesses, Somchai had read Convair 880 and DC-8 manuals, drilled a hole in a cosmetics case, and inquired about the most destructive place where a bomb could be placed in an aircraft. According to Cathay Pacific staff, Somchai, whilst at the airport, had the seats of Sonthaya and Somwang changed so they would be positioned over the right wing. He, whilst wearing his uniform, went into the departure area, and onto the aircraft itself before takeoff. Somchai had called Cathay Pacific asking if the flight had successfully completed a landing even though the aircraft was about halfway in its journey. According to the prosecution in his trials, Somchai, upon visiting Saigon to view corpses, had, in the words of McBeth, "a macabre interest" and "showed little remorse". McBeth characterised the "weight of the evidence" against Somchai as "overwhelming" despite the fact that it was circumstantial in nature.

Initially, a Thai military official, Praphas Charusathien, one of Thailand's three rulers, had, in McBeth's words, along with other top members of Thai government departments, "ridiculously" said the case was "a plot to destroy Thailand's reputation." He had argued that, in McBeth's words, "a loving Thai father would never kill his daughter for money." Praphas accused Cathay Pacific of falsely stating that a bomb was planted on the plane to attract passengers to Kai Tak by sullying the reputation of the airport in Bangkok. McBeth described Praphas' statement about "a loving Thai father" as "emotionally nationalistic". Journalist Andrew MacGregor Marshall stated the ruling authorities in Thailand feared humiliation over a police officer being convicted of planting a bomb at the airport and wanted to nullify a possibility of conviction to keep their country's reputation.

Additional information was uncovered; Geoffrey Binstead, who worked as the security officer of Cathay Pacific, spoke with Villaigus, who told him that her husband went to nightclubs in Bangkok, a fact understood by law enforcement in Thailand. Binstead found a woman in Bangkok who stated that Somchai had offered her money to take his daughter shopping in Hong Kong, and she chose not to pursue the arrangement when he balked at paying her money up front. The woman said that a friend of Somchai later asked her to stay quiet about the events and offered her money as a reward.

According to McBeth, the attitude from Thai authorities changed due to additional information and due to demands from people outside of Thailand. Narong Kittikachorn, another of the three rulers of Thailand and the son in law of Prapas, stated that the Thai government would successfully prosecute the suspect. Somchai was arrested on 31 August 1972. Thanom Kittikachorn had ordered the arrest.

== Trials and acquittals ==
His first trial began on 11 May 1973. There were three judges. The main judge was Chitti Vuthipranee (Note: Chitti Vuthipranee: Thai: จิตติ วุฒิปาณี), who was the deputy director-general of the criminal court in Thailand. Somchai was represented by his father, Sont Chaiyasut. The prosecution called 67 witnesses while Sont called four. Somchai defended himself in court and said that he did not murder Sonthaya. McBeth described Somchai at the trial as "a nervous shadow of his former confident self". McBeth stated that there "appeared to be his overwhelming guilt" and that the case was "Thailand's version of the O.J. Simpson trial." Fifteen of the witnesses were not Thai, and the need for interpretation lengthened the trial.

The first acquittal happened on Thursday 30 May 1974. McBeth, who had attended the 700Z trial, stated that people attending the verdict reading had shouted and cheered, and were standing on furniture. Another trial ended on 2 April 1975, and Somchai was acquitted again. The second acquittal was announced in June 1975. According to McBeth, Thai law in the 1970s did not allow conviction from solely circumstantial evidence, even if said evidence was, in his words, "solid". The judges stated that a bomb had destroyed CX700Z, but Somchai could not be convicted because nobody saw him planting the bomb in the cosmetic case, and they did not understand why Somwang did not have pieces of the cosmetic case in her corpse and why she, whilst alive, did not notice additional weight in her cosmetic case.

McBeth also said that Chitti "seemed to harp back" to the same attitudes earlier expressed by Prapas, in uniquely disbelieving that a person with Thai ethnicity could murder one's own child for insurance money. According to McBeth, the verdict was "no doubt influenced by military strongman Prapat Charusathien's emotional claim". Luke Hunt of The Diplomat argued that the trial verdicts were an example of face saving seen in Thai society.

McBeth, in regards to the acquittal, stated, "No one seemed to understand or care what a travesty of justice it was." He had stated in his book, Reporter: Forty Years Covering Asia, "I was appalled that[...]many Thais seemed oblivious to the injustice of it all." Young wrote that many high-up Thai law enforcement personnel strongly believed Somchai was guilty or were not sure of his innocence, that there were "Friends of Thailand" who were afraid that the outcome of the CX700Z trials had, compared to the bombing act, done more damage to Thailand, and that "many more" Thais than those in favor of Somchai's not guilty verdict had believed "justice had been thwarted — on orders from General Prapas, or somebody." John Torinus, editor of the West Bend Daily News in the 1970s, stated, "Justice was not served." Binstead stated about the outcome, "Well - you win one, you lose one." According to Young, the acquittals resulted in "anger and bitterness."

== Aftermath ==
No other suspects were prosecuted by the Thai authorities nor did they have a suspect in mind they intended to prosecute.

A memorial was held at St John's Cathedral in Hong Kong. John Anthony Swire read the service's lesson. (Note: p. 190 of Young (ISBN 9780571287260) says "John Swire." p. 171 (Chapter 18) Identifies the "John Swire", who became the chairperson of John Swire & Sons in 1967, as the son of Jock Swire. This would be John Anthony Swire.)

Somchai sued the insurance companies and received 5.5 million baht (US$ 180,000).

Somchai collected the funds from the American company, and in 1978 the Supreme Court of Thailand ruled that Somchai could collect from the New Zealand company.

According to McBeth, "airline staff and relatives [had considered] hiring a hitman to kill him."

Somchai went up to the rank of a colonel, and retired from the Thai police service in 1983. He settled in the United States, but he developed cancer and went to Bangkok, dying in 1985, two weeks after his arrival. McBeth reported it as liver cancer. Young reported it as kidney cancer. He was 43 years old when he died. In regards to Somchai's death, McBeth said that this gave "belated closure", and that "Many people thought justice had finally prevailed." McBeth stated that the outcome was what "I, as a dedicated non-churchgoer, have always believed was the hand of God."

In his book, Young reported that "Thailand[...]easily survived this dismal affair." He added that, despite the crash, Cathay Pacific in 1972 had "the best financial year the Company had ever had." He added that the crash "failed to put passengers off either Cathay Pacific or its Convairs."

In regards to Malaysia Airlines Flight 370, McBeth stated "In some ways, there is an eerie similarity between the Cathay Pacific case and the MAS incident."

Due to the fact seven people from West Bend were on board, Torinus called it "West Bend's greatest tragedy". Headlines of articles about the crash in Wisconsin newspapers referred to it as the "Kenny Crash" or variants of that title, after the surname of the family. A West Bend resident, Andy Koehn, a nephew of the West Bend CEO, made a podcast, called "A Hazy Yellow Feeling," about the West Bend family and the crash that killed members of it.

== See also ==
- Japan Air Lines Flight 471 - A crash that took place just prior to CX700Z
