= Cathay Pacific Flight 033 =

1967 aviation incident in Hong Kong

- VR-HFX, the aircraft involved in the accident, pictured in 1966

Occurrence
- Date: 5 November 1967
- Summary: Runway overrun
- Site: Hong Kong International Airport (a.k.a. Kai Tak Airport), British Hong Kong

Aircraft
- Aircraft type: Convair 880
- Operator: Cathay Pacific
- Registration: VR-HFX
- Flight origin: Kai Tak Airport
- Stopover: Tan Son Nhut Airport in Saigon (now Ho Chi Minh City)
- 2nd stopover: Bangkok International Airport (Don Mueang International Airport)
- Destination: Dum Dum Airport (now Netaji Subhas Chandra Bose International Airport), Calcutta (now Kolkata)
- Passengers: 116
- Crew: 11
- Fatalities: 1
- Injuries: 28
- Survivors: 126

Cathay Pacific Flight 033 was a flight from Hong Kong to Saigon, Bangkok, and Calcutta. On 5 November 1967, the Convair 880M (VR-HFX) overran the runway on takeoff from Hong Kong International Airport (a.k.a. Kai Tak Airport) following a loss of control after the right nosewheel blew, killing 1 of 127 on board.

== Passengers and crew ==
There were four members of the flight crew and seven members of the cabin crew. The captain was W. Ron Jackson-Smith, the first officer was Ian P. Steven, the flight engineer was an Australian named James Kenneth "Ken" Hickey, and the check captain was J.R. "Bob" Howell, also from Australia. Howell was there to evaluate Steven and Jackson-Smith, and therefore this flight was a check flight. The cabin crew included ethnic Chinese from Hong Kong, and other members were from Japan and Thailand.

There were 116 passengers, many from South Korea and Vietnam. 10 or 12 of the passengers were from the United States. One passenger was from Australia.

As per the Hong Kong authorities, all members of the flight crew and all but one members of the cabin crew did not receive injury, while one member of the cabin crew received a minor injury. One passenger, a woman from South Vietnam, died. A skull fracture had killed her. As per the Hong Kong authorities, 16 passengers had minor injuries, 11 had serious injuries, and the remainder were not injured. 33 passengers were in hospital for treatment of injuries.

Hickey later was the flight engineer on Cathay Pacific Flight 700Z, which crashed in South Vietnam due to a bomb on 15 June 1972, killing Hickey and everyone else on board.

== Accident ==
The flight started its takeoff roll on runway 13 at 02:34 AM local time. At a speed of just under 120 knots, the crew felt a vibration that progressively got stronger as the plane continued gaining speed. The vibrations eventually became so severe that the crew decided to abort the takeoff. The brakes, spoilers and thrust reversers were applied. However, the plane started to veer to the right, away from the centerline of the runway. The crew applied left rudder to try to counteract the motion to the right which failed. The crew then applied differential braking as an alternative method, fully releasing the brakes on the right hand side (which were applied during the initial deceleration sequence after touchdown) and applied maximum left braking in addition to full left rudder. This only had a slight effect on the right-hand yaw of the aircraft but was not enough to fully bring the plane back to the runway. The aircraft exited the runway, sliding across the grass strip adjacent to it, still yawing to the right. It then crossed a seawall at a heading of 47 degrees from the centerline of the runway in a left "crab" configuration. The plane then left the seawall, rotating 180 degrees and coming to a stop near Kowloon Bay, facing the seawall. All 4 engines separated from the aircraft on impact with the rest of the plane severely damaged. Some pieces of the aircraft sunk into the mud of Kowloon Bay. One passenger onboard was killed with the remaining passengers and crew suffering only minor injuries.

The aircraft went past the seawall, and fell into the Hong Kong Harbour. The aircraft broke into two. Helicopters; Man Shun, a ferry; along with some tugboats and launches, went to rescue passengers. Howell assisted passengers in leaving the crashed aircraft. Some passengers put on life jackets.

Its crash site was very close to that of Thai Airways International Flight 601.

== Investigation ==
Cathay Pacific's internal report stated that the main reason why the accident occurred was the failure of a tyre. It did not assign blame to the flight crew.

The final accident report by the colonial Hong Kong government also did not assign blame to the flight crew.

The Hong Kong final accident report and Cathay Pacific's internal report both stated that the actions of the cabin crew helped ameliorate problems by managing passenger behaviour.

The final report issued by the CAD concluded that the cause of the crash was a loss of directional control resulting from separation of the tyre tread on the main landing gear and the inability for the crew to stop the aircraft within the adequate runway available due to the use of differential braking which affected the stopping capability of the aircraft as well as the tailwind present on takeoff.

As a result of the accident, the CAD also issued several recommendations:

1. The temperature of the aircraft's wheels should be checked after every flight to detect any possible malfunction of the braking system
2. Any personal belongings, such as passenger's luggage, should not obstruct or impede the evacuation route or process
3. Stricter loading procedures for ground staff which include checking and recording the total weight of the aircraft to prevent incorrect inputs and as a result, V1 speeds

== Aftermath ==
Hong Kong residents made a joke referring to the crash, "See the Bay with CPA", referring to Cathay Pacific. This joke circulated for a period.

The company was already highly utilising its aircraft, so having one less aircraft put pressure on the remaining aircraft.
