= Pleiku (city) =

Pleiku Plây Ku
- Provincial city (Class-1)
- Pleiku City; Thành phố Pleiku
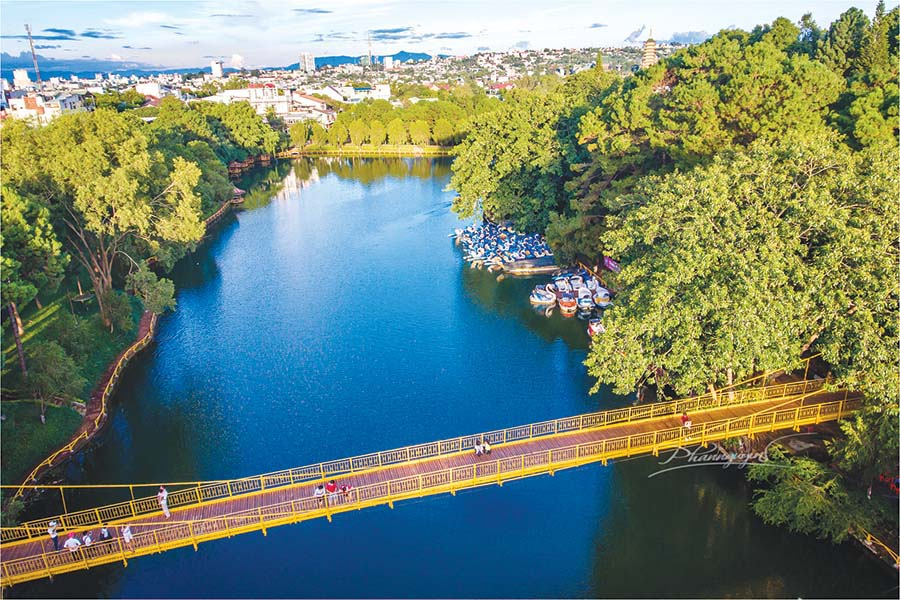
- From top to bottom, from left to right: Pleiku at night, Minh Thành pagoda, Đại đoàn kết square, Đức An lake, Biển Hồ

- Seal
- Interactive map of Pleiku
- Location of Pleiku in Vietnam
- Coordinates: 13°59′N 108°0′E
- Country: Vietnam
- Province: Gia Lai

Area
  - Total: 264.89 km^{2} (102.27 sq mi)
- Elevation: 740 m (2,430 ft)

Population (31/12/2024)
  - Total: 435.547
  - Density: 1.6443/km^{2} (4.2586/sq mi)
- Climate: Aw

Pleiku is a former city in central Vietnam, located in the Central Highlands region. It was the capital of the Gia Lai Province. Many years ago, it was inhabited primarily by the Bahnar and Jarai ethnic groups, sometimes known as the Montagnards or Degar, although now it is inhabited primarily by the Kinh ethnic group. The city is the centre of the urban district of Pleiku which covers an area of 260.77 km² (100 mi²).

As of 2024, the city has a population of around 331.178 people.

On 1 July 2025, Pleiku ceased to exist as a municipal city due to the elimination of district level units in Vietnam, and its territory was reorganized into five wards and two communes directly under Gia Lai Province.

== Name ==
The name Pleiku first appeared in the Governor-General of French Indochina records in 1905, in the decree that established the province of Gia Lai. The Decree of the Governor-General of Indochina dated July 4, 1905, established an autonomous province in the western mountainous region of Binh Dinh province, naming it Plei-Kou-Derr. This marked the first official use of the name Plei-Kou in writing.

The word Plơi means "village" in Jarai, while Kơdưr can mean either "north" or "upper". Therefore, the name Pleiku can be translated as "upper village" or "village in the north".

The word Derr is likely a Jarai word that was added to the name Pleiku by the French to distinguish it from other villages in the area. The name Pleiku has been used since the colonial period and is still the official name of the city today.

== History ==
=== First Indochina War ===
At the end of the First Indochina War, in June 1954, the French Army Groupe Mobile 100 was ordered to fall back from An Khê to Pleiku and then to reopen Route Coloniale 14 between Pleiku and Buôn Ma Thuột. This led to the last battle of the war: the Battle of Mang Yang Pass.

=== Second Indochina War ===
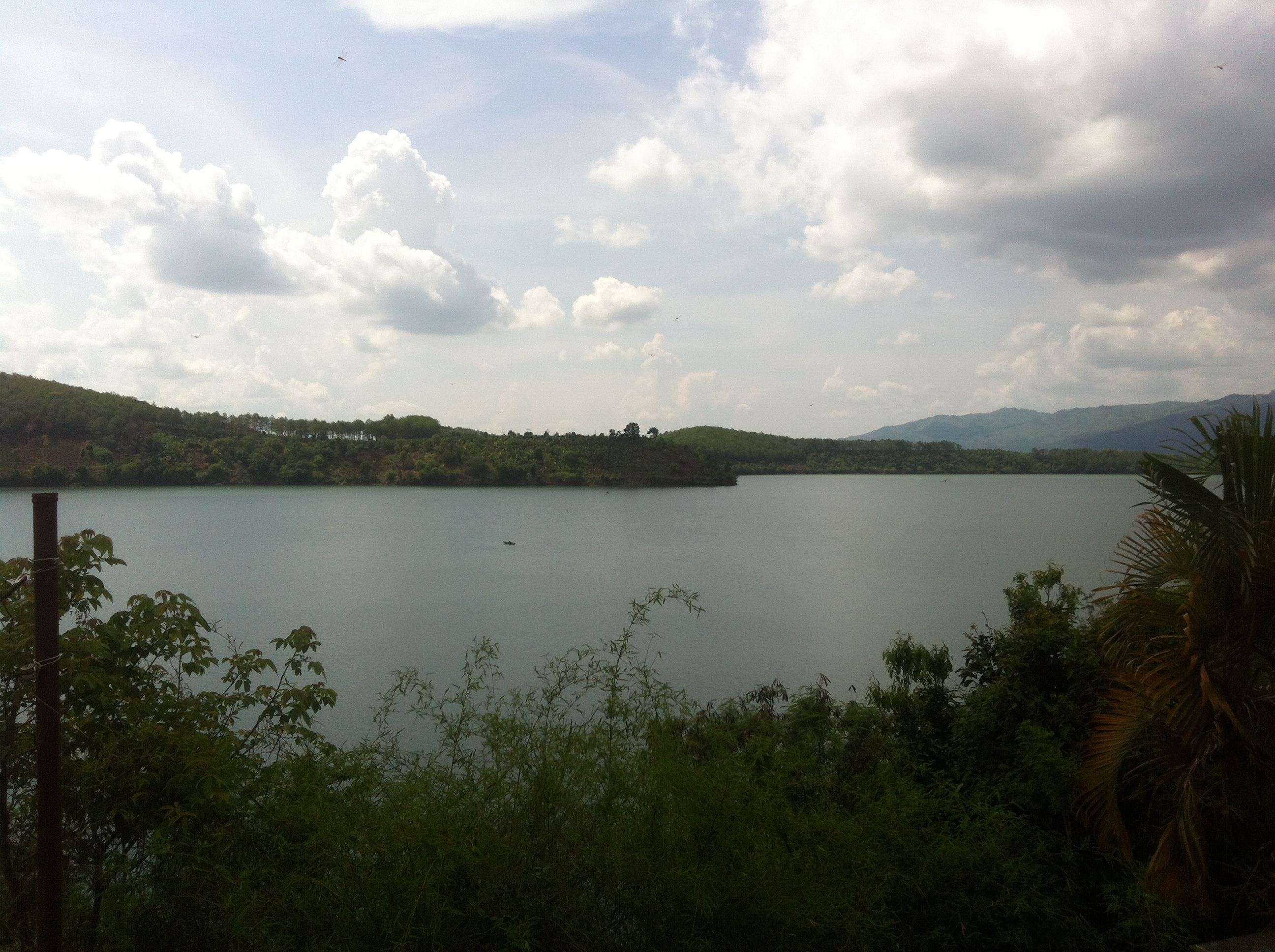
T' Nung Lake in outskirt of Pleiku

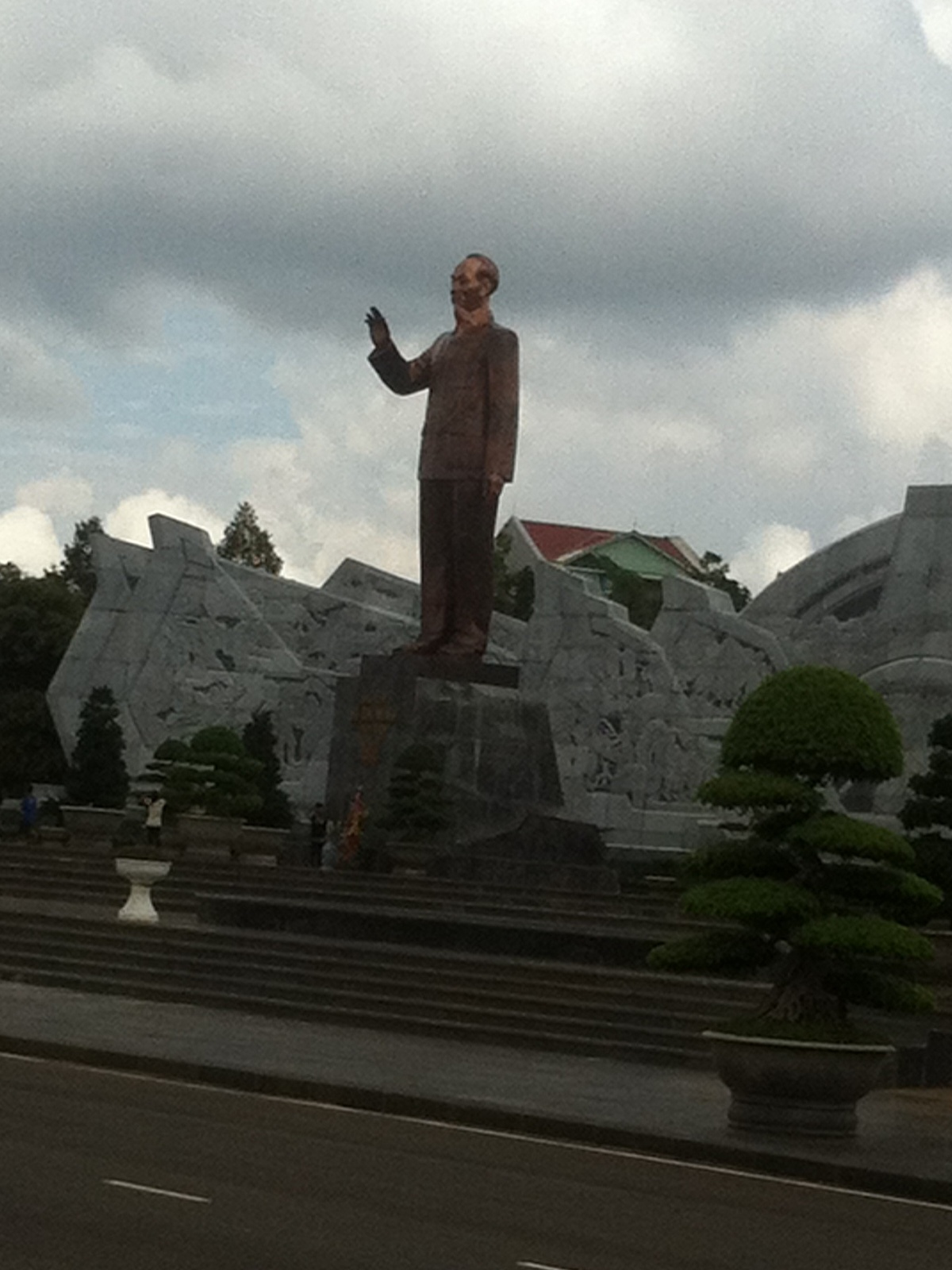
Pleiku Square in Pleiku

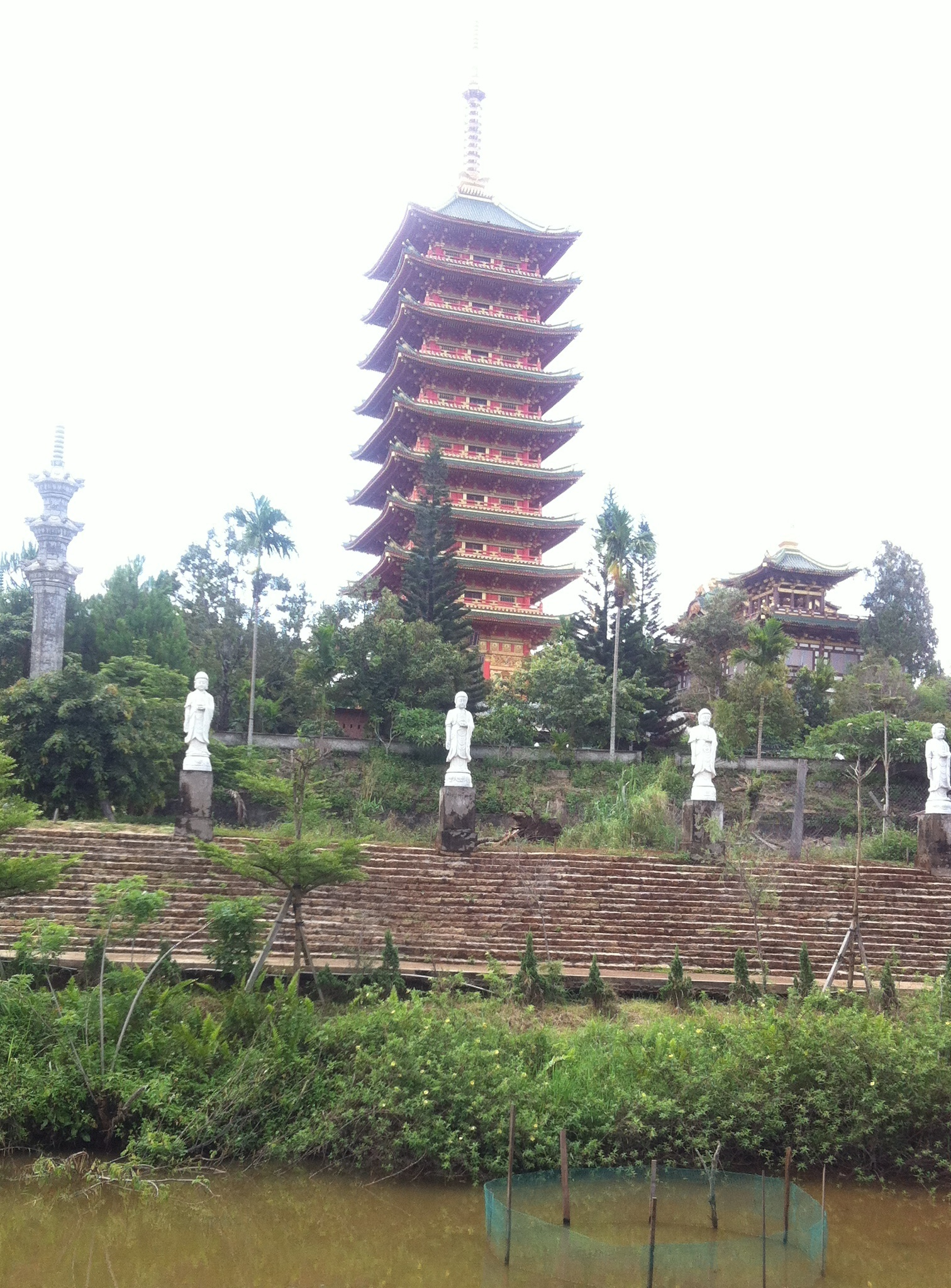
Minh Thanh Pagoda in Pleiku

Pleiku was strategically important during the Vietnam War because it was the primary terminus of the military supply logistics corridor extending westwards along Highway 19 from the coastal population centre and port facilities of Qui Nhơn. Additionally, its central location on the plateau, between Kon Tum to the North, Buôn Ma Thuột to the south, and the North Vietnamese Army's base areas inside Cambodia to the west made Pleiku the main centre of defense of the entire highland region of the Republic of Vietnam. This was obvious to both sides; the United States established an armed presence very early in the conflict at Camp Holloway, and the Việt Cộng attack on this base in early 1965 was one of the key escalating events that brought U.S. troops into the conflict.

On 15 June 1972, Cathay Pacific Flight 700Z, operating a Convair 880 (VR-HFZ) from Bangkok to Hong Kong, disintegrated and crashed while the aircraft was flying at 29,000 feet (8,800 m) after a bomb exploded in a suitcase placed under a seat in the cabin, killing all 81 people on board. The wreckage fell 30 miles (48 km) southeast of Pleiku.

After the fall of Buôn Ma Thuột to a major North Vietnamese assault in early 1975, and the resulting insecurity of National Route 19 leading from Qui Nhơn, the president, Nguyễn Văn Thiệu, ordered the hasty evacuation of Pleiku. The military operation to attempt the withdrawal of ARVN forces, down the poorly maintained tertiary road LTL-7B through Ayun Pa to Tuy Hòa, led to a catastrophe in which over 100,000 evacuees from Pleiku and Kon Tum were killed or left stranded without support.

== Geography ==
Pleiku is located in the center of Gia Lai province and borders:

- Dak Doa district to the east,
- Ia Grai district to the west,
- Chu Prong district to the south, and
- Chu Pah district to the north.

Pleiku is located between National Highway 14 and National Route 19 near the Indochina intersection of neighboring Cambodia and Laos on the Ho Chi Minh Highway. Pleiku occupies 26,076.8 hectares, and is the economic, political, cultural and social center of Gia Lai province. Pleiku is 465 km north of Ho Chi Minh City, 1,287 km south of Hanoi, 181 km from Buôn Ma Thuột and 377 km from Da Nang.

Pleiku is located at an average altitude of 700m - 800m; Ham Rong junction, or the junction of National Highway 14 and National Highway 19 south of Pleiku, has an altitude of 785m.

== Climate ==
Climate data for Pleiku, elevation 800 m (2,600 ft)
Month	Jan	Feb	Mar	Apr	May	Jun	Jul	Aug	Sep	Oct	Nov	Dec	Year
Record high °C (°F)	33.2 (91.8)	35.0 (95.0)	36.3 (97.3)	36.3 (97.3)	35.1 (95.2)	33.1 (91.6)	32.5 (90.5)	32.0 (89.6)	32.5 (90.5)	32.8 (91.0)	32.0 (89.6)	34.0 (93.2)	36.3 (97.3)
Mean daily maximum °C (°F)	26.4 (79.5)	28.5 (83.3)	30.5 (86.9)	31.1 (88.0)	29.5 (85.1)	27.4 (81.3)	26.7 (80.1)	26.4 (79.5)	26.9 (80.4)	27.1 (80.8)	26.4 (79.5)	25.8 (78.4)	27.7 (81.9)
Daily mean °C (°F)	19.0 (66.2)	20.6 (69.1)	22.7 (72.9)	24.2 (75.6)	23.9 (75.0)	23.1 (73.6)	22.5 (72.5)	22.3 (72.1)	22.3 (72.1)	21.9 (71.4)	20.8 (69.4)	19.4 (66.9)	21.9 (71.4)
Mean daily minimum °C (°F)	14.0 (57.2)	15.1 (59.2)	17.4 (63.3)	19.4 (66.9)	20.5 (68.9)	20.5 (68.9)	20.1 (68.2)	20.1 (68.2)	19.8 (67.6)	18.6 (65.5)	17.1 (62.8)	15.2 (59.4)	18.1 (64.6)
Record low °C (°F)	5.6 (42.1)	6.8 (44.2)	5.9 (42.6)	10.0 (50.0)	12.6 (54.7)	11.0 (51.8)	15.6 (60.1)	14.8 (58.6)	13.7 (56.7)	11.0 (51.8)	5.8 (42.4)	5.8 (42.4)	5.6 (42.1)
Average rainfall mm (inches)	2.4 (0.09)	6.7 (0.26)	24.2 (0.95)	92.8 (3.65)	249.2 (9.81)	322.9 (12.71)	396.1 (15.59)	462.7 (18.22)	358.9 (14.13)	190.8 (7.51)	62.8 (2.47)	10.8 (0.43)	2,179.9 (85.82)
Average rainy days	0.6	0.8	3.1	8.1	17.7	23.0	26.6	27.4	24.8	15.9	7.2	2.3	157.5
Average relative humidity (%)	76.6	73.7	72.0	75.1	82.9	89.1	90.8	91.9	90.4	86.1	82.1	79.0	82.5
Mean monthly sunshine hours	263.2	260.1	272.1	240.8	210.1	155.5	146.2	127.9	136.1	178.1	199.1	229.3	2,415.3
Source 1: Vietnam Institute for Building Science and Technology
Source 2: The Yearbook of Indochina (1930-1931 and 1937-1938)

== Demography ==
In 1971, during the Republic of Vietnam, Pleiku provincial capital had 34,867 residents. According to the statistical, the city's population includes 28 ethnic groups; The Kinh people make up the majority (87.5%), the rest are other ethnic groups, mainly the Gia Rai and Ba Na ethnic groups (12.5%). The number of people of working age is about 328,240 people, accounting for 65% of the population.

The natural population growth rate decreased rapidly, reaching 1.12% in 2008.

Ethnic minorities live mainly in villages such as Plei Op village (Hoa Lu ward), Kep village (Dong Da ward), Brúk Ngol village (Yen The ward), and some other villages. The entire urban area has 62,829 households with 274,048 people with permanent residence. Including the converted population, there are about 504,984 people.

== Administrative divisions ==
Pleiku city is divided into 22 commune-level administrative units, including 14 wards: Chi Lang, Dien Hong, Dong Da, Hoa Lu, Hoi Phu, Hoi Thuong, Ia Kring, Phu Dong, Tay Son, Thang Loi, Thong Nhat, Tra Ba, Yen Do, Yen The and 8 communes: An Phu, Bien Ho, Chu A, Dien Phu, Gao, Ia Kenh, Tan Son, Tra Da.

== Sports ==
The city is home to the Hoàng Anh Gia Lai football club.

== Transport ==
The city sits at the junction of several national roads—National Route 14 to Kon Tum in the north and Buôn Ma Thuột in the south and National Route 19 to Stung Treng in Cambodia in the west (via Ratanakiri Province) and to Bình Định Province in the east.

In addition, Pleiku is served by Pleiku Airport in the near outskirts of the city.
