= Ayun Pa (town) =

- District-level town (Class-4)
- Ayun Pa Town; Thị xã Ayun Pa
- Interactive map of Ayun Pa
- Location within Vietnam Location within Southeast Asia Location within Asia
- Coordinates: 13°23′38″N 108°26′27″E
- Country: Vietnam
- Region: Central Highlands
- Province: Gia Lai

Area
  - Total: 110.88 sq mi (287.18 km^{2})

Population (31/12/2024)
  - Total: 75,437
  - Density: 680.34/sq mi (262.68/km^{2})
- Time zone: UTC+07:00 (Indochina Time)

Ayun Pa is a former district-level town (thị xã) in Gia Lai Province, in the Central Highlands of Vietnam. It used to be known as Cheo Reo after 1975. Ayun Pa covers an area of 287.18 km^{2}, with a population of 75,437 (2024). The town is situated in the south-eastern part of Gia Lai Province. To the east and north-east is Ia Pa District, to the south-east is Krông Pa District, to the south is Ea H'leo District in Đắk Lắk Province and to the west is Phú Thiện District.

Ayun Pa town has 8 subdivisions, including 4 urban wards (phường): Cheo Reo, Hòa Bình, Đoàn Kết, Sông Bờ, and 4 communes (xã): Ia RTô, Chư Băh, Ia RBol and Ia Sao.

== Climate ==
Climate data for Ayun Pa
Month	Jan	Feb	Mar	Apr	May	Jun	Jul	Aug	Sep	Oct	Nov	Dec	Year
Record high °C (°F)	36.1 (97.0)	38.5 (101.3)	40.2 (104.4)	41.3 (106.3)	40.5 (104.9)	38.7 (101.7)	37.5 (99.5)	36.6 (97.9)	36.1 (97.0)	34.9 (94.8)	34.3 (93.7)	33.3 (91.9)	41.3 (106.3)
Mean daily maximum °C (°F)	28.7 (83.7)	31.0 (87.8)	33.8 (92.8)	35.7 (96.3)	34.6 (94.3)	32.9 (91.2)	32.3 (90.1)	31.9 (89.4)	31.6 (88.9)	30.4 (86.7)	29.1 (84.4)	27.7 (81.9)	31.7 (89.1)
Daily mean °C (°F)	22.5 (72.5)	24.1 (75.4)	26.5 (79.7)	28.5 (83.3)	28.5 (83.3)	27.8 (82.0)	27.2 (81.0)	26.9 (80.4)	26.4 (79.5)	25.5 (77.9)	24.3 (75.7)	22.8 (73.0)	25.9 (78.6)
Mean daily minimum °C (°F)	18.1 (64.6)	19.1 (66.4)	21.3 (70.3)	23.6 (74.5)	24.5 (76.1)	24.4 (75.9)	24.0 (75.2)	23.9 (75.0)	23.5 (74.3)	22.6 (72.7)	21.2 (70.2)	19.3 (66.7)	22.1 (71.8)
Record low °C (°F)	10.3 (50.5)	10.2 (50.4)	11.3 (52.3)	18.9 (66.0)	21.0 (69.8)	21.5 (70.7)	20.6 (69.1)	20.9 (69.6)	20.3 (68.5)	16.4 (61.5)	13.6 (56.5)	10.4 (50.7)	10.2 (50.4)
Average precipitation mm (inches)	2.2 (0.09)	3.7 (0.15)	13.8 (0.54)	58.6 (2.31)	164.8 (6.49)	131.7 (5.19)	126.0 (4.96)	159.2 (6.27)	220.8 (8.69)	215.1 (8.47)	149.2 (5.87)	29.0 (1.14)	1,274.1 (50.16)
Average rainy days	1.7	1.5	2.4	6.8	15.4	15.3	17.3	20.4	20.4	17.9	13.3	6.7	139.2
Average relative humidity (%)	78.0	74.8	71.1	70.8	75.5	78.2	79.7	81.9	84.4	85.7	84.1	81.2	78.8
Mean monthly sunshine hours	188.7	223.2	252.8	257.4	248.9	209.8	207.5	190.2	169.5	163.2	149.6	143.3	2,406.5
Source: Vietnam Institute for Building Science and Technology
