= Reporter: Forty Years Covering Asia =

2011 book by John McBeth

Reporter: Forty Years Covering Asia is a 2011 book by New Zealand author and journalist John McBeth, published by Talisman Publishing in Singapore. Reporter is an account of McBeth’s forty-year journey through Asia, more than half of that time as a correspondent for the Far Eastern Economic Review. An updated version, entitled Reporter: Fifty Years Covering Asia, was published in 2022.

== Content ==
During his career, McBeth reported on a wide range of stories that are recounted in Reporter. These include the investigation into the loss of Cathay Pacific Flight 700Z, which crashed near Pleiku in the Central Highlands of Vietnam on 5 June 1972 after a bomb detonated on board. The suspect accused of planting the bomb, Somchai Chaiyasut, a Thai police officer, was acquitted twice, and died of liver cancer in 1985 aged 43. McBeth believed Chaiyasut was guilty and that the acquittals were unfair. After the suspect's death, according to McBeth, "[m]any people thought justice had finally prevailed".

The book includes an account of Herman Knippenberg's relentless pursuit of the Vietnamese-Indian serial killer Charles Sobhraj. Frustrated by the lack of interest from the Thai police, Knippenberg had done almost all of the investigation himself. McBeth noted that Sobhraj, a French national, managed to elude justice for so long because Thai police, in particular, could not conceive of a foreign serial killer preying on other foreigners. As he later wrote, by the time the Thais were prodded into action, twelve people had fallen victim to "the psychotic Frenchman who may have been the real-life incarnation of one of fiction's most dangerous characters - a cultured, cunning, satanically handsome villain with a compulsion to do evil".

Reporter also contains details of McBeth's investigation into the break-up of major heroin trafficking rings who, during the Vietnam War, used the US military postal service and hundreds of airforce transport aircraft to transport heroin between South-East Asia and homeland bases in the United States. One such ring set up a nationwide African-American distribution network which was the first to challenge the Mafia's traditional domination of the narcotics trade.

Other stories covered by McBeth and featured in the book include the crackdown on the Burmese warlord and "Opium King", Khun Sa, the North Korean bombing of the Martyrs' Mausoleum in Rangoon in 1983 that killed 21 people including several South Korean Cabinet ministers, the scandal involving Bre-X and a purported enormous gold deposit at Busang in Indonesia which led to the largest fraud in the history of mining, and the Bali bombings.

McBeth sets out his observations concerning the end of the Review, which was finally closed in 2009. Along with Asiaweek, it used to be read for its insights into local politics by every English-speaking diplomat and business person in the region. After its acquisition by the giant Dow Jones empire in the early 1990s, it was commercialized, downsized, and trivialised by an American management team unfamiliar with Asian cultures and values.

McBeth also responds in Reporter to the Australian journalist John Pilger's accusation in the British New Statesman magazine that he worked for the CIA. This allegation was seemingly based on McBeth's brief appearance as a marine in The Deer Hunter and the fact that he had written an article for the CIA-funded news service, Forum World Features. According to McBeth, Pilger's allegation was "based on the fact that I had a lot of CIA contacts".

Being one of the few journalists who detected early on the horrifying extent of the Khmer Rouge Killing Fields purges, McBeth singles out in Reporter certain academics and journalists who became apologists for Pol Pot despite overwhelming evidence of atrocities committed by his cohorts and the Khmer Rouge.

== Reception ==
Richard Broinowski reviewed Reporter in the Australian Book Review and states that "McBeth belongs to a small club of foreign correspondents who, by way of thorough investigation, made sense of events in Asia during the tumultuous 1970s, 1980s, and 1990s". Broinowski writes that Reporter should be "compulsory reading for every student of media studies in the English-speaking world".

In his review of Reporter in The Diplomat, Luke Hunt describes the book as containing "candid accounts" and calls it "a terrific read". Hunt states that Reporter will find "an instant audience for anyone interested in Southeast Asia and the media". In a review that Hunt wrote for The Correspondent, a publication of the Foreign Correspondents' Club of Hong Kong, he felt that the content about the destruction of Cathay Pacific Flight 700Z is "[a]mong [McBeth's] most engaging stories". Hunt's criticisms of Reporter relate to McBeth's "assumptions of young journalists as being of not quite the same calibre as he and his peers", his "distaste for the digital era", and his "stereotyping".

Tim Hume, in the Sunday Star-Times, wrote that the work is interesting compared to "the reality of modern corporate journalism", saying it "is salt air to the nostrils". In his review, Hume stated that he asked his girlfriend "Where can I go to live this guy's life?" Her reply was "the 1970s".
