= Krông Pa district =

Coordinates: 13.250°N 108.667°E

Krông Pa district Huyện Krông Pa
- District
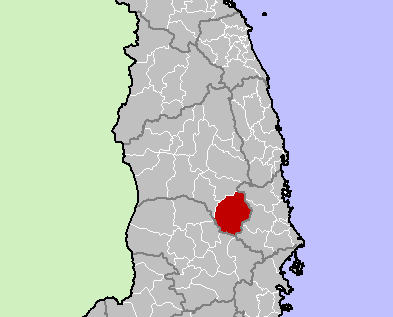
- Location in Gia Lai province
- Country: Vietnam
- Region: Central Highlands
- Province: Gia Lai province
- Capital: Phú Túc

Area
  - Total: 626.90 sq mi (1,623.66 km^{2})

Population (31/12/2024)
  - Total: 98,677
  - Density: 157.41/sq mi (60.774/km^{2})
- Time zone: UTC+7 (Indochina Time)

Krông Pa is a district (huyện) of Gia Lai province in the Central Highlands region of Vietnam.

As of 2024 the district had a population of 98,677. The district covers an area of 1,623.66 km². The district capital lies at Phú Túc.
