= Lighthouse Reports =

Investigative journalism organization

- Lighthouse Reports logo
- Website type: Nonprofit
- Available in: English
- Founded: 2019; 7 years ago
- Founders: Ludo Hekman, Klaas van Dijken
- Managing director: Daniel Howden
- Industry: journalism
- Website: www.lighthousereports.com

Lighthouse Reports is a not-for-profit collaborative newsroom organization. Lighthouse Reports was established in the Netherlands in 2019. The organization builds newsroom around specific topics and investigations in collaboration with media partners.

Lighthouse collaborates with many media outlets. Media partners from past investigations include The Guardian, EU Scream, Wired, Der Spiegel, ARD Monitor and Libération.

== Investigations ==
Investigations by Lighthouse Reports covered migration, Frontex, algorithm fraud, live stock industry, plastic waste and others.

== Awards ==
Lighthouse Reports won the IJ4EU Impact Award in 2023 for work on illegal paramilitary operatives responsible for pushbacks of migrants in EU countries. It also won the One World Media Reporting Award in 2025 for a series of articles on the propaganda of agrochemical and biotech companies in defense of pesticides and GMOs in Africa and Europe.
