= Far Eastern Economic Review =

Asian business magazine (1946–2009)

- Far Eastern Economic Review, final issue, December 2009
- Former editors: Eric Halpern, Dick Wilson, Derek Davies, Philip Bowring
- Categories: News magazine
- Frequency: Weekly, later monthly
- Founder: Eric Halpern
- Founded: 1946
- First issue: October 16, 1946
- Final issue: December 2009
- Based in: Hong Kong
- Language: English
- Website: feer.com
- ISSN: 0014-7591

Far Eastern Economic Review
- Traditional Chinese: 遠東經濟評論
- Simplified Chinese: 远东经济评论
Transcriptions
Standard Mandarin
- Hanyu Pinyin: Yuǎndōng Jīngjì Pínglùn
Yue: Cantonese
- Jyutping: jyun5 dung1 ging1 zai3 ping4 leon6

The Far Eastern Economic Review (FEER or The Review) was an Asian business magazine published from 1946 to 2009. The English-language news magazine was based in Hong Kong and published weekly until it converted to a monthly publication in December 2004 because of financial difficulties.

The Review covered a variety of topics including politics, business, economics, technology, and social and cultural issues throughout Asia, focusing on Southeast Asia and Greater China.

== History ==
=== Founding ===
The Far Eastern Economic Review was started in 1946 by Eric Halpern, a Jewish immigrant from Vienna. Halpern founded the magazine believing that Asia would become stable after World War II and that English would be widely used in the region among merchants, students and bankers. Before the Review, he had settled in Shanghai and worked for Finance and Commerce, a biweekly business magazine that shut down in December 1941 after the Japanese military invaded the city during the Second Sino-Japanese War.

The first issue was published on 16 October 1946.

The Kadoorie family, Jardines, and the HSBC provided seed capital for the Review.

After Halpern's retirement in 1958, Dick Wilson became chief editor and publisher. He operated an office in a colonial building along the waterfront where the Mandarin Hotel is now located. During Wilson's tenure, the magazine extended its coverage from China and Hong Kong to other regions, including Japan, Australia, India, and the Philippines.

In 1964 Wilson was succeeded as editor by Derek Davies, a Welsh journalist who had served in the British Foreign Office. Between 1964 and 1989, the Review became one of Asia's most authoritative magazines, with a circulation of nearly 90,000. At its peak, the Review had nearly 100 news staff members in 15 bureaus across Asia, making it the largest editorial team of any regional weekly publication.

In 1972, the South China Morning Post gained a majority ownership of the Review.

=== Dow Jones ownership ===
In 1987, Dow Jones, a minority shareholder since 1973, took full control of the Review after it acquired the 51% stake owned by the South China Morning Post. Davies stepped down as editor in 1989 after he lost a libel case against the Singapore Prime Minister Lee Kuan Yew.

After serving 25 years as senior editor, Davies was succeeded by Philip Bowring. In 1992, Bowring resigned due to differences with Dow Jones's vice-president Karen Elliott House over the magazine's editorial direction.

In November 2001, Dow Jones merged the editorial operations of the Review and the Asian Wall Street Journal to cut costs. Three years later, the magazine became a monthly publication and had fired 80 employees, representing 10% of Dow Jones's staff in Asia. Articles were largely commissioned, and only a skeleton editorial staff was retained. David Plott, the magazine's editor at the time, said the cuts resulted in a loss of one of the "greatest concentrations of knowledge and expertise about the region assembled anywhere".

After the Review became a monthly in December 2004, most articles were contributed by non-staff specialists, including economists, business-community figures, government policymakers and social scientists.

=== Closure ===
The Review published its final issue in December 2009 after reducing its staff several times since 2001. Bowring said the magazine declined because of the quick changing of editors, efforts to dumb down the magazine to make it more readable and to move away from hard-hitting, controversial coverage of corporate and financial scandals under the ownership of Dow Jones and House's leadership. Former editors David Plott and Michael Vatikiotis said attributing the decline to interference from Dow Jones was unfair, and attributed the Review's closure to a series of business mismanagement that forced the magazine to reduce its workforce and limited potential revenue from advertising.

In September 2009, Dow Jones announced that the magazine would be shut down permanently because of declining readership and advertising revenue. The Economist said the Review relied on advertising revenue and its business model failed when Western luxury brands no longer wished to appeal to Asian elites.

Dow Jones said the savings from the death of the Review will "catapult the company's growth in the burgeoning Asian marketplace". In response, Jonathan Manthorpe commented, "As the Review has been in a vegetative state since at least 2004 when it was made a monthly instead of weekly magazine and its staff was cut from 80 to five, only two of whom are journalists, it is hard to imagine the proceeds of closure catapulting anything anywhere."

"Dow Jones's marketing people didn’t know how to sell it as it competed with the Asian Wall Street Journal—they ignored it and killed it by sheer neglect," said V.G. Kulkarni, a former editor at the Review.

"The final insult to the Review, and indeed to Asia, was Dow Jones' refusal to sell the title. It has had plenty of offers—which would benefit its own shareholders", says Bowring, "There is a parallel here between Time and Asiaweek. Time bought locally born Asiaweek even though it appeared to be in direct competition for readers and advertising. Not so long afterwards, Time closed Asiaweek rather than its ailing Time Asia. It was corporate imperialism more than commercial sense which brought Dow Jones to buy control of the Review, which was a direct competitor for niche regional advertising. It is clear that the closure of the Review, as of Asiaweek, represents an attack on diversity and further reduction in the variety of print media."

"The magazine lost its way because people in New York thought they understood what the readers wanted more than those who were on the ground in Asia", wrote Bowring. Bowring claims that House infused the Review's editorials with the right wing and furiously pro-western sentiments of The Wall Street Journal.

Under its previous editor, Derek Davies, the Review had carved a name for itself for the excellence of its economic reporting, its refusal to be cowed and its wide-ranging book reviews. When Dow Jones took over the Review it introduced pompous "editorials"; indulged in numerous revisions to the format, each more disastrous than the last; brought in large numbers of American journalists and editors at the expense of well-established writers who knew the region; moved the focus from business and politics to "innovation" and "lifestyle", neither of which was of interest to its core readership; and dramatically reduced the scope of the book review section. When Dow Jones took control of the magazine, efforts to introduce more lifestyle features sparked protests from Review loyalists—as did its decision to make it into a monthly rather than a weekly title.

"I don't think Dow Jones ever understood what our culture was and they never really put in the effort to make the magazine succeed", said John McBeth, who joined the magazine in 1979. Dow Jones turned it into a snappy, happy, trend-conscious delight for the Internet age. It was a failed effort "to lure readers who presumably don't care about thoughtful coverage of politics and economics but do want to know which wine goes with which chili pepper." The reporting staff of the Review and the Asian Wall Street Journal were merged in 2001. More significantly, at that time the ad sales staff of the two publications were also merged. Two senior correspondents said they had frequently been asked by executives at Asian corporations they covered why the magazine's advertising staff were hard to reach and would often not return phone calls. "There was no effort put in", said one. "They didn't even try." McBeth gave an account of the closure of the Review in a chapter called 'Death of a Magazine' in his book entitled Reporter: Forty Years Covering Asia

T. J. S. George, co-founder of Asiaweek, says, "In due course, Time Inc. killed Asiaweek and Dow Jones (now a Murdoch property) killed the Review. Murdoch–Dow's Wall Street Journal and Time Inc.'s Time magazine now fly the American flag over Asia, unchallenged by lesser flags."

== Independent journalistic establishments ==
Besides qualified business reports, the Review was also the pioneer of independent journalistic establishments throughout Asia. Many of the articles from the first few decades were exclusive sources of information on the development of China, such as the reports on Chairman Mao Zedong, the Cultural Revolution, and the economic opening initiated by Deng Xiaoping.

== Readership ==
the Review targeted markets in Hong Kong, Malaysia, and Southeast Asia. It reached an elite group of readers from the government, the business world and the academic sector. The magazine had a circulation of 93,055 in 2003. In September 2006, the magazine was banned in Singapore.

== Reports by the Review ==
"China's Elite" was a yearly side-publication by the Review. Focusing on China's leading executives and their way of business, "China's Elite" was often praised as a valuable source of information on statistics, expectations, and objective analysis obtained through in-depth interviews with leading businessmen in Beijing, Shanghai, and Guangzhou.

The "Review 200" was a tied publication by the Far Eastern Economic Review that ranked the top 200 leading businesses across Asia on an annual basis.

Published every two years since 1989 by the Review, "Managing in Asia" provided entrepreneurs with a clear description and explanation of Asia's business position. The report offered valuable information in the aspects of economic outlook, business challenges and economic issues, personal investment, technology/office automation, brand perception, ownership of products, travel habits, etc.

The "Asia Lifestyles" was published in alternating years. It conducted surveys on business executives and questioned their lifestyles, habits, and aspirations.

The Review regularly published special reports focused on topics that were relevant and significant to Asia. For example, a special report on the HIV/AIDS epidemic was published in its 15 July 2004 issue.

The Review regularly interviewed government officials and other important people who had an impact in the region and the business world. In the past, the Review has interviewed Colin Powell, the U.S. former secretary of state (issue date: 28 October 2004); Kofi Annan, the secretary-general of United Nations (issue date: 22 July 2004); Chen Shui-bian, the Taiwanese president (issue date: 24 July 2003); Bill Gates, chairman and co-founder of Microsoft (issue date: 14 March 2002); and many more influential people.

In 2002 and 2003 the Review was awarded the "Excellence in Specialized Reporting" by the Society of Publishers in Asia (SOPA). In 2004 it was awarded the "Honourable Mention for Magazine Front Cover Design" by SOPA. In 2005 it was awarded the "Excellence in Magazines" and "Honorable Mention for Reporting on the Environment" by the SOPA.

== Legal issues ==
The Review's China correspondent, Serge Ivanovitch Kost, was arrested there during the Cultural Revolution and sentenced to 15 years' imprisonment. He later emigrated to Australia.

In late 1970s, Ho Kwon Ping, the Review's Singapore correspondent, was accused of endangering national security, jailed and held in solitary confinement for two months under the Internal Security Act, performed a televised confession, and was fined S$3,000.

Lee Kuan Yew later charged the Review editor, Derek Davies, of participating in "a diabolical international Communist plot" to poison relations between Singapore and neighbouring Malaysia.

In 1987 Lee restricted sale of the Review in Singapore after it published an article about the detention of Roman Catholic church workers, reducing circulation of the magazine from 9,000 to 500 copies, on the grounds that it was "interfering in the domestic politics of Singapore."

Malaysian Prime Minister Mahathir Mohamad filed a lawsuit against the Review in 1987 over an article published by the magazine, which claimed that the Malaysian government intended to sell Limbang to Brunei. Both parties reached an out-of-court settlement in March 1991, with the magazine agreeing to publish an apology notice and pay a settlement fee of fifty thousand Malaysian ringgit.

The 4 April 2002 issue of the Review was banned in Bangladesh because its cover story, "Bangladesh: Cocoon of Terror", described the country as besieged by "Islamic fundamentalism, religious intolerance, militant Muslim groups with links to international terrorist groups."

In 2006, after the publication of an article of an interview with Chee Soon Juan, party leader of the Singapore Democratic Party, on Singapore's prime minister Lee Hsien Loong and his father and minister mentor, Lee Kuan Yew, Lee Kuan Yew and Lee Hsien Loong both sued the publication for defamation, alleging the magazine had suggested they were corrupt. The Singapore government banned the sale and distribution of the journal.

In 2007, during the International Bar Association's Rule of Law symposium, then-deputy prime minister S. Jayakumar states that the Review did not satisfy regulations for foreign publications in Singapore such as appointing a representative to accept service of any notice or legal process, and submitting a security deposit. The lack of compliance to the regulations led to the Review not being able to circulate its publication in Singapore and was not due to the legal suit.

On 24 September 2008, the High Court of Singapore, in a summary judgement by Justice Woo Bih Li, ruled that the Far Eastern Economic Review and Hugo Restall, its editor, defamed Lee Kuan Yew and his son, Prime Minister Lee Hsien Loong in its October 2006 article "Singapore's 'Martyr', Chee Soon Juan". FEER appealed but lost the case when the Court of Appeal ruled in October 2009 that the Far Eastern Economic Review did defame the country's founder Lee Kuan Yew and his son Prime Minister Lee Hsien Loong.

== Awards presented by the Review ==
The Young Inventors Awards (YIA), which began in 2000, was organised by the Review in association with Hewlett-Packard (HP). The purpose of the Awards program was to foster a spirit of scientific invention and innovation among students in the Asia–Pacific regions, including China, Philippines, Singapore, India, and Australia. Students who won the award were socially recognised and financially supported for their outstanding efforts and projects. The Review also presented the annual Asian Innovation Awards.

== See also ==
- Media of Hong Kong
- Newspapers in Hong Kong
