= Ayun Pa =

- Ward
- Interactive map of Ayun Pa
- Coordinates: 13.400375074950038°N 108.43481645806129°E
- Country: Vietnam
- Region: South Central Coast and Central Highlands
- Province: Gia Lai
- Established: 16 June 2025
- Administrative headquarters: 63 Nguyễn Huệ Street

Area
  - Total: 17.61 km^{2} (6.80 sq mi)

Population (31 December 2024)
  - Total: 26,820
  - Density: 1,522/km^{2} (3,940/sq mi)
- Website: ayunpa.gialai.gov.vn

Ayun Pa is a ward in Gia Lai province, Vietnam. The ward inherited its name from the former town of Ayun Pa.

On 16 June 2025, the Standing Committee of the National Assembly of Vietnam issued Resolution No. 1664/NQ-UBTVQH15 on the arrangement of commune-level administrative units in Gia Lai province in 2025. Under the resolution, the entire area and population of Đoàn Kết, Sông Bờ, Cheo Reo, and Hòa Bình wards, formerly part of Ayun Pa town, were merged to form a new ward named Ayun Pa.
