= James Kanter =

Journalist

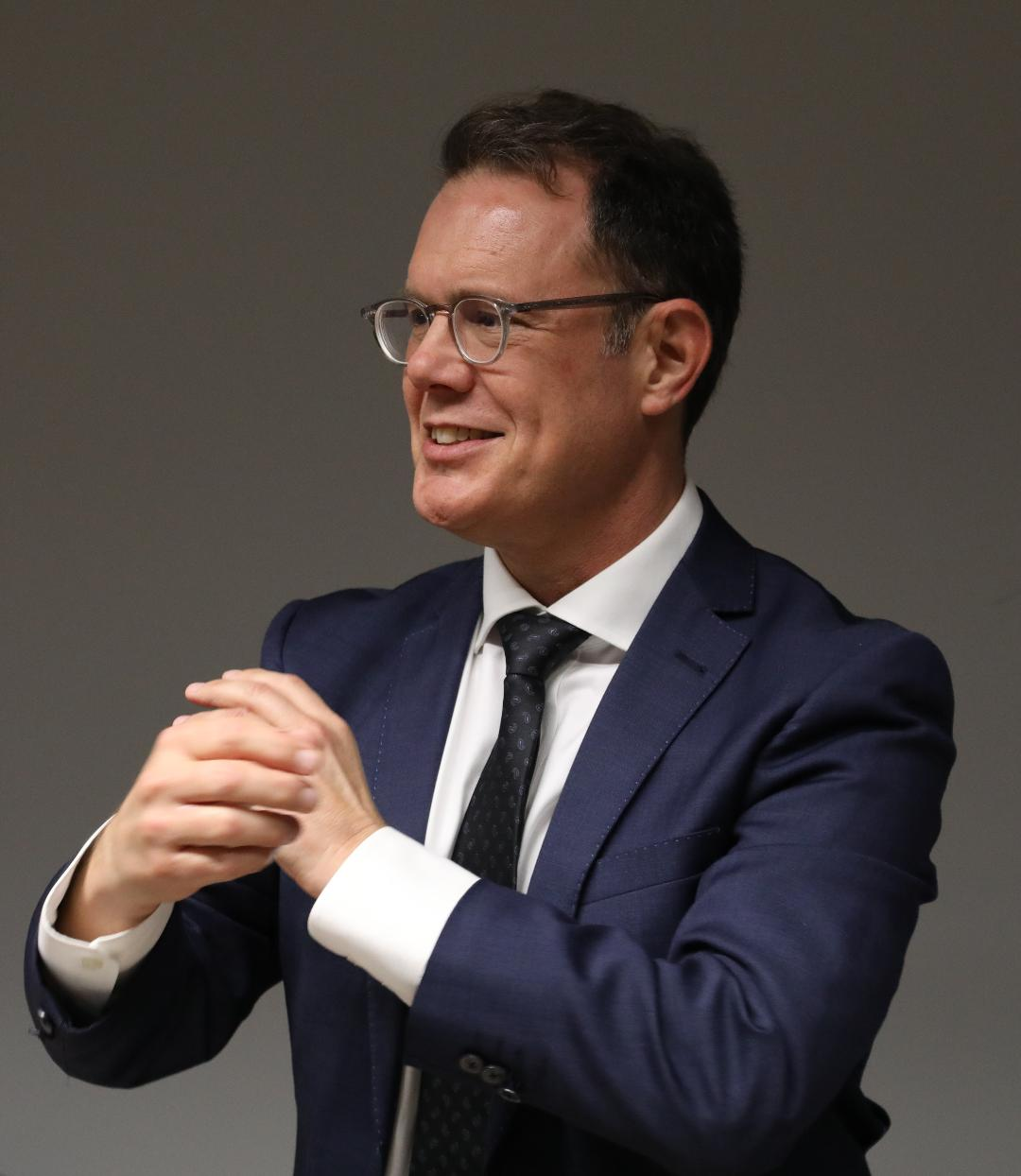
- James Kanter in 2018
- Education: Columbia University, Yale Law School, City, University of London
- Occupations: Journalist and editor

James Kanter is an American and British award-winning journalist and Brussels-based commentator on European Union (EU) affairs.

Kanter helped establish the first independent newspaper in Cambodia after the fall of the Khmer Rouge rule, The Cambodia Daily, where he served as editor in chief from 1995 to 1997.

Kanter was the correspondent for the International Herald Tribune and The New York Times in Brussels for 12 years until leaving the paper in 2017 to launch EU Scream in 2018, a podcast on European affairs.

According to the news website EURACTIV and the consulting firm ZN Consulting, Kanter counts among the most influential people in the "Brussels bubble".

== Education ==
Kanter earned a bachelor's degree from Columbia University. He holds master's degrees from Yale Law School and from City, University of London.

== European politics ==
As the correspondent of The New York Times in Brussels, Kanter questioned some aspects of the functioning of the European institutions, such as power dynamics at the EU summits. He also made skeptical comments of the functioning of the Belgian parliamentary system.

Kanter warned that "too many people working for the EU institutions don't see the big picture" in reference to the threats to the European project that the nationalist and nativist forces in Europe represent.

He reported on antitrust issues from the perspective of American companies.

In 2018, after leaving The New York Times, Kanter launched the podcast EU Scream focused on civil society issues in the EU.

=== UK citizens rights in the Brexit context ===
Kanter expressed concerns early on about the Brexit referendum and about what it would mean for UK citizens. After the Brexit referendum of 2016, he became an advocate for British citizens seeking to obtain an EU passport in another country in order to preserve their rights.

== Awards ==
In 2009 Kanter won the UACES/Thomson Reuters Reporting Europe prize. Kanter was awarded the prize for his reporting on the European Union Emissions Trading System.
