= EU Scream =

- Genre: Political podcast
- Language: English

Production
- Production: James Kanter

Publication
- Original release: November 2018

Related
- Website: EU Scream

EU Scream is a podcast based in Brussels. EU Scream was set up in 2018 by Tom Brookes from the European Climate Foundation and by James Kanter from The New York Times. James Kanter had left the New York Times before the launch of EU Scream.

EU Scream's episodes consist of interviews with European politicians, journalists, academics, activists and representatives of the civil society. The interviews often include personal aspects of the life of European politicians, for example the experience of being bullying at school shared on EU Scream by the Vice-President of the European Commission Frans Timmermans.

The Swedish European Commissioner Ylva Johansson when discussing her new immigration policy proposal on EU Scream, explained that the question was personal to her because her sister had been adopted from Korea. The economist Barry Eichengreen discussed on EU Scream his personal family history with populism. The journalist and human rights activist Maris Hellrand explained on EU Scream how she staged the very first protest against the Conservative People's Party of Estonia government.

The podcast denounced the authoritarian threat to civil liberties in Europe in the context of the COVID-19 pandemic.

EU Scream is a non-for-profit organization and hosts events on European policy and democracy, including on questions of algorithmic bias.

In 2023, EU Scream, in a joint investigation with Lighthouse Reports and The Guardian, shed light on the live stock lobbying in the European Union. The investigation focused on a group called European Livestock Voice, co-founded by the global agriculture lobby CopaCogeca. European Livestock Voice deployed techniques such as questioning science to argue against EU legislative proposals to protect animal welfare.

== See also ==
- Political podcast
