= Phú Túc, Gia Lai =

Phú Túc Xã Phú Túc
- Commune
- Phú Túc commune
- Location within Vietnam
- Coordinates: 13°11′45″N 108°41′13″E
- Country: Vietnam
- Region: Central Highlands
- Province: Gia Lai
- Time zone: UTC+7 (UTC + 7)

Phú Túc is a commune (xã) of Gia Lai Province, Vietnam.
