= Pleiku =

- Ward
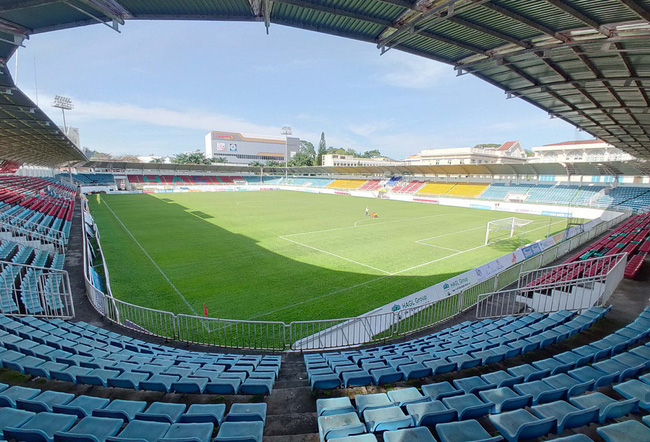
- Pleiku Stadium

- Location in Vietnam
- Coordinates: 13.977598618850685°N 107.99985748033603°E
- Country: Vietnam
- Region: South Central Coast and Central Highlands
- Province: Gia Lai
- Established: 2025
- Administrative headquarters: 81 Hùng Vương Street

Area
  - Total: 25.00 km^{2} (9.65 sq mi)

Population (31 December 2024)
  - Total: 79,466
  - Density: 3,178/km^{2} (8,230/sq mi)
- Website: pleiku.gialai.gov.vn

Pleiku is a ward in Gia Lai province, Vietnam. The ward inherited its name from the former city of Pleiku, the provincial capital of Gia Lai.

On 16 June 2025, the Standing Committee of the National Assembly of Vietnam issued Resolution No. 1664/NQ-UBTVQH15 on the arrangement of commune-level administrative units in Gia Lai province in 2025. Under the resolution, the entire area and population of Tây Sơn, Hội Thương, Hoa Lư, and Phù Đổng wards, and Trà Đa commune, formerly part of Pleiku city, were merged to form a new ward named Pleiku.
