= Kornhill =

Apartment buildings in Hong Kong

Coordinates: 22°16′58″N 114°12′59″E

Kornhill, Kornhill Gardens
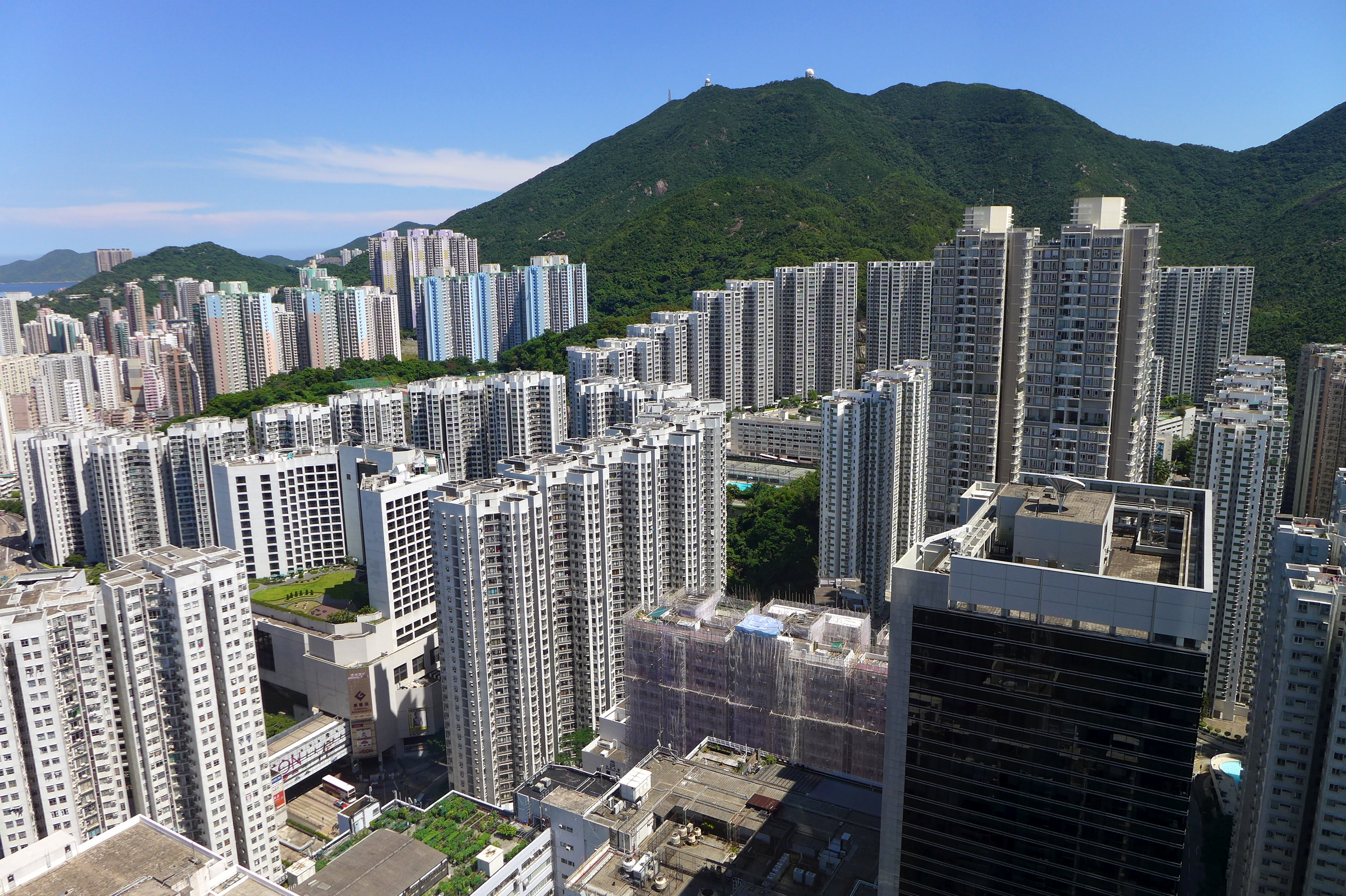
- Kornhill apartment buildings.
- Interactive map of the Kornhill, Kornhill Gardens area

General information
- Construction started: 1980; 46 years ago
- Completed: 1986; 40 years ago

Kornhill
- Traditional Chinese: 康怡花園
Transcriptions
Yue: Cantonese
- Yale Romanization: Hōng yìh fā yùhn
- Jyutping: Hong1 ji4 faa1 jyun4

Kornhill Gardens
- Traditional Chinese: 康山花園
Transcriptions
Yue: Cantonese
- Yale Romanization: Hōng sāan fā yùhn
- Jyutping: Hong1 saan1 faa1 jyun4

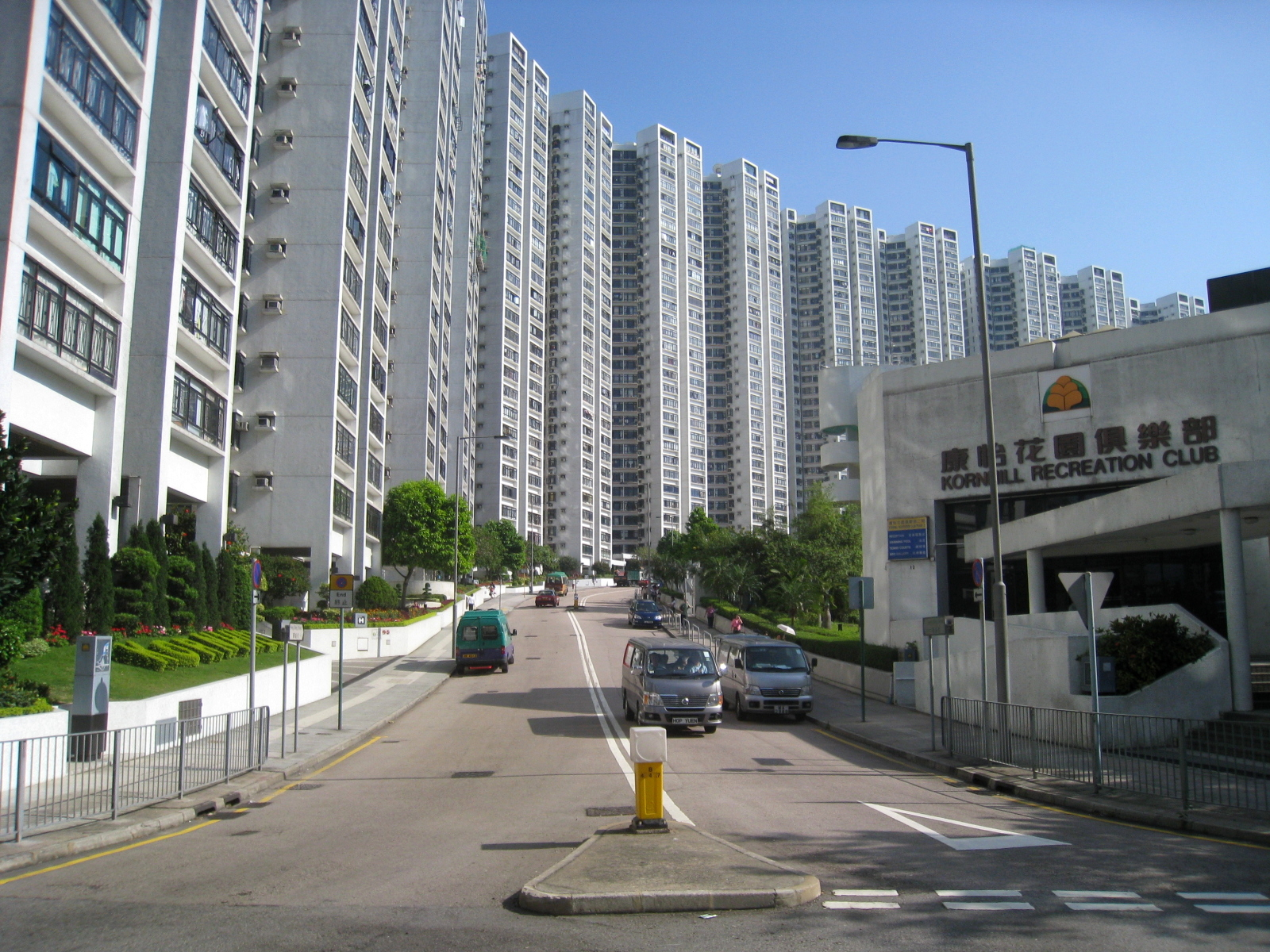
Kornhill apartment buildings.

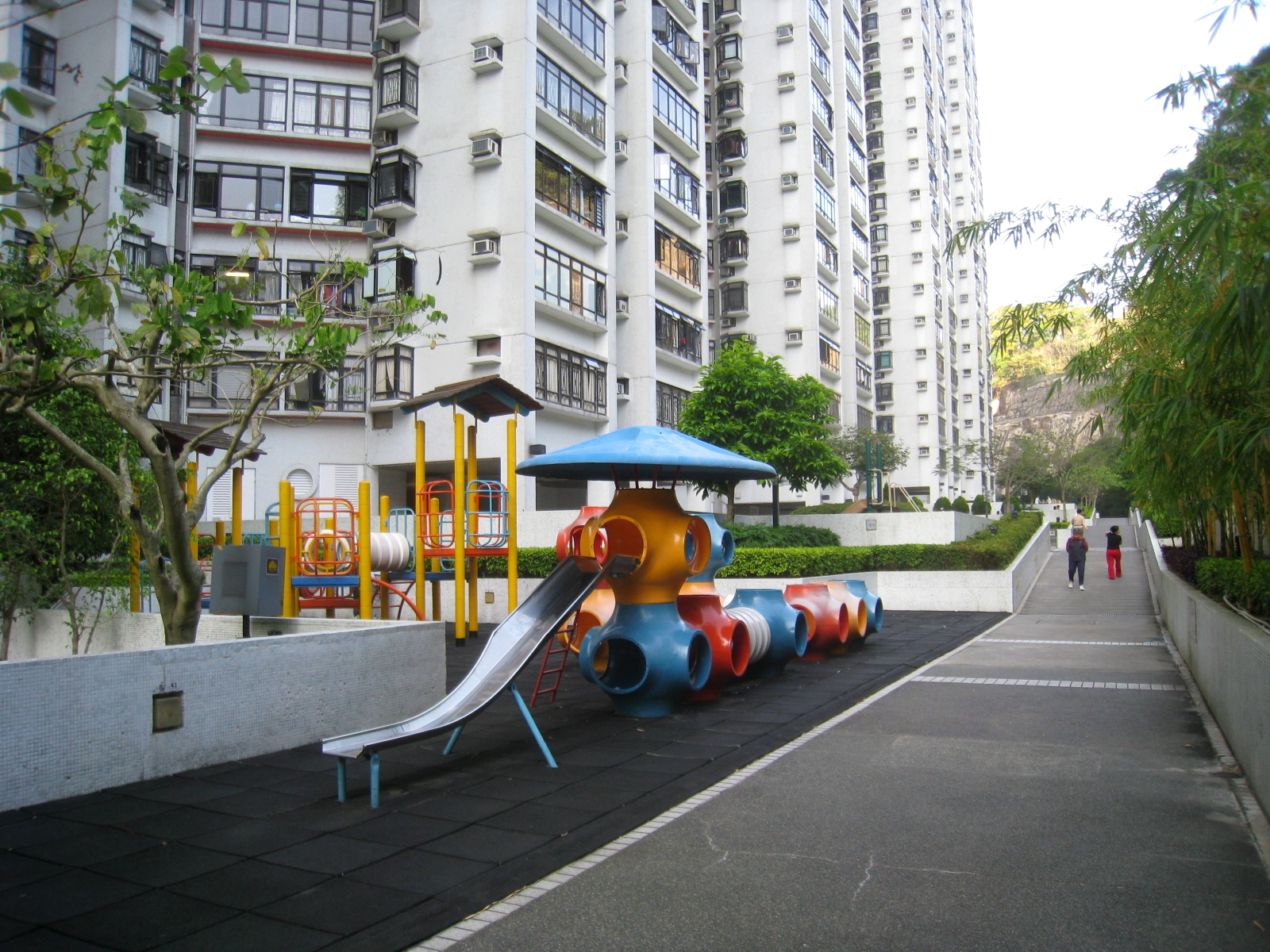
Children's playground

Kornhill and Kornhill Gardens are apartment buildings on the northern slope of Mount Parker, in Quarry Bay, Hong Kong Island, Hong Kong. Kornhill is a private housing estate and Kornhill Gardens is a Private Sector Participation Scheme estate. The total population is approximately 30,000.

== History ==
The name comes from a small hill within the area close to the foot of Mount Parker. Kornhill was the site of the company residence of the senior manager of the Taikoo Sugar Refinery and the first senior manager was Ferdinand Korn. The hill was almost levelled by the early 1980s, and can hardly be recognised. The modern-day housing estate was constructed in concert with the MTR Island line and opened by 1987.

== Modern development ==
There are a total 44 blocks, with heights ranging from 20 to 34 storeys, including 42 conventional residential buildings, one block of serviced apartments, and an office tower. The residential blocks in Kornhill are named after English letters and there are two blocks of each letter (i.e. A1, A2, D1, D2, P1, P2.) In Kornhill Gardens, the blocks are named in Arabic numbers from 1 to 10. Kornhill Gardens blocks are sold under the HOS Scheme.

Blocks A1 to H2 are on Hong Shing Street (康盛街). Blocks J1 to M2 are on Hong Yue Street (康愉街). Blocks N1 to R2 are on Hong On Street (康安街). There is no block I, O, and S to Z. Blocks 1 to 10 are on southern side (western bound) of King's Road.

=== Management ===
MTR Property is responsible for management.

=== Developers ===
They were developed by Hang Lung, New World Development, and MTR Property.

== Education ==
=== Primary schools ===
There are two primary schools:

- Shanghai Alumni Primary School (滬江小學)
- Buddhist Chung Wah Kornhill Primary School (佛教中華康山學校)

Kornhill is in Primary One Admission (POA) School Net 14. Within the school net are multiple aided schools (operated independently but funded with government money) and North Point Government Primary School.

=== Kindergartens and Nurseries ===
There are nine kindergartens:

- Magart International Kindergarten (瑪歌瑞特)
- Kornhill International Kindergarten (康怡國際幼稚園)
- Kornhill Japanese Kindergarten (康怡日本語幼稚園)
- Creativity (Kornhill Gardens) Child Care Centre (躍思(康山)幼稚園)
- Victoria Infant & Toddler Playland (維多利亞嬰幼樂園)
- Victoria (Kornhill) International Kindergarten (維多利亞(康怡)國際幼兒園)
- Victoria Kindergarten + Victoria International Nursery (維多利亞幼稚園,維多利亞國際幼兒園)

== Parks and recreation ==
Greeneries are all around the residential areas.

A clubhouse, in two phases (one near Block B and another near Block H) with two swimming pools, seven tennis courts, one squash court, a fitness gymnasium, and a barbecue site is available to club members only.

The Tai Tam (Quarry Bay Extension) Country Park is right next to Hong Shing Street.

== Transport ==
=== Public transport ===
- Kornhill is served by Tai Koo MTR station on the Island line.
- Tram stops and bus stops are available at Kornhill Road.
- Public bus service by Citybus and Kowloon Motor Bus (KMB serves only cross-harbour routes) at Kornhill Road and King's Road.
- Minibus service to North Point (33), Shau Kei Wan (32), and within Kornhill between Hong Shing Street and Tai Koo MTR station Hong On Street (33M), Mount Parker Lodge (32A), Cyberport & Aberdeen (69), Wan Chai and Kennedy Town (Red non-franchised minibuses)
- The Hong Shing Street, Hong On Street, and Hong Yue Street and the Kornhill side (southern side, west bound) of King's Road are restricted and not open to public buses to avoid nuisance to residents.

=== Major streets and roads ===
- Greig Road
- Hong Shing Street
- Hong Yue Street
- Hong On Street
- Kornhill Road
- King's Road
- Sai Wan Terrace
- An entrance to the west bound of Route 4, i.e. Island Eastern Corridor (IEC) and Route 2, i.e. the Eastern Harbour Crossing (EHC) is available at the junction of Hong Yue and Hong On streets.

== Politics ==
Kornhill has two constituencies within the Eastern District Council. Blocks A1 to M2, together with Sai Wan Terrace and The Floridian, are in the Kornhill (康怡) constituency. Blocks N1 to R2, and blocks 1 to 10 are in the Kornhill Gardens (康山) constituency.

The current district council members of Kornhill to the Eastern District Council are NGAI Chi Ho Derek and LEUNG Siu Sun Patrick.

In the Legislative Council elections, Kornhill belongs to the Hong Kong Island constituency.

== See also ==
- Taikoo Shing
- Nam Fung Sun Chuen
- List of Home Ownership Scheme Courts in Hong Kong
