= Monster Building =

Five buildings in Quarry Bay, Hong Kong

Coordinates: 22.284198°N 114.212300°E

- 怪獸大廈
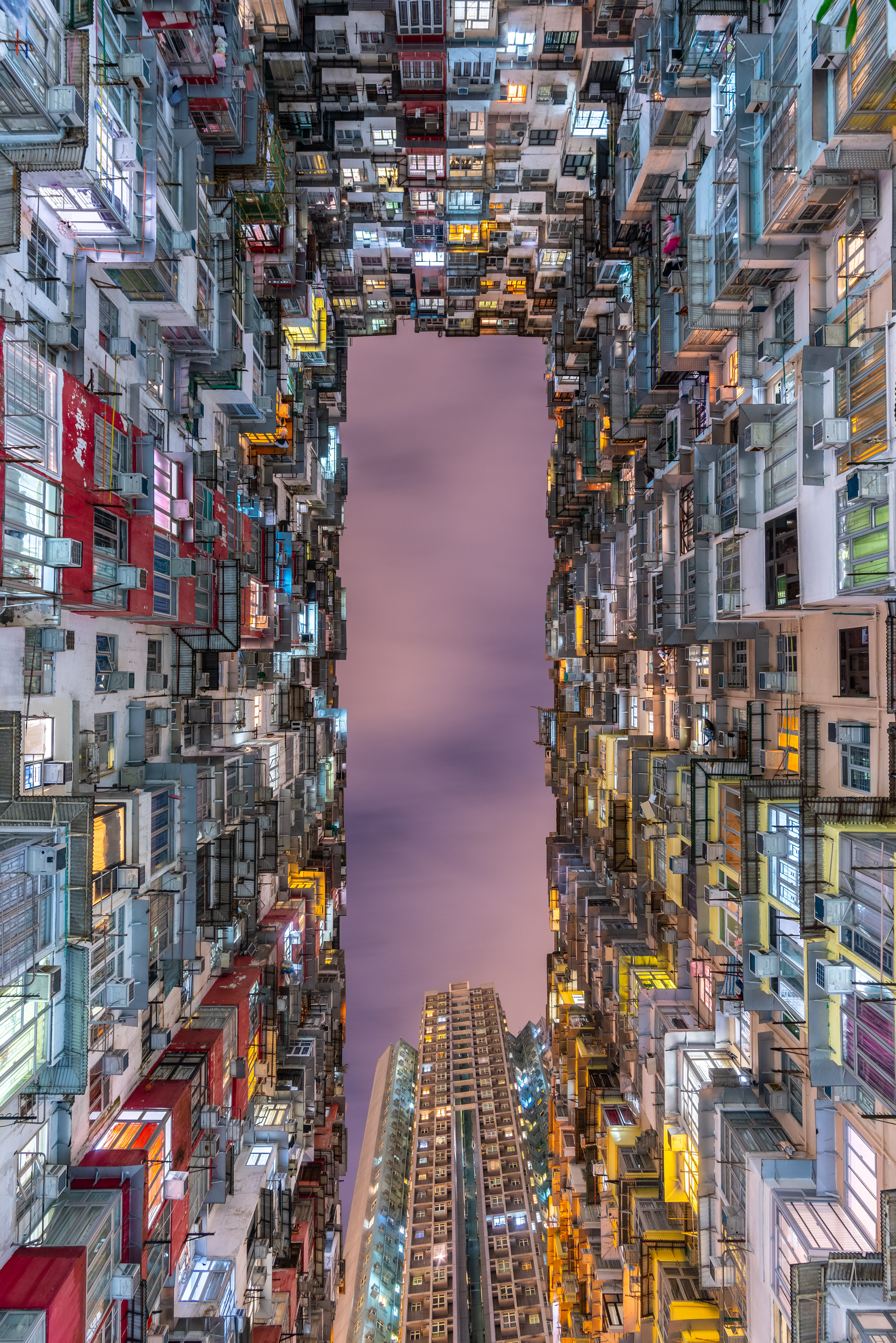
- An upward view
- Alternative names: Parker Estate

General information
- Location: King's Road, Quarry Bay, Hong Kong
- Completed: 1972
- Opened: 1972

Height
- Top floor: 18

Technical details
- Floor count: 18
- Floor area: 11.000 Square metres

Monster Building
- Traditional Chinese: 怪獸大廈
Transcriptions
Yue: Cantonese
- Yale Romanization: Gwaai sau daaih haah
- Jyutping: Gwaai3 sau3 daai6 haa6

The Monster Building is a group of five connected buildings on King's Road, Quarry Bay, Hong Kong. lts official name is Parker Estate, named after the neighbouring Mount Parker. It is a popular location for photography and has been used as inspiration for several filming locations. There are 2,243 units in five blocks with 18 floors in height. Currently, 10,000 people live in the complex.

== History and characteristics ==
The housing estate was originally built in the 1960s and named the Parker Estate, in reference to Mount Parker, south of the estate, and later sold. In 1972, the housing block was split into five blocks: the Fook Cheong Building, the Montane Mansion, the Oceanic Mansion, the Yick Cheong Building, and the Yick Fat Building. There are shops on the street front. The highest building is the Oceanic Mansion, with 18 floors.

== Popular culture ==
The location is a private estate which became popular with tourists and locals after a photograph of it by Romain Jacquet-Lagrèze was widely shared in 2013. The photograph of the housing estate was the cover of his photo book Vertical Horizon. The location became so popular that residents have placed signs asking visitors to be respectful. The structure has inspired locations in films including Transformers: Age of Extinction and Ghost in the Shell and music videos including "Labyrinth" by Mondo Grosso and Hikari Mitsushima and "Cave Me In" by Gallant and Eric Nam. The building has acquired the nickname "Monster Mansion".
