= Wembley International Kindergarten =

Wembley International Kindergarten is an English medium kindergarten located in the Taikoo Shing area of Hong Kong.

The Kindergarten was established in 1984 and has been led by a native British Principal since its inception. Children graduating from Wembley International Kindergarten often progress on to International Primary Schools.

== Curriculum ==
English medium education system with Key Phonetic approach. Children are exposed to practical life activities, art and craft to build teamwork, explorative music, dance and drama and story telling. Good manners, etiquette and mindfulness are encouraged. Wembley has a pat-a-pet programme introducing interaction with live animals. Outdoor activities take place to encourage self-confidence in speaking English. Interaction with the environment is encouraged to help develop responsible caring citizens of the future.

== Extra-curricular ==
Extra-curricular activities are on-going at Wembley International Kindergarten. Mandarin is offered, Interactive Drama in English and Cooking. A Summer Course takes place in July and August taught in English.

== Classes ==
Classes	Ages	Times (Mondays to Fridays)
Tots Playgroup	18 months to 2 years	08:55 to 10:25 and 10:30 to 12:00
Tots Playgroup	2 to 3 years	09:00 to 12:00 and 13:00 to 16:00
Kindergarten K1	3 to 4 years	09:00 to 12:00 and 13:00 to 16:00
Kindergarten K2	4 to 5 years	09:00 to 12:00 and 13:00 to 16:00
Kindergarten K3 (Equivalent to Primary 1)	5 to 6 years	09:00 to 12:00 and 13:00 to 16:00

== Uniform ==
All students much purchase a school uniform bearing the kindergarten logo.

Summer uniform: White T-shirt and blue shorts.

Winter uniform: Blue tracksuit with a white collar.

== Admission Procedure ==
Wembley accepts applicants from all backgrounds and all levels of English.

== Location ==
The Kindergarten is located at 2/F Tang Kung Mansion, 31 Taikoo Shing Road, Taikoo Shing, Hong Kong.

- "International Preschools". South China Morning Post.
