= Mount Parker Cable Car =

Cable car system in Hong Kong

- 柏架山吊車
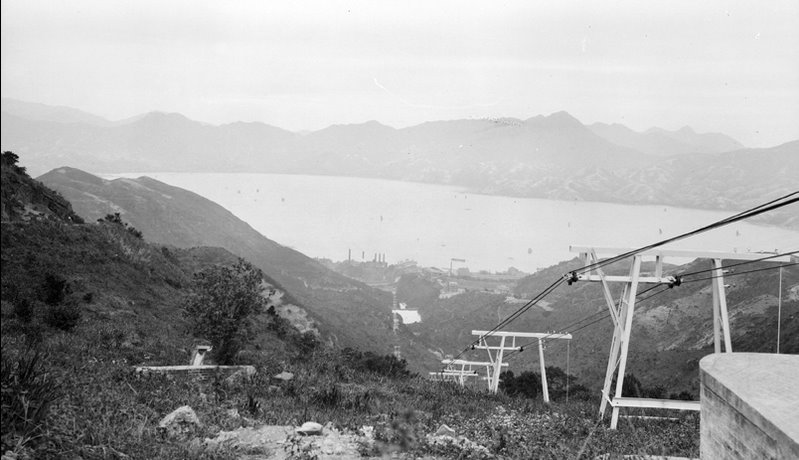
- Mount Parker Cable Car (c. 1919–1920, from Quarry Gap)

- Location within Hong Kong

Overview
- Status: Demolished
- Country: British Hong Kong
- Coordinates: 22.2668°N 114.2134°E (Quarry Gap terminus)
- Termini: King's Road, Quarry Bay; Quarry Gap, Mount Parker
- Elevation: lowest: 10 metres (33 ft) highest: 320 metres (1,050 ft)
- No. of stations: 2
- Open: 1892
- Closed: 1932

Operation
- Owner: Swire

Technical features
- Line length: 2.3 kilometres (1.4 mi)
Route map
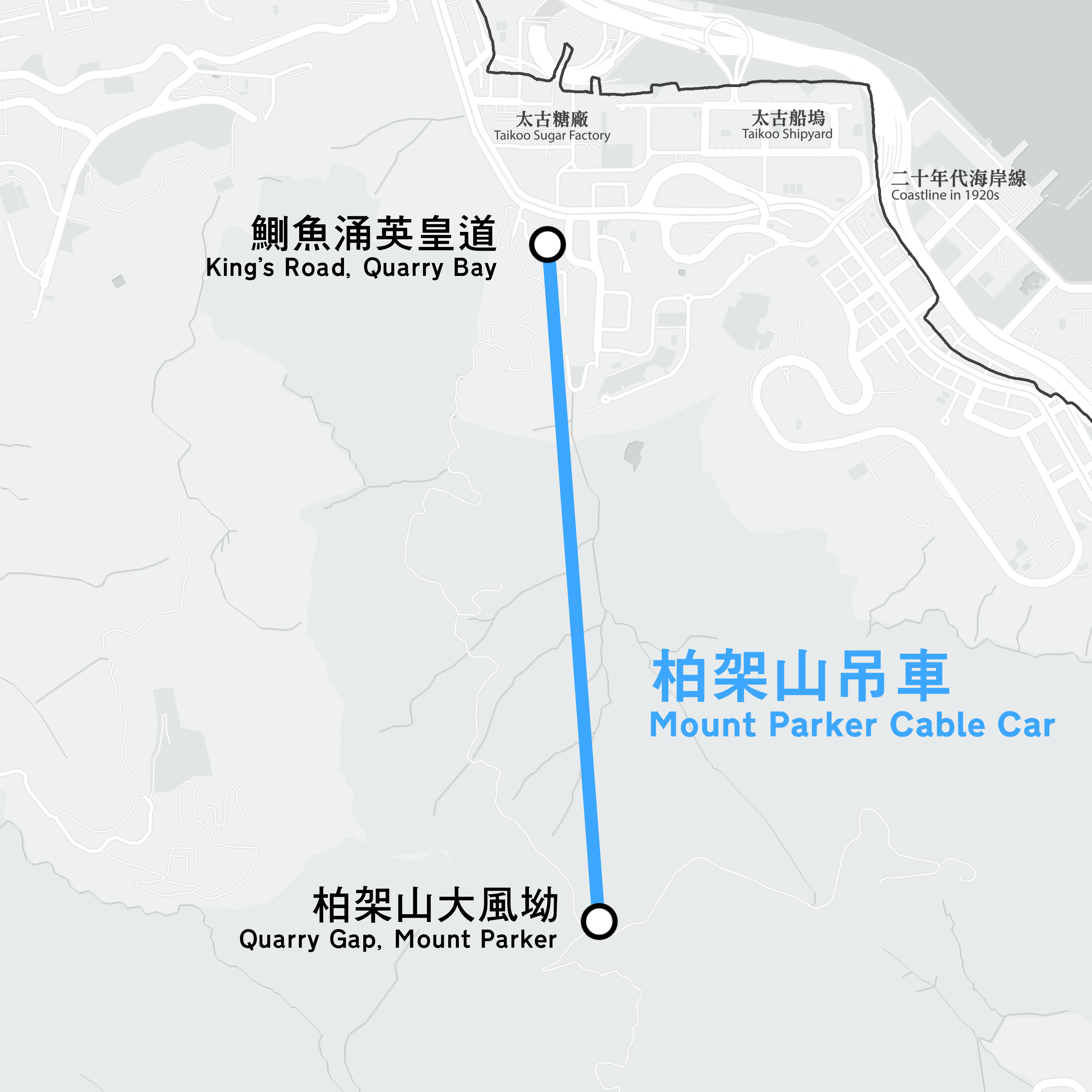

The Mount Parker Cable Car was an aerial tramway system in Hong Kong, connecting Quarry Gap (between Mount Parker and Mount Butler) and Quarry Bay near the present location of Yau Man Street.

The 2.3-kilometre-long (1.4 mi) cable car was built to provide a means of transport for employees of the Swire Group between the staff quarters uphill, and Taikoo Dockyard and Taikoo Sugar Refinery downhill. It operated between 1892 and 1932. The path of the cable car left by the stubs of the supporting concrete pillars is partially accessible and can be hiked in around 90 minutes.
