= Tai Tam Country Park (Quarry Bay Extension) =

Country park in Hong Kong

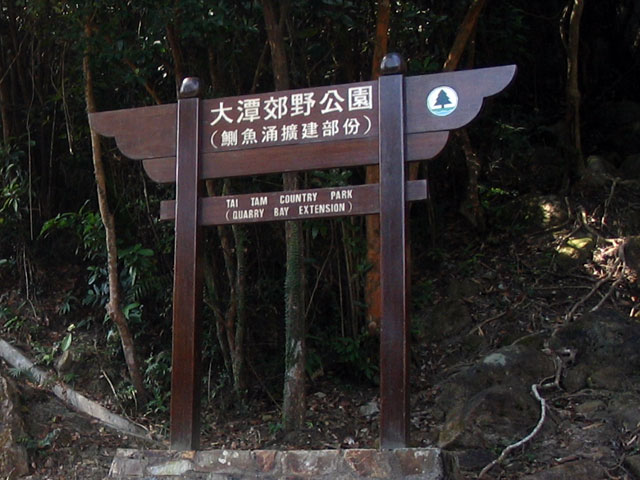
A sign in the country park — The name shown differs from the designation statutory instrument.

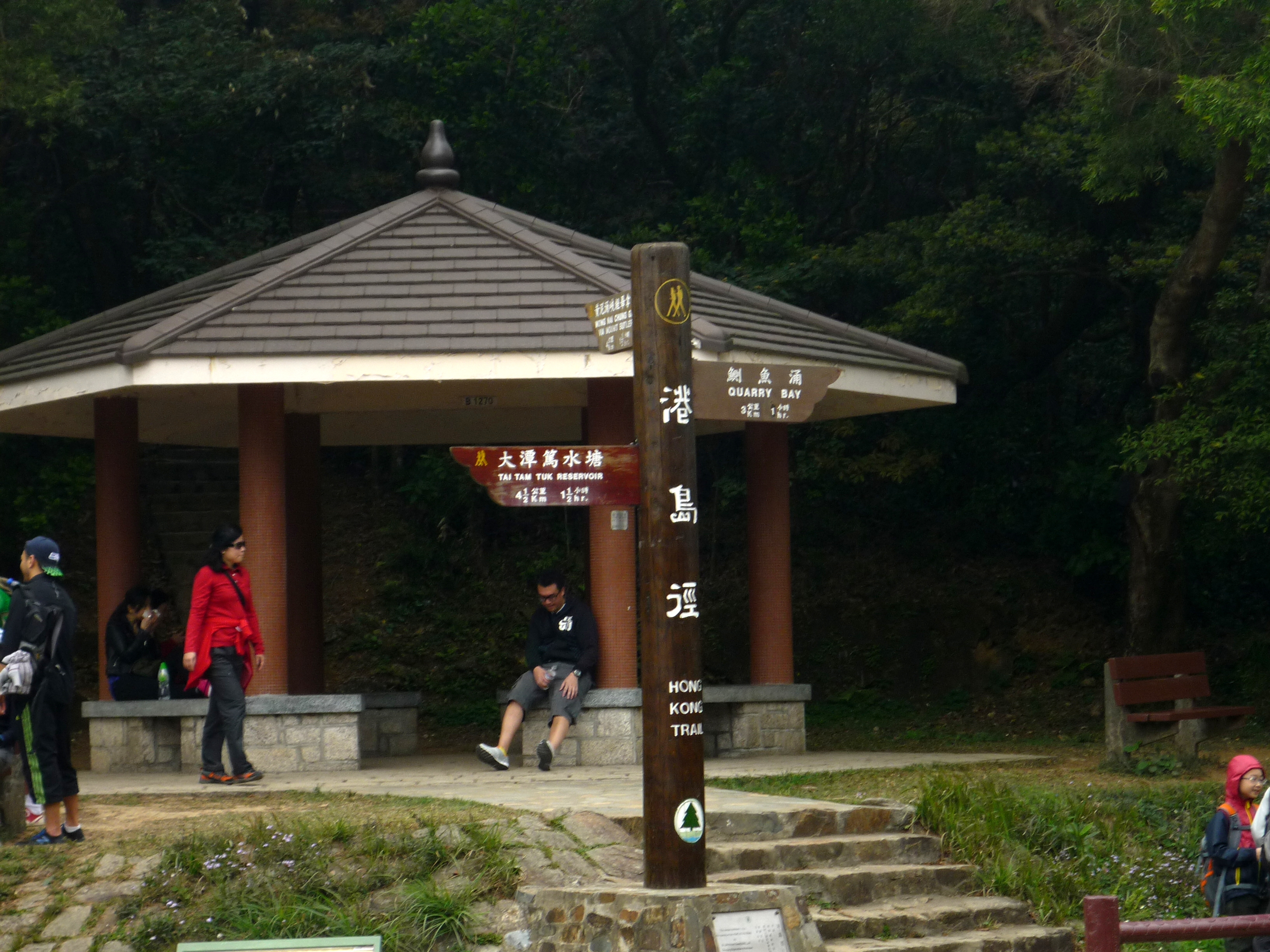
The roofed resting pavilion situated at Quarry Pass Pavillon (Hong Kong Trail Pillar in front). Behind are stairs (not visible) leading to the summit of Mount Butler.

Tai Tam (Quarry Bay Extension) Country Park (Chinese: 大潭（鰂魚涌擴建部份）郊野公園), also known simply as Quarry Bay Country Park (鰂魚涌郊野公園), on the eastern side of Hong Kong Island, is one of the twenty four statutory country parks in Hong Kong, and the twentieth to be so designated, in 1979.

The 270-hectare (670-acre) park is located near Quarry Bay. It covers Mount Parker, the second highest peak (531 metres (1,742 ft)) on Hong Kong Island and the highest in Island east, as well as Mount Butler and Siu Ma Shan. Sir Cecil's Ride goes through the park.

According to a Strategic Environmental Assessment (SEA) of the Environmental Protection Department the number of visitors in 1998-1999 was 701,400, second only to Aberdeen Country Park amongst country parks on Hong Kong Island.

== Features ==
A major feature of this country park is a site with dozens of wartime field stove, built in preparation for the Second World War.

Woodside, a red-brick house which currently houses a biodiversity education centre and was a residence for the Taikoo Sugar Refinery, is also located within this country park at 50 Mount Parker Road. Hong Park Country Trail, Quarry Bay Tree Walk and Quarry Bay Jogging Trail are located within the park.

=== Quarry Pass ===
Quarry Pass (大風坳), also known as the Quarry Gap or Tai Fung Au, is a col situated 300 m (980 ft) above sea level in the park. The Quarry Pass Pavillon marks the starting point of Hong Kong Trail Section 6, with a commemorating plaque for the opening of the Hong Kong Trail placed nearby. A wooden pillar is placed at the Pavillon to indicate the starting point, with three direction signage plates mounted on the pillar.

The Quarry Bay Pass Pavilion (Chinese: 大風坳涼亭) is an intersection point that connects trails to Mount Butler, Mount Parker, Tai Tam Reserviors and Tai Tam Country Park Entrance (through Mount Parker Road). There is also an unpaved hiking trail to reach the Quarry Pass, via the Mount Parker Cable Car's Ruin Trail.

With 5 trails linked to the intersection point, the pavilion area is equipped with a public toilet, basic outdoor gym and recreational facilities, a picnic area, outdoor stone BBQ stoves and a roofed resting pavilon. A set of stairs located behind the roofed resting pavilion allows a direct climb to the summit of Mount Butler. The Mount Parker Viewing Point, a scenery viewing site, is situated within the Quarry Pass.

== See also ==
- Hong Kong Trail
- Wilson Trail
- Mount Parker Cable Car
