= Quarry Bay =

Area in Hong Kong

Coordinates: 22.28313°N 114.21279°E

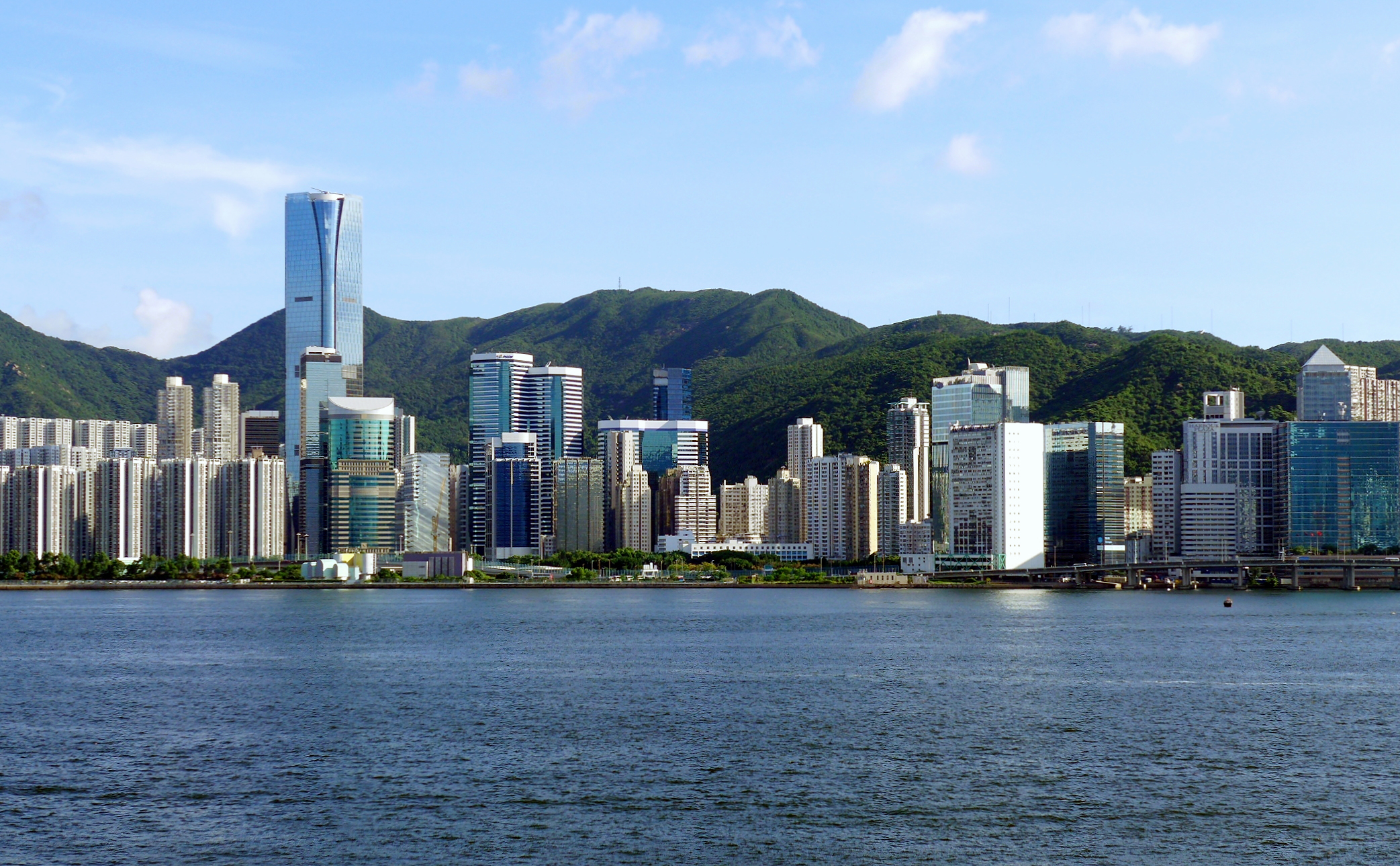
- Traditional Chinese: 鰂魚涌
- Simplified Chinese: 鲗鱼涌
- Cantonese Yale: jāk yùh chūng
- Jyutping: zak^{1} jyu^{4} cung^{1}
- Literal meaning: "crucian carp stream"
Transcriptions
Standard Mandarin
- Hanyu Pinyin: Zéiyúchōng
Yue: Cantonese
- Yale Romanization: jāk yùh chūng
- Jyutping: zak^{1} jyu^{4} cung^{1}
- IPA: [tsɐk̚˥ jy˩ tsʰʊŋ˥]

Alternative Chinese name
- Traditional Chinese: 採石灣
- Simplified Chinese: 采石湾
- Cantonese Yale: chói sehk wāan
- Jyutping: coi^{2} sek^{6} waan^{1}
- Literal meaning: rock-extracting bay
Transcriptions
Standard Mandarin
- Hanyu Pinyin: cǎi shí wān
Yue: Cantonese
- Yale Romanization: chói sehk wāan
- Jyutping: coi^{2} sek^{6} waan^{1}

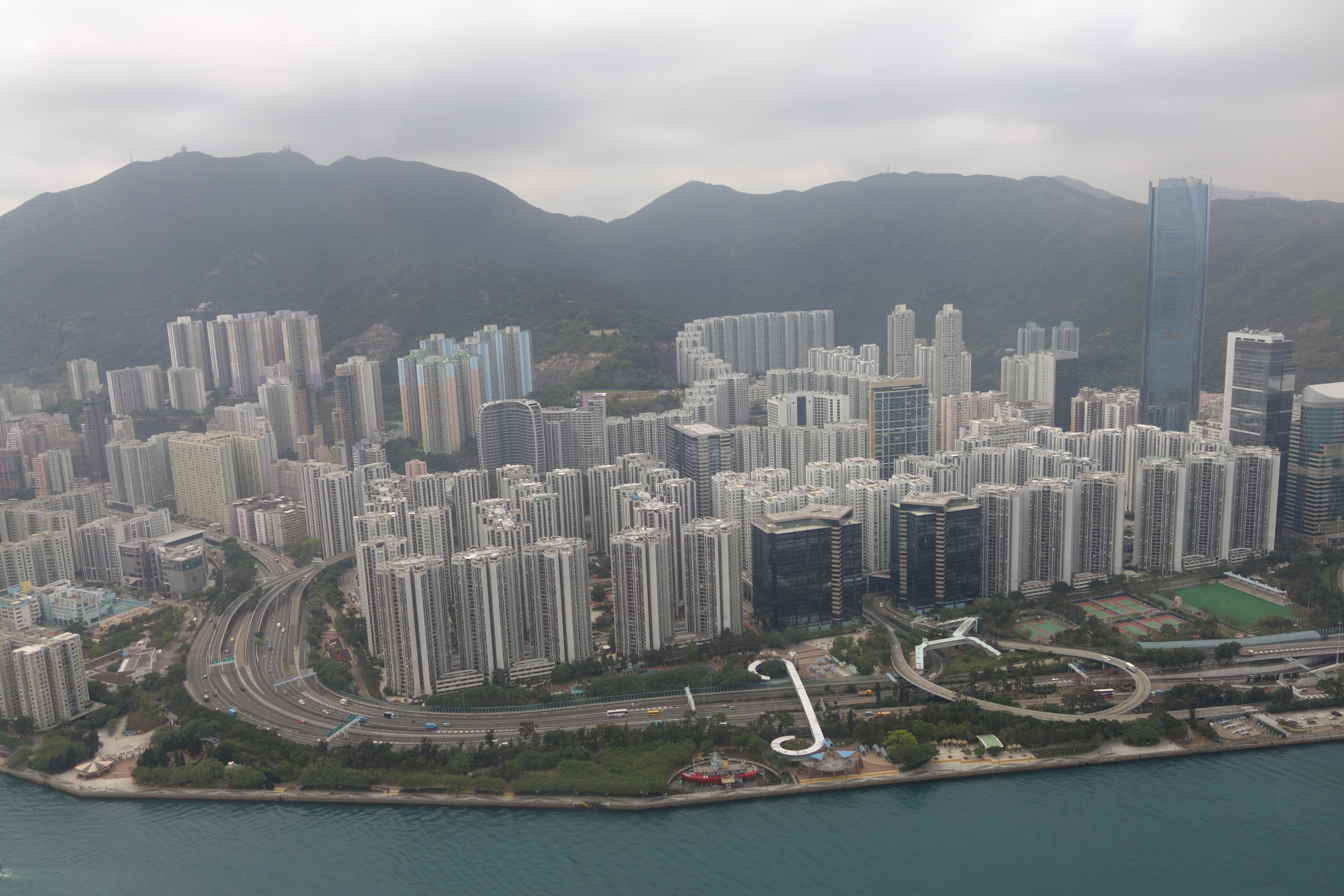
Aerial view of Taikoo Shing in Quarry Bay, One Island East is the tallest building in the photo and Mount Parker is in the background.

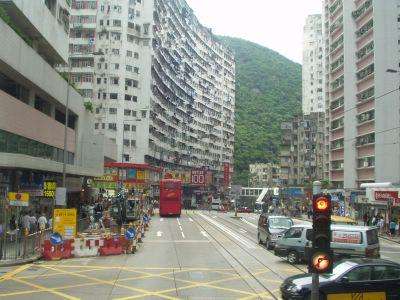
A section of King's Road in Quarry Bay

Quarry Bay is an area beneath Mount Parker in the Eastern District of Hong Kong Island, in Hong Kong. Quarry Bay is bordered by Sai Wan Ho to the east, Mount Parker to the south, North Point to the west, and Victoria Harbour to the north.

Quarry Bay is a residential and business district in Hong Kong. One Island East, the seventh tallest building in Hong Kong, is located in Quarry Bay. Some government departments such as the Accounting and Financial Reporting Council have relocated their offices from Central and Wan Chai to Quarry Bay over the years, and some multinational companies have their offices located in the district, such as Ernst & Young, BNP Paribas, LVMH and Boston Consulting Group, etc. Cityplaza and Kornhill Plaza, being one of the largest shopping malls on Hong Kong Island is at Quarry Bay.

With dense population as well as developed economic and commercial activities in the district, Quarry Bay has a considerable traffic demand. It is one of the transportation hubs in Hong Kong. There are two MTR stations in the district, being Quarry Bay Station and Taikoo Station. Quarry Bay Station is the intersection of the Island line and Tseung Kwan O line. Other transportation means in the district include buses, minibuses, and trams.

== History ==
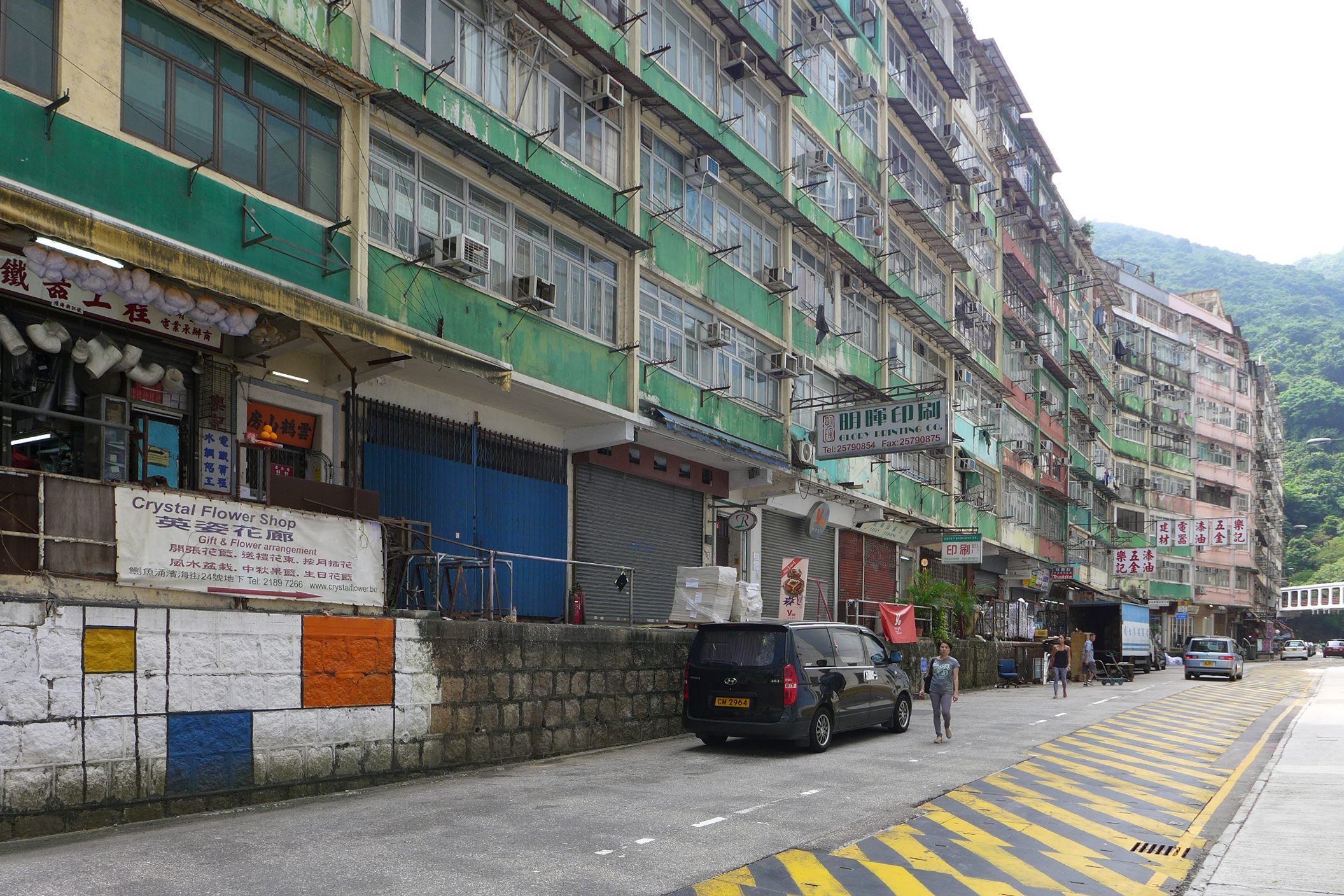
The steps in Pan Hoi Street

The 1819 edition of the Gazetteer of Sun On County (嘉慶版新安縣志) did not mention today's Quarry Bay. Historians such as Anthony Kwok Kin Siu suggested Quarry Bay was a remote area before British colonial time.

During colonial Hong Kong times, the Hakka stonemasons settled in the area after the British arrival.

This area was a bay where rock from the hillsides were quarried and transported by ship for building construction or road building. The Chinese name Tsak Yue Chung (鰂魚涌) reveals that it was a small stream where crucian carp (鰂魚) could be found in the 19th century. The English name was Arrow Fish Creek. The original bay has disappeared since land reclamation has taken place, and was about 700 m (770 yd) from the current coastline.

=== Taikoo ===
The eastern part of Quarry Bay, namely Quarry Point, was largely owned by Swire and therefore many places and facilities are named after the company's Chinese name, Taikoo. The river originally flowed into the bay, however it was shut off from the sea with the construction of the Tai Koo Reservoir to supply fresh water to the Taikoo Dockyard, the Taikoo Sugar factory at Tong Chong Street (糖廠街), and later the Swire Coca-Cola factory at Greig Road (基利路) and Yau Man Street (佑民街). The upper course of the river was converted into a cement-paved catchwater, and the lower course is the present-day Quarry Bay Street (鰂魚涌街), with the original estuary near the Quarry Bay Street – King's Road junction.

In the mid-1980s, the hillside was converted into Kornhill apartment buildings, the reservoir into Mount Parker Lodge (康景花園) apartment buildings, and the Dockyard into Taikoo Shing. The Coca-Cola factory is now apartment Kornville (康蕙花園), and Taikoo Sugar is now the Taikoo Place, a commercial hub.

=== Lai Chi ===
The western end of Quarry Bay was historically part of North Point; during the 1930s its beaches became one of the most popular places for holding swimming galas in Hong Kong. From this basis an upmarket entertainment complex, the Ritz Nightclub (麗池夜總會), was built in the area in 1947. The nightclub was demolished a few years later to make way for the construction of apartment buildings during the latter half of the 1950s. Nonetheless, for years afterwards, the western part of Quarry Bay continued to be known informally as Lai Chi (麗池), made more so by the name being homophone to Cantonese for "late as usual" (例遲) – a reference to King's Road, until 1984 the only thoroughfare in the area and thus infamous for traffic congestion.

To this day, some buildings in the western part of Quarry Bay are named as "North Point something building", although they are across the modern-day limit of North Point at Man Hong Street / Healthy Street West.

== Location ==
Quarry Bay is considered as an area surrounded by Kornhill Road to the east, Hong Shing Street and Mount Parker Road to the south, junction of King's Road and Healthy Street West to the west, and Taikoo Wan Road to the north.

== Commercial buildings ==
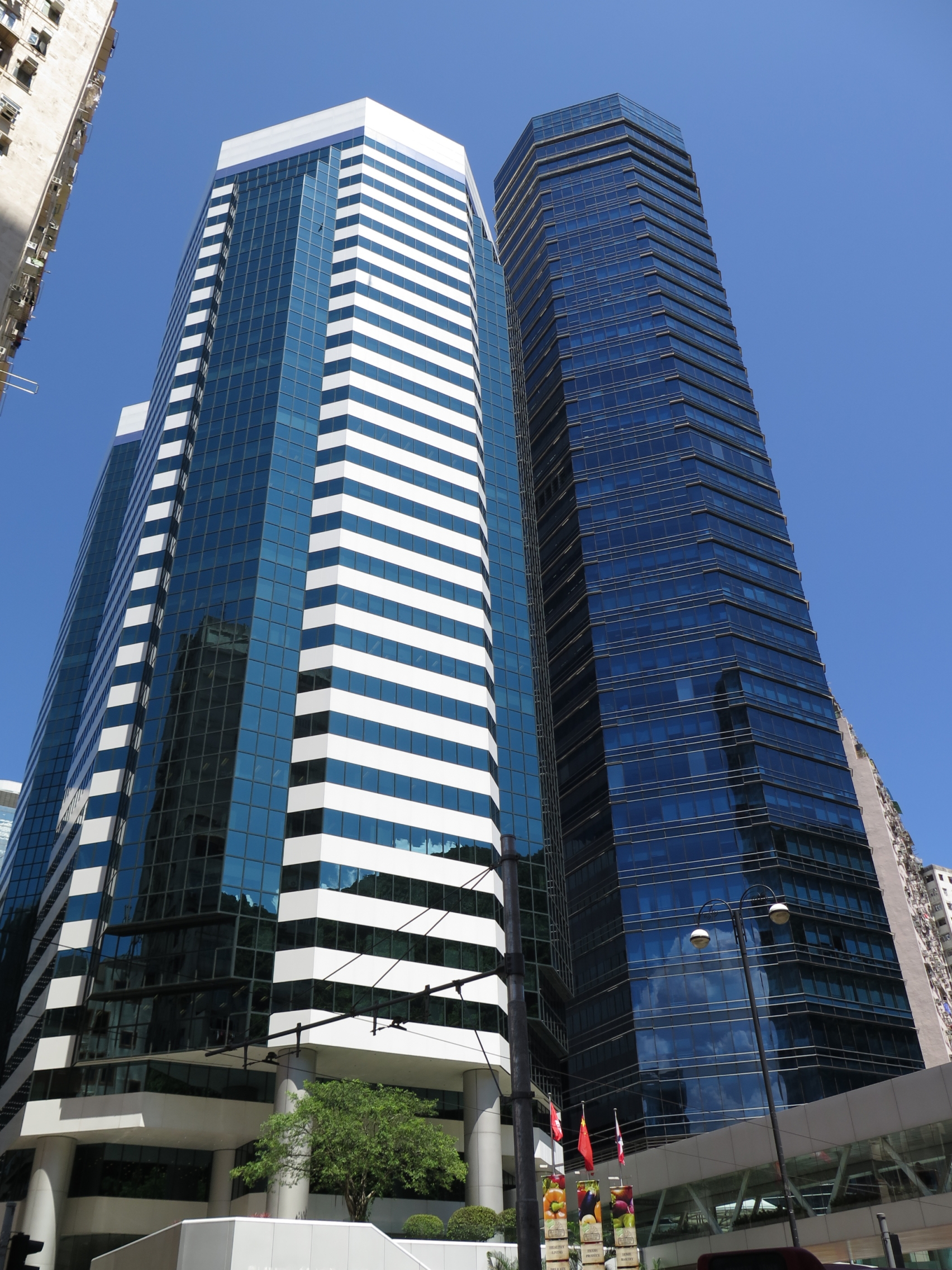
Entrance of Taikoo Place along Sugar House Street

- Taikoo Place: One of the business districts in Hong Kong. Commercial buildings include: One Island East, Devon House, Dorset House, Cambridge House, Lincoln House, Oxford House, Westlands Centre, Berkshire House, One Taikoo Place and Two Taikoo Place. Tenants include Ernst & Young, BNP Paribas, Royal Bank of Canada, LVMH, Boston Consulting Group, Freshfields, Accenture etc.
- Cityplaza: It includes 1111 King's Road, 12 Taikoo Bay Road, and 14 Taikoo Bay Road. Tenants include Deloitte, Thomson Reuters, American Express, FWD Group etc.
- AIA Hong Kong Tower
- K11 ATELIER King's Road
- 625 King's Road
- Chinachem Exchange Square

Also, a few industrial buildings exist in the areas of Shipyard Lane.

Former

- Fresh Produce Market
- Gala I, Gala II cinemas
- Mount Parker House, Parkes Commercial Centre

== Residential buildings ==
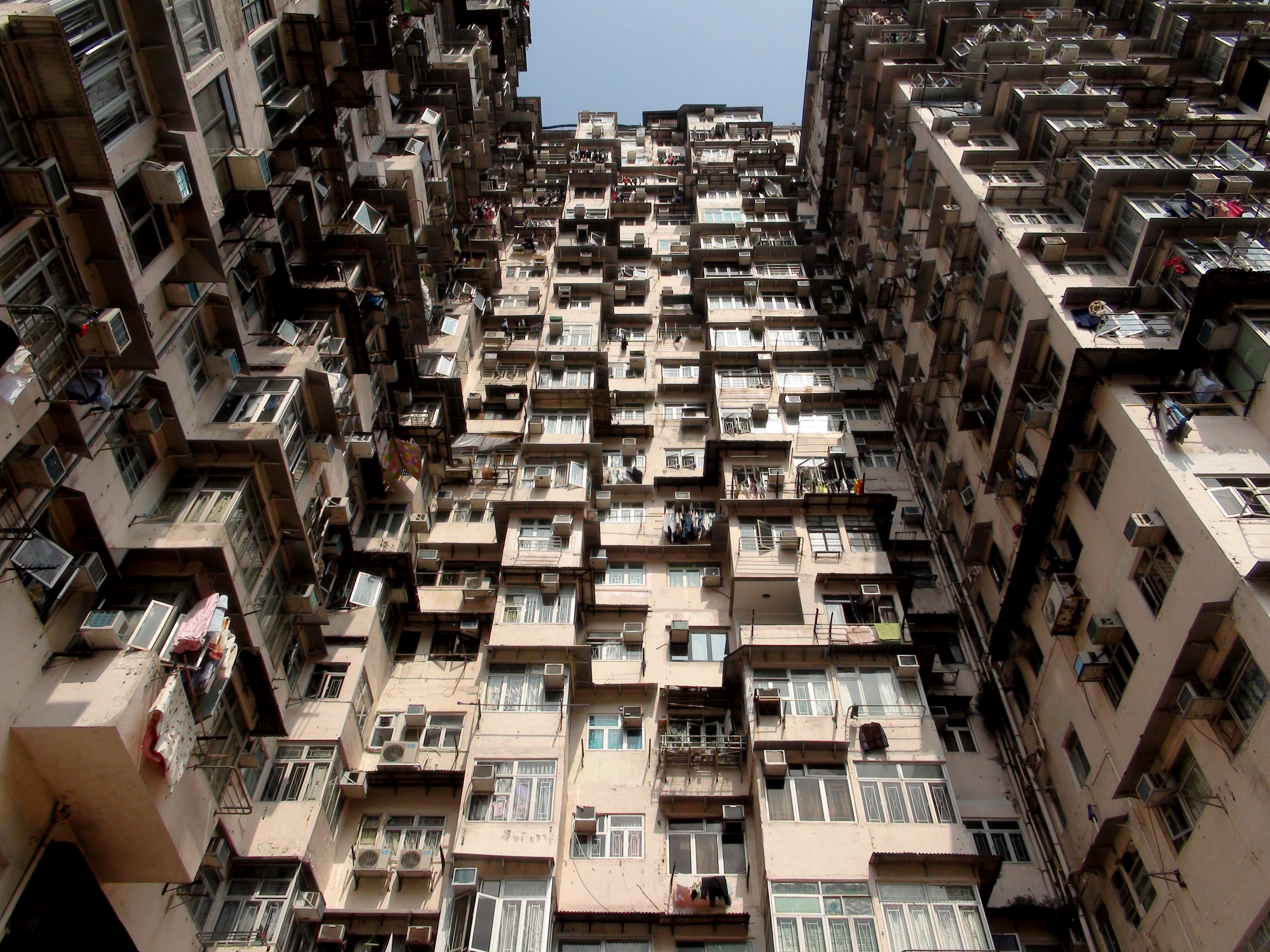
The "Monster Building" consists of five connecting buildings of Fook Cheong Building, Montane Mansion, Oceanic Mansion, Yick Cheong Building and Yick Fat Building.

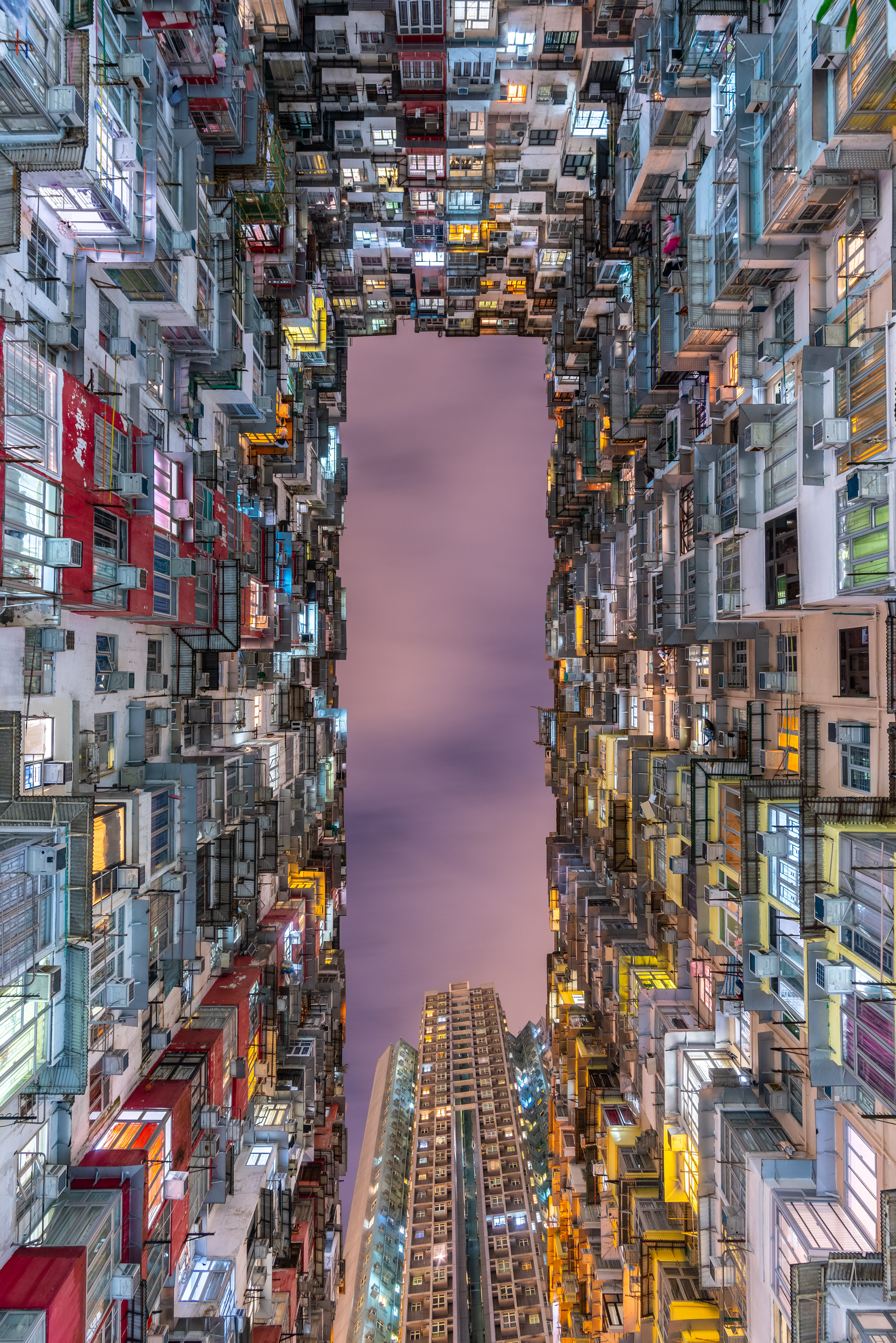
The Yick Cheong Building

- Bedford Gardens
- CASA 880
- Dragon View House
- Granview Court
- The Floridian
- Healthy Village Estate
- Kings View Court
- Kornhill, and Kornhill Gardens
- Model Housing Estate
- "Monster Building" – Fook Cheong Building, Montane Mansion, Oceanic Mansion, Yick Cheong Building and Yick Fat Building
- Mount Parker Residences
- Nan Fung Sun Chuen
- Mount Parker Lodge
- Novum East
- Oceanic Building
- The Orchards
- Park Vale
- Ritz Garden Apartments
- Riviera Mansion
- Royal Terrace
- Snowboat Mansion
- Splendid Place
- Sunway Gardens
- Taikoo Shing
- Wah Shun Garden
- Westlands Court
- Westlands Garden

=== Nan Fung Sun Chuen ===
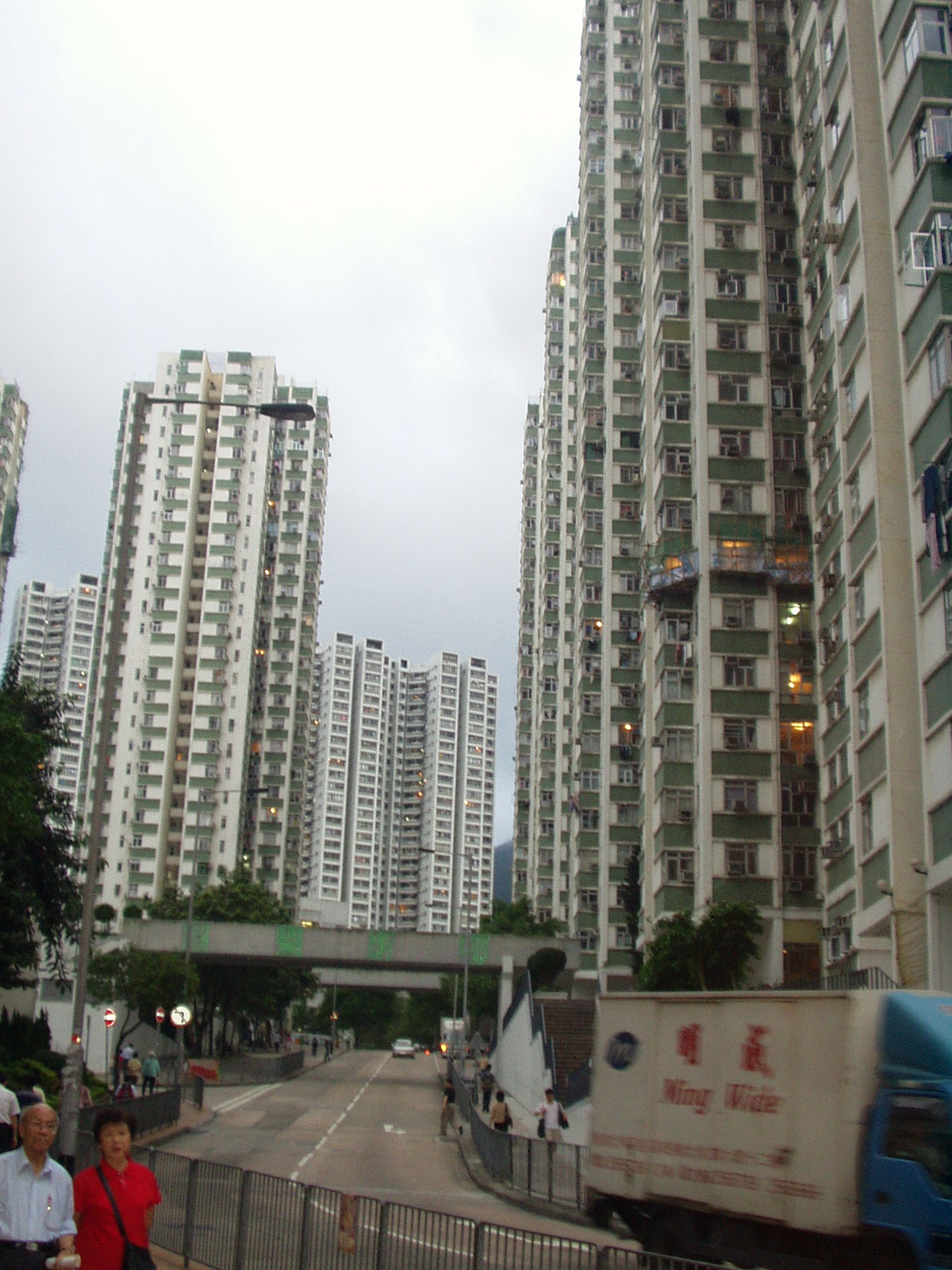
Nan Fung Sun Chuen, a private housing estate in Quarry Bay

Nan Fung Sun Chuen (南豐新邨), built in 1978, is a private apartment estate. Consisting of 2,827 apartment units in 12 buildings distributed along Greig Road and Greig Crescent with a car park at the centre of the development, it was developed by Nan Fung Development. Because of the relatively large size of the development, it serves as the benchmark for premises developed in the late 1970s in the property market. The tower blocks range in height from 28 to 33 floors. Blocks 1 to 5 are at 32 to 40 (even numbers) Greig Road while blocks 6 to 12 are at 27 to 15 Greig Crescent.

=== Taikoo Shing ===
Taikoo Shing is a private residential development in Quarry Bay. Consisting of 61 mansions distributed along Taikoo Wan Road & Taikoo Shing Road, it was developed by Swire.

== Tourism ==
=== Fireboat Alexander Grantham Exhibition Gallery ===
The Alexander Grantham was a fireboat of Hong Kong's Fire Services Department. The fireboat was named after former Governor Sir Alexander Grantham. The boat has since retired from service and been replaced by other vessels.

On 10 March 2006, the fireboat was successfully hoisted into its new permanent home in the Central Concourse of Quarry Bay Park, Hong Kong, where it has been converted into the Fireboat Alexander Grantham Exhibition Gallery and was opened to the public as a museum in 2007. In addition to the fireboat itself, the Gallery houses a number of multimedia exhibits on the vessel's history and on firefighting in Hong Kong.

=== "Monster Building" complex ===
"Monster Building" is a condominium complex of five interconnected buildings. The complex consists of Fook Cheong Building, Montane Mansion, Oceanic Mansion, Yick Cheong Building, and Yick Fat Building.

=== Woodside Biodiversity Education Centre ===
Woodside Biodiversity Education Centre situated at Mount Parker Road, Quarry Bay. The centre comprises three themed exhibition galleries introducing Hong Kong's precious natural resources and biodiversity. The centre aims to foster public awareness, knowledge and understanding the inherent value of Hong Kong's biodiversity assets and to marshal public support and action for nature conservation.

== Government ==
The head office of the Securities and Futures Commission is in One Island East in Quarry Bay.

== Parks and recreational facilities ==
- Quarry Bay Park
- Quarry Bay Municipal Services Building – with indoor playground and a public library managed by LSCD
- Greig Road Sitting-out Area
- Tai Tam Country Park (Quarry Bay Extension)

== Education ==
Quarry Bay is in Primary One Admission (POA) School Net 14. Within the school net are multiple aided schools (operated independently but funded with government money) and North Point Government Primary School.

Kindergartens & Nurseries

- ABC Pathways International Kindergarten (Tai Koo Campus)
- Creativity (Park Vale) Kindergarten
- Epoch Anglo-Chinese Kindergarten
- Hamilton Hill International Kindergarten
- MAGART International Kindergarten
- Saint Anna Anglo-Chinese Kindergarten
- Victoria (Kornhill) Kindergarten
- Victoria (Kornhill) Nursery

Primary schools

- Buddhist Chung Wah Kornhill Primary School
- Canossa School (Hong Kong)
- Chinese Methodist School North Point
- Delia School of Canada
- North Point Government Primary School
- Shanghai Alumni Primary School
- Tai Koo Primary School

Secondary schools

- Canossa College
- Delia School of Canada

Hong Kong Public Libraries operates the Quarry Bay Public Library in the Quarry Bay Municipal Services Building.

== Transport ==
=== Public transport ===
- MTR
  - MTR Quarry Bay station: Tseung Kwan O line and Island line
  - MTR Tai Koo station: Island line
- Trams
- Citybus
- KMB (serves only cross-harbour routes)
- Minibuses
  - to Kornhill, Cyberport, North Point, Shau Kei Wan, Kennedy Town, etc.
  - includes 32, 32A, 33 etc.

=== Major thoroughfares, roads and streets ===
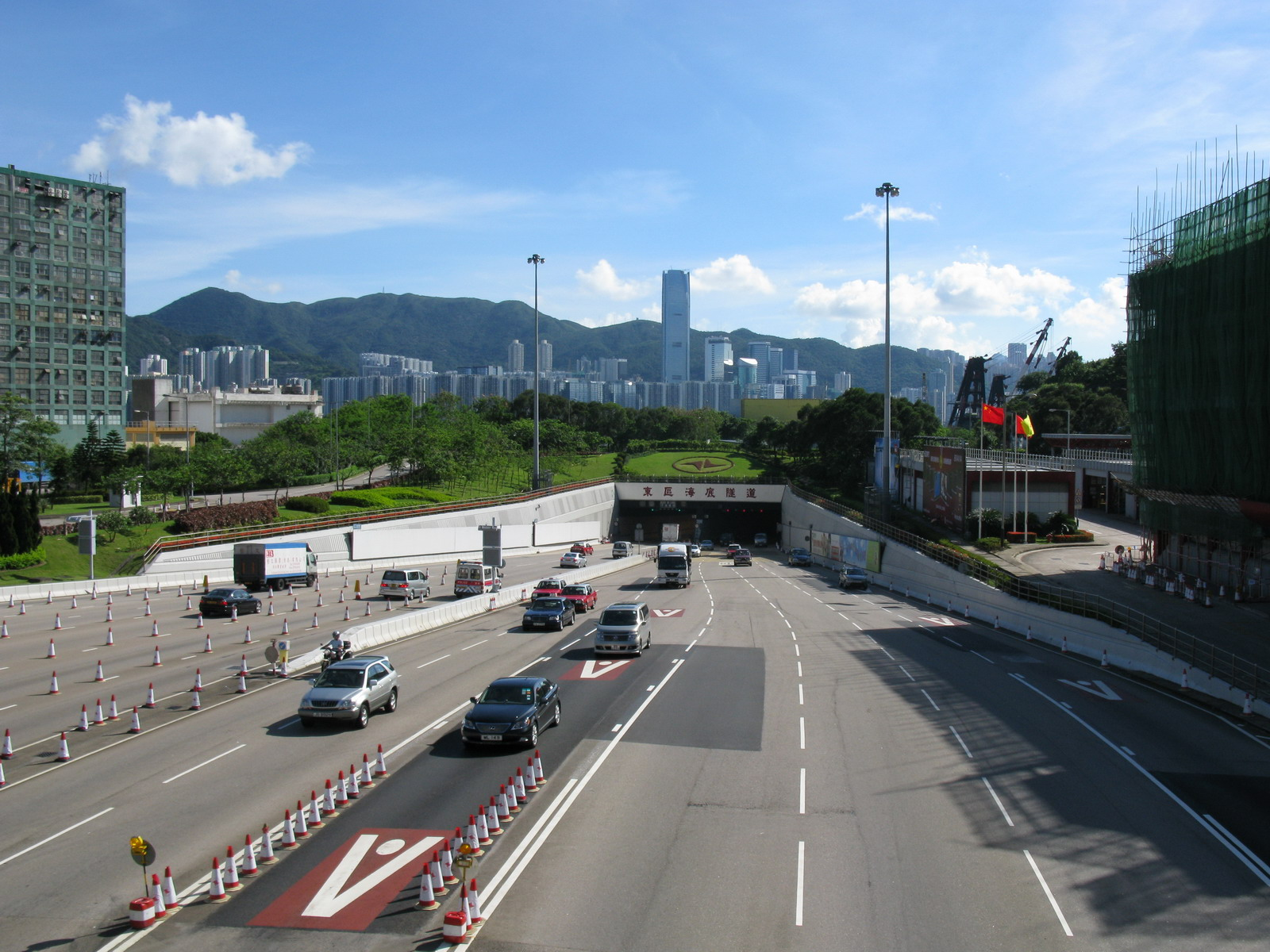
The Eastern harbour tunnel takes people to Kowloon

- Island Eastern Corridor
- Eastern Harbour Crossing
- Finnie Street
- Greig Road
- Java Road
- King's Road
- Kornhill Road
- Mansion Lane
- Model Lane
- Mount Parker Road
- Quarry Bay Street
- Sai Wan Terrace
- Shipyard Lane
- Taikoo Shing Road
- Taikoo Wan Road
- Tsat Tsz Mui Road
- Tong Chong Street
- Westlands Road

== Hiking ==
Quarry Bay is home to multiple hiking trails, including the Mount Parker Road Green Trail and the Hong Pak Country Trail, which connects further to nearby trails.

=== Facilities ===
The Woodside Biodiversity Education Center (also known as the Red House) is a biodiversity centre housing local animal species and displays of educational resources on Hong Kong wildlife. The centre is situated on Mount Parker Road, with benches available nearby for picnics.

Wartime remains including the Wartime Stoves and Anti-Air-Raid Caves are preserved throughout Mount Parker Road Green Trail and the Hong Pak Country Trail.

Hikes throughout Quarry Bay are often packed with resting benches, washrooms, pavilions, mappings as well as trash bins.

=== Mountains ===
Mount Butler, Mount Parker and Siu Ma Shan are mountains available for hiking. These mountains are linked towards more hiking options such as the Jardine's Lookout or approach for Tai Tam Reservoirs.

=== Nearby areas ===
Stanley can be reached from Tai Tam Reservoirs via Violet Hill and The Twins. Shek O Country Park is also reachable from Tai Tam Reservoirs, which offer more hiking options.

Tai Tam Reservoirs is situated near the Wong Lai Chung Reservoir Park.

== See also ==
- Conservation in Hong Kong
- Taikoo Shing
- Category:Rivers of Hong Kong
