= Nord Anglia International School Hong Kong =

International school in Hong Kong

Coordinates: 22.3141°N 114.2270°E

Nord Anglia intonational school Hong Kong
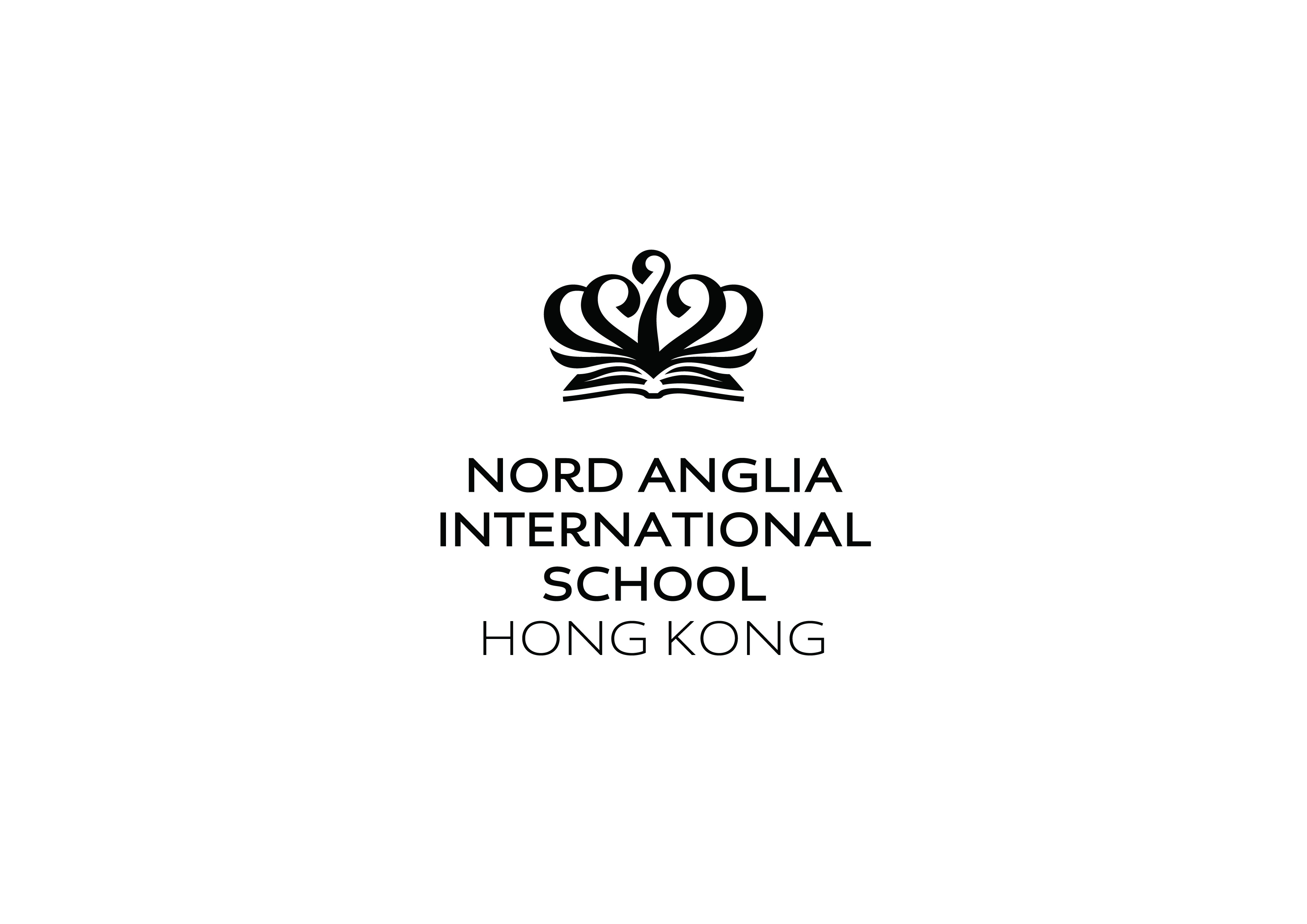

Location
- 11 On Tin Street, Lam Tin, Kowloon (Primary); 19 Yuet Wah Street, Kwun Tong, Kowloon (Secondary); Hong Kong

Information
- School type: International School
- Established: 1 September 2014; 12 years ago
- Principal: Mr Tim Richardson
- Age: 3 yrs to 18 yrs
- Enrollment: Maximum Capacity 2000
- Website: Nord Anglia International School Hong Kong

Nord Anglia International School Hong Kong
- Traditional Chinese: 香港諾德安達國際學校
- Simplified Chinese: 香港诺德安达国际学校
Transcriptions
Standard Mandarin
- Hanyu Pinyin: Xiānggǎng Nuòdé Āndá Guójì Xuéxiào
Yue: Cantonese
- Jyutping: hoeng1 gong2 nok6 dak1 ngon1 daat6 gwok3 zai3 hok6 haau6

Nord Anglia International School Hong Kong (Chinese: 香港諾德安達國際學校) is an international school in Hong Kong. The international school opened in September 2014. As of 2025, it is headed by Mr. Tim Richardson. The school's curriculum consists of the International Baccalaureate, English National Curriculum and IGCSE.

== History ==
By March 2014, over 500 students applied to attend the school and over 1,000 people of various nationalities applied for teaching positions.

Circa 2016, the school had plans to charge a $20,000 HKD fee per student per month, but plans were shelved after they protested during a meeting. As of 2017, the school had plans to open a new campus at the Tin Wan Shopping Centre, but it received opposition from area politicians.

In 2021, the school announced its new secondary campus located in Kwun Tong (formerly the campus of Delia School of Canada (East Kowloon)). With government approval, the school opened for the 2021–22 academic year and will progress to future academic years.

== Campuses ==
There are three Nord Anglia campuses in Hong Kong.

- Lam Tin, Kowloon (formerly Sing Yin Secondary School campus), which serves students from ages 6 through to 11 years of age.
- Sai Kung Town, New Territories, which serves students for Pre-School
- Kwun Tong, Kowloon (formerly the campus of DSC International School (East Kowloon)), which serves secondary students.

== Facilities ==
Throughout free periods, students from all year groups may access an array of facilities which include the cafeteria, sports hall and a library.

A swimming pool has been open for students to use during Lessons and ECA.
