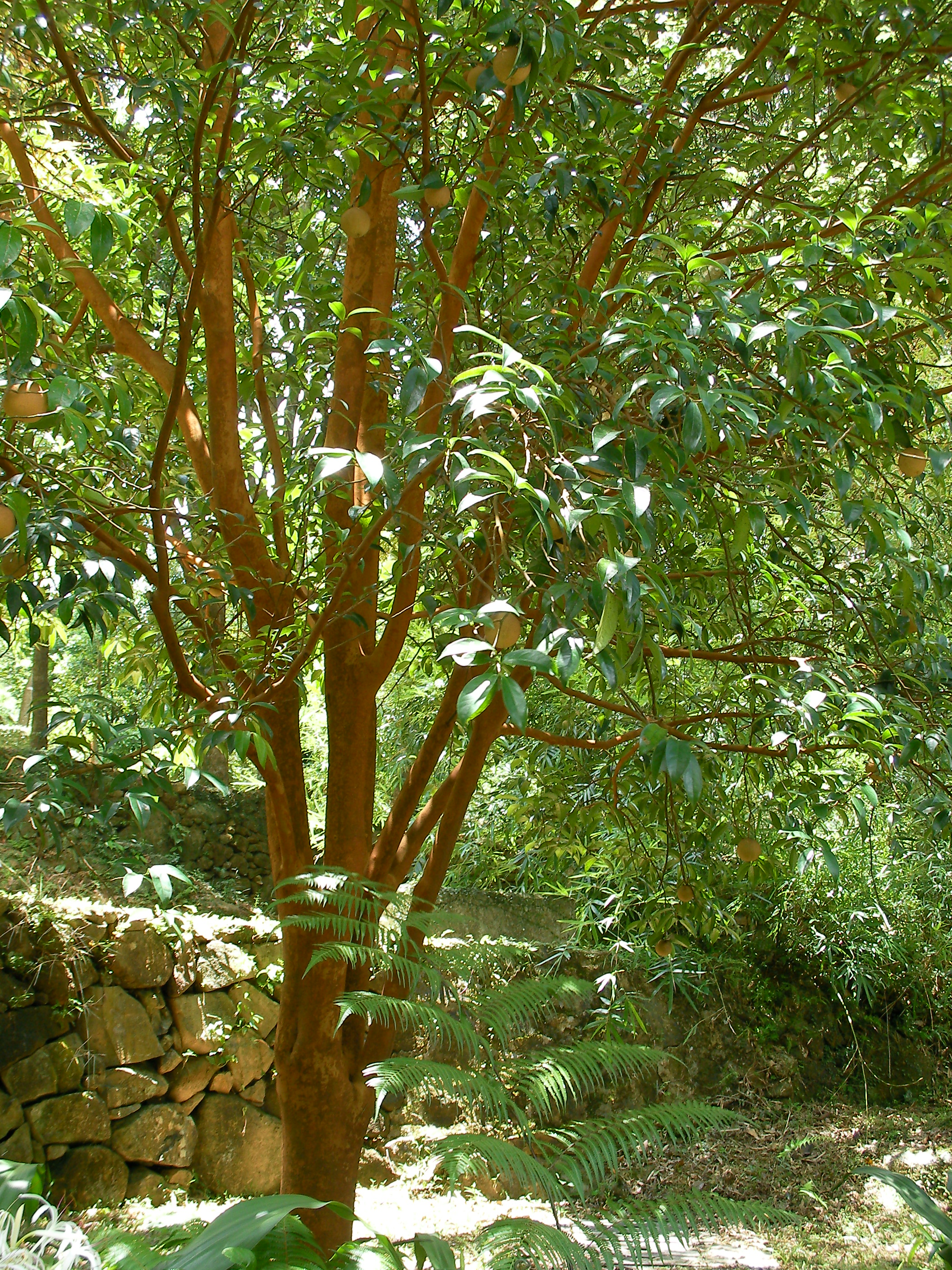

Conservation status
- Vulnerable (IUCN 2.3)

Scientific classification
- Kingdom: Plantae
- Clade: Tracheophytes
- Clade: Angiosperms
- Clade: Eudicots
- Clade: Asterids
- Order: Ericales
- Family: Theaceae
- Genus: Camellia
- Species: C. crapnelliana

Binomial name
- Camellia crapnelliana Tutcher

= Camellia crapnelliana =

Species of tree

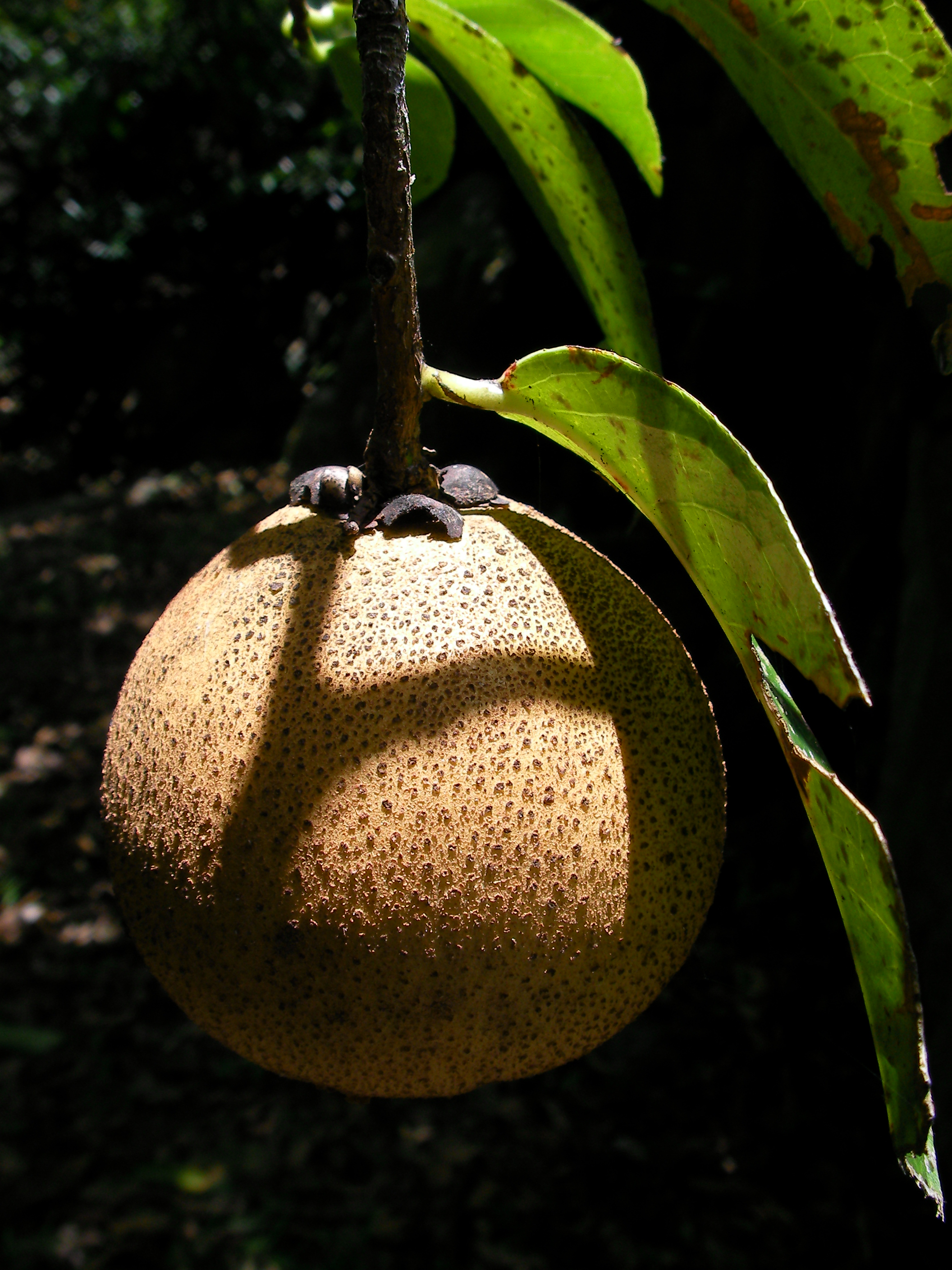
Fruit of Camellia crapnelliana

Camellia crapnelliana, Crapnell's camellia (Chinese: 紅皮糙果茶 or 克氏茶), is a flowering Camellia native to Hong Kong and other parts of south-eastern China.

In 1903, the species was first collected and described by W. J. Tutcher from Mount Parker, Hong Kong; only one plant was found at that time.

== Description ==
Camellia crapnelliana is a 5–7 metres [16–23 ft] tall small tree with thickly leathery leaves and solitary and terminal flowers.

== Distribution ==
It is distributed in Hong Kong on Mount Parker, and in Mau Ping on Ma On Shan peak. It is also distributed in Guangxi, Fujian, Zhejiang in China.

== Uses ==
The seed oil is edible.

Camellia crapnelliana was introduced to Japan in 1968. Only a small number of plants have been cultivated in Japan because grafting on Camellia japonica or Camellia sasanqua is difficult.

== Conservation ==
In Hong Kong, Camellia crapnelliana is a protected species under Forestry Regulations Cap. 96A.
