= Romain Jacquet-Lagrèze =

French photographer

Romain Jacquet-Lagrèze (born 1987) is a French photographer known for his work capturing modern urban life in the city of Hong Kong. His photographic work started in 2012 with Vertical Horizon, a photo book focused on the city's vertical architecture, which gave him international visibility.

== Notable work ==
=== Vertical Horizon ===
Vertical Horizon is a collection of photographs capturing the densely populated city of Hong Kong from the ground, in the midst of building. It was published as a book of the same name in 2012 and exhibited for the first time in 2013 in Hong Kong. The cover of the book depicts the Monster Building, a residential complex in Quarry Bay which was later used as a set in the movie Transformers: Age of Extinction (2014) and has become a hotspot for photographer on social networks since then.

=== The Blue Moment ===
The Blue Moment is a series of photographs taken during the blue hour, while the sunlight's blue wavelengths dominate and tint all the colourless surfaces into shades of blue. In their compositions, many of Jacquet-Lagrèze's photographs are depicting the contrast between Hong Kong's dense cityscape and the serenity of nature represented by waterscape and lush greenery of the mountains surrounding the city. The series was published as a photo book and exhibited for the first time in Hong Kong in 2016.

=== Concrete Stories ===
Concrete Stories is a diptych of photo books published in 2018 and 2022. It consists in photographs capturing various moments on Hong Kong’s rooftops. It is focused on people’s lifestyle in the older districts of the city, especially in Kowloon which has the biggest density of old buildings. It documents how people make use of the space available on the shared rooftops of their buildings in order to cope with the restrained surface of their home. For this project, Jacquet-Lagreze cropped most of the photos vertically in order to give a feeling of narrowness to the viewer, inspired by the work of Fan Ho who was famous for cropping his photos.

=== City Poetry ===
City Poetry is a project focused on old signage found in the oldest neighbourhoods of Hong Kong. The project consist of collage of characters selected for their meaning and complementary colours. By shooting only individual character Jacquet-Lagrèze strips off the original meaning of the sign it has been shot on in order to give a new meaning when put next to other characters. City Poetry was first exhibited at Blue Lotus Gallery in Hong Kong in 2019. In 2022, it was exhibited as a part of a group show organised by the HKTDC in Time Square (Hong Kong). One artwork was selected as a part of the group show 'By the People - 字由人' at the Hong Kong Museum of Art from 2022 to 2023.

== Selected exhibitions ==
=== Solo ===
- Vertical Horizon, Hotel Panorama, Hong Kong, 2013.
- The Blue Moment, Blue Lotus Gallery, Hong Kong, 2016.
- City Poetry, Blue Lotus Gallery, Hong Kong, 2019.
- Thirty-six Views of Lion Rock, Blue Lotus Gallery, Hong Kong, 2022.

=== Group ===
- Hong Kong Dimensions, Blue Lotus Gallery, Hong Kong, 2019.
- Art & City at Times Square, organised by HKTDC, Hong Kong, 2022.
- By the People - 字由人, Hong Kong Museum of Art, September 2022 to October 2023.
- One City, Two Tales, duo exhibition with Fan Ho, Unseen Amsterdam, September 2024.

== Books ==
- Vertical Horizon. Hong Kong: Asia One Books, 2012. ISBN 978-988-15316-8-1.
- Wild Concrete, Hong Kong: Asia One Books, 2014. ISBN 978-988-13179-2-6.
- The Blue Moment, Hong Kong: Asia One Books, 2016. ISBN 978-988-13922-6-8.
- Concrete Stories, Hong Kong: Asia One Books, 2018. ISBN 978-988-77121-9-0.
- Concrete Stories II, Hong Kong: Asia One Books, 2022. ISBN 978-988-79177-5-5.
- 獅子山三十六景 Thirty-Six Views of Hong Kong, Hong Kong: Blue Lotus Edition, 2022. ISBN 978-988-76192-0-8.
