= Taikoo Shing =

Housing estate in Quarry Bay, Hong Kong

Coordinates: 22.286335°N 114.217644°E

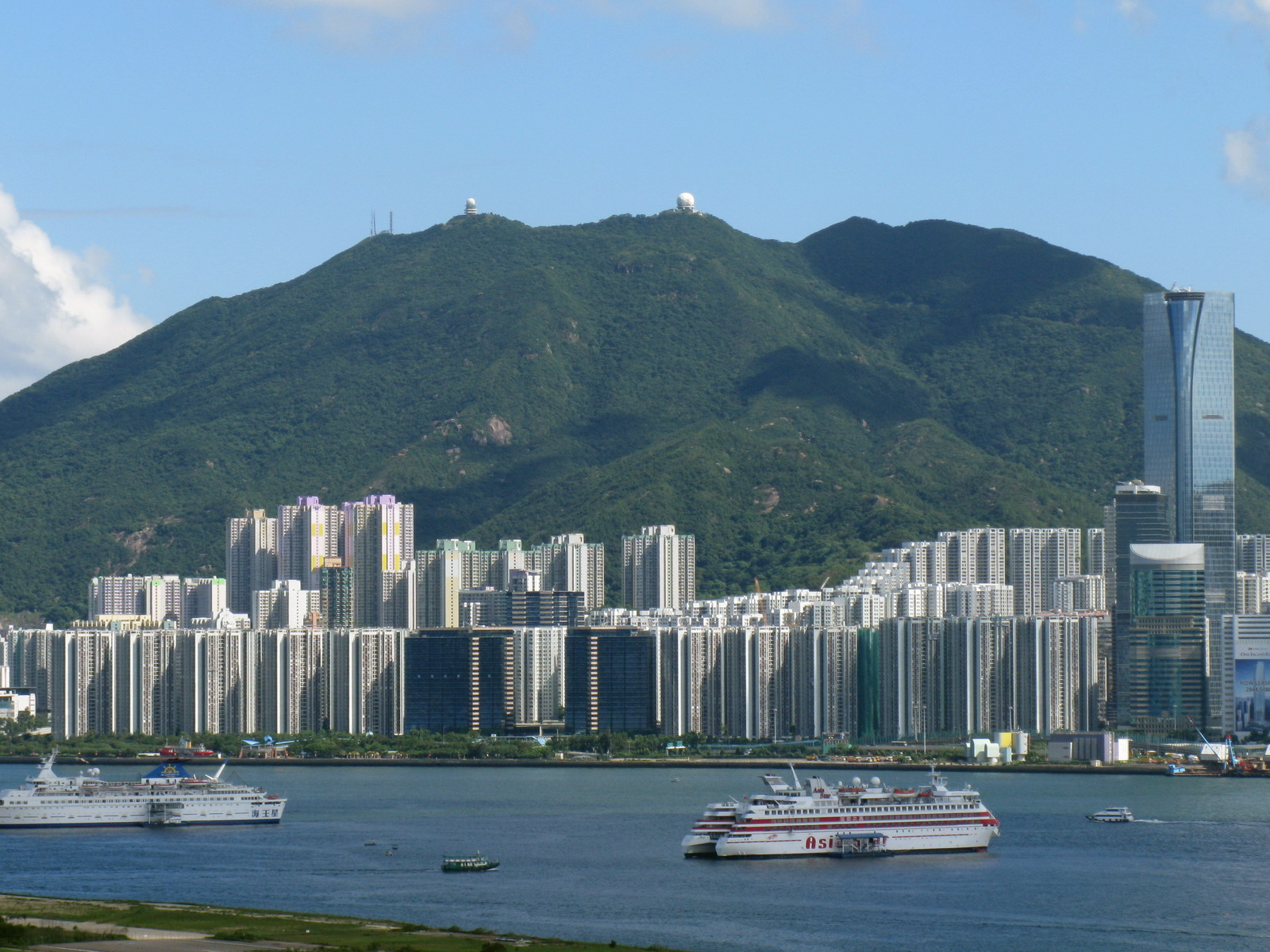
- Taikoo Shing in 2008
- Chinese: 太古城
- Cantonese Yale: Taaigúsìhng
- Literal meaning: Swire City
Transcriptions
Standard Mandarin
- Hanyu Pinyin: Tàigǔchéng
- Gwoyeu Romatzyh: Tayguucherng
- IPA: [tʰâɪ.kù.ʈʂʰə̌ŋ]
Yue: Cantonese
- Yale Romanization: Taaigúsìhng
- Jyutping: Taai3gu2sing4
- IPA: [tʰāːi.kǔː.sȅŋ]

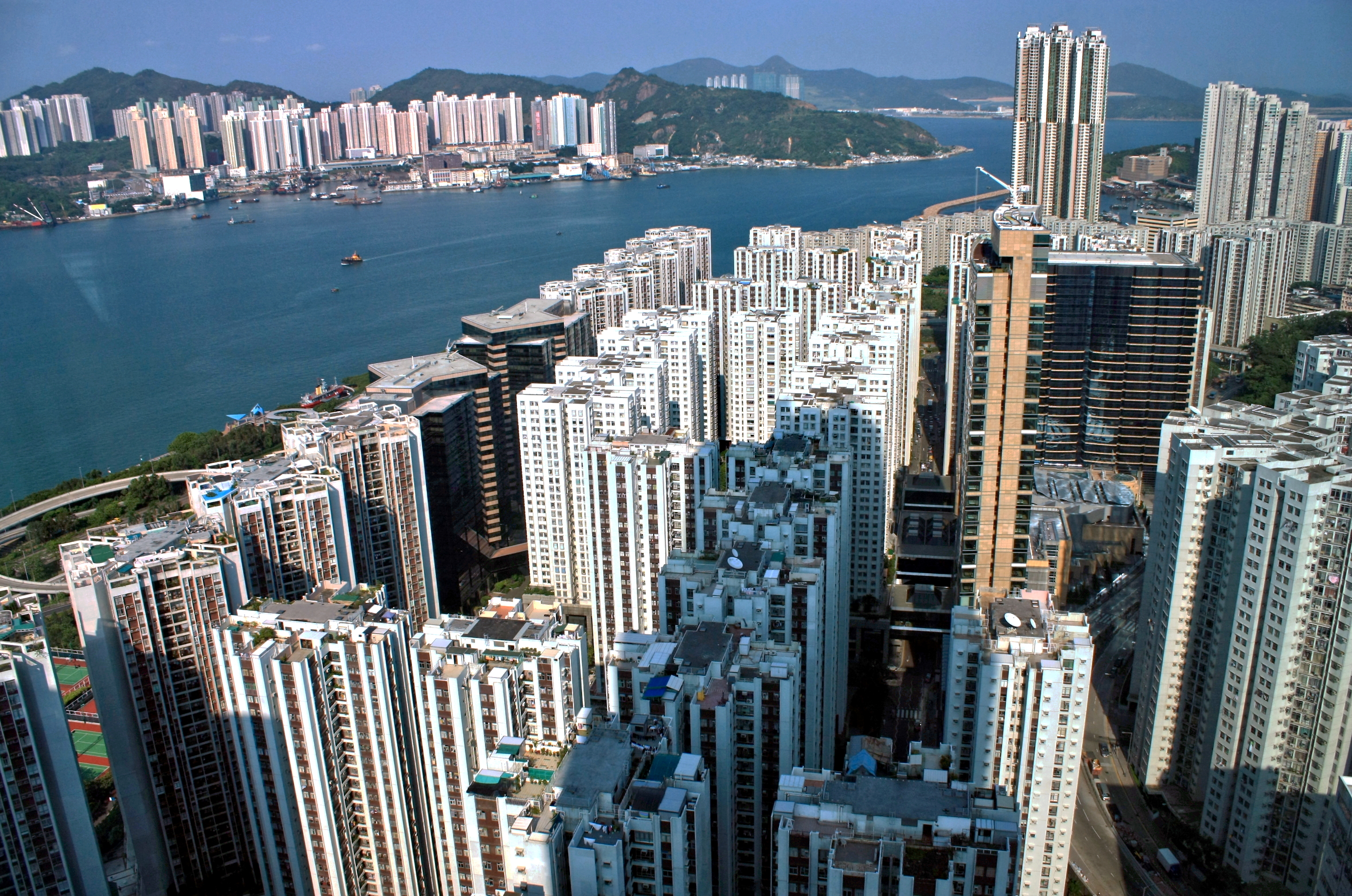
Taikoo Shing in 2009

Taikoo Shing or Tai Koo Shing (Cantonese pronunciation: [tʰāːi.kǔː sȅŋ]), is a private residential development in Quarry Bay, in the eastern part of Hong Kong Island, Hong Kong. It is a part of Swire's property business, along with Taikoo Place, the adjacent Cityplaza retail and office complex, and EAST, a lifestyle business hotel.

== Etymology ==
Taikoo is the Cantonese pronunciation of Swire's Chinese name, while Shing can be literally translated as City. Thus, Taikoo Shing can be loosely translated as Swire City. According to Swire, its Chinese name Taikoo was chosen by Thomas Taylor Meadow, the British Consul in Shanghai when Swire's Shanghai office opened in 1866.

== Area ==
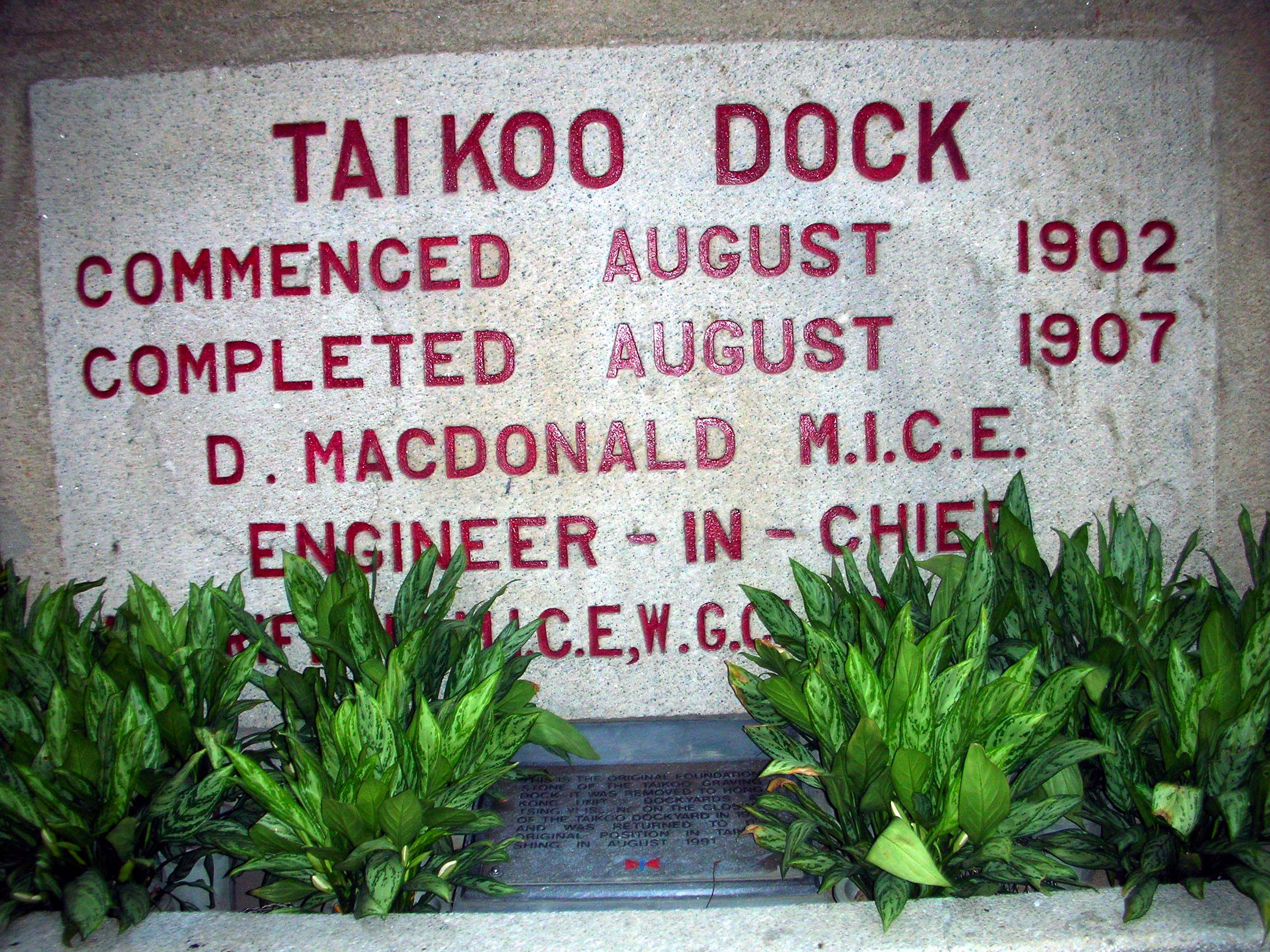
Taikoo Shing dock plaque now within the Cityplaza area

The entire Taikoo Shing estate covers 21.5 hectares (53 acres), and consists of 61 residential towers, with a total of 12,690 apartment flats that ranges anywhere between 489 square feet (45.4 m^{2}) to 1,114 square feet (103.5 m^{2}).

== History ==
The Taikoo Shing estate was once the site of Taikoo Dockyard, whose foundation stone now lies beside Cityplaza. The dockyard moved to United Dockyards at the west shore of the Tsing Yi Island in the late 1970s, and Taikoo Shing was constructed over the site in stages, with constructions of all main residential buildings complete by the early 1990s.

As part of the business strategy, Swire Properties was established in 1972 immediately after the closing of the dockyard. Taikoo Shing became one of Hong Kong's first major private housing estates. Completing in 1986, Swire immediately became one of the largest property companies doing the construction themselves. The area was designed to maximise middle-class residential capacity.

Development of commercial areas still continues today. After the completion of Cityplaza 3 and 4 as office buildings, the original Cityplaza 1 was demolished in the mid-90s for redevelopment. As of 2007, the food market that was originally constructed was demolished to make room for a hotel.

== Population and demographics ==
In the 2021 census, Taikoo Shing recorded 34,799 residents.

Apartment flats in Taikoo Shing are popular amongst buyers and speculators, and for a significant time in the 1980s and 1990s, Taikoo Shing's housing price is a general indicator of the Hong Kong's housing market health in general. Although in recent years, newer housing developments have eroded a bit of Taikoo Shing's once prominent status.

The estate is also a very sought-after place to live for the Japanese and Korean expatriate communities in Hong Kong, most of which are staffed in multinational corporations based in Hong Kong. As a result of this significant Korean and Japanese settlement, the area has many Korean and Japanese-themed service establishments.

== Housing ==
Taikoo Shing housing map

The housing in Taikoo Shing was developed in stages, with the Tsui Woo Terrace being the first ones constructed. In all, the estate's housing complexes are broken down into 6 terraces and 2 gardens, each with a special naming scheme.

=== Tsui Woo Terrace ===
Tsui Woo Terrace (翠湖台, literally: "Terrace of the Jade Lake"); all of the mansions on this terrace are named after famous lakes in China. The terrace consists of three mansions.

- Tung Ting Mansion (洞庭閣) Note: The name is a reference to Dongting Lake.
- Po Yang Mansion (鄱陽閣) Note: The name is a reference to Poyang Lake.
- Tai Woo Mansion (太湖閣) Note: The name is a reference to Lake Tai.

=== Ko Shan Terrace ===
Ko Shan Terrace (高山台, literally: "Terrace of the High Mountain"); all of the mansions on this terrace have the Chinese word for "Mountain" (山) as the second character of the building's name. A couple of the mansion's names also corresponds to famous mountains in China. The terrace consists of 13 mansions.

- Tung Shan Mansion (東山閣)
- Tien Shan Mansion (天山閣)
- Tai Shan Mansion (泰山閣)
- Lo Shan Mansion (廬山閣)
- Nam Shan Mansion (南山閣)
- Po Shan Mansion (寶山閣)
- Heng Shan Mansion (恒山閣)
- Wah Shan Mansion (華山閣)
- Loong Shan Mansion (龍山閣)
- Foong Shan Mansion (鳳山閣)
- Yee Shan Mansion (怡山閣)
- Kam Shan Mansion (金山閣)
- Fu Shan Mansion (富山閣)

=== Kam Din Terrace ===
Kam Din Terrace (金殿台, literally: "Terrace of the Golden Palace"); all of the mansions on this terrace have the Chinese word for "Palace" (宮) as the second character of the building's name. In addition, all of the mansions names' first character corresponds to various political dynasties in Chinese history. The terrace consists of 8 mansions.

- Tang Kung Mansion (唐宮閣) Note: The first character of this mansion's name is a reference to the Tang dynasty.
- Yen Kung Mansion (燕宮閣) Note: The first character of this mansion's name is a reference to a rebel dynasty the Yen Dynasty in ancient China during the An Lushan rebellion.
- Yuan Kung Mansion (元宮閣) Note: The first character of this mansion's name is a reference to the Yuan dynasty.
- Ming Kung Mansion (明宮閣) Note: The first character of this mansion's name is a reference to the Ming dynasty.
- Hsia Kung Mansion (夏宮閣) Note: The first character of this mansion's name is a reference to the Xia dynasty.
- Han Kung Mansion (漢宮閣) Note: The first character of this mansion's name is a reference to the Han dynasty.
- Chai Kung Mansion (齊宮閣) Note:The first character of this mansion's name is a reference to the Qi dynasty.
- Tsui Kung Mansion (隋宮閣) Note: The first character of this mansion's name is a reference to the Sui dynasty.

=== On Shing Terrace ===
On Shing Terrace (安盛台, literally: "Terrace of Peace and Prosperity"); all of the mansions on this terrace have the Chinese word for "Peace" (安) as the second character of the building's name. The terrace consists of 6 mansions.

- Ning On Mansion (寧安閣)
- Po On Mansion (寶安閣)
- Shun On Mansion (順安閣)
- Hing On Mansion (興安閣)
- Kin On Mansion (建安閣)
- Ko On Mansion (高安閣)

=== Harbour View Gardens ===
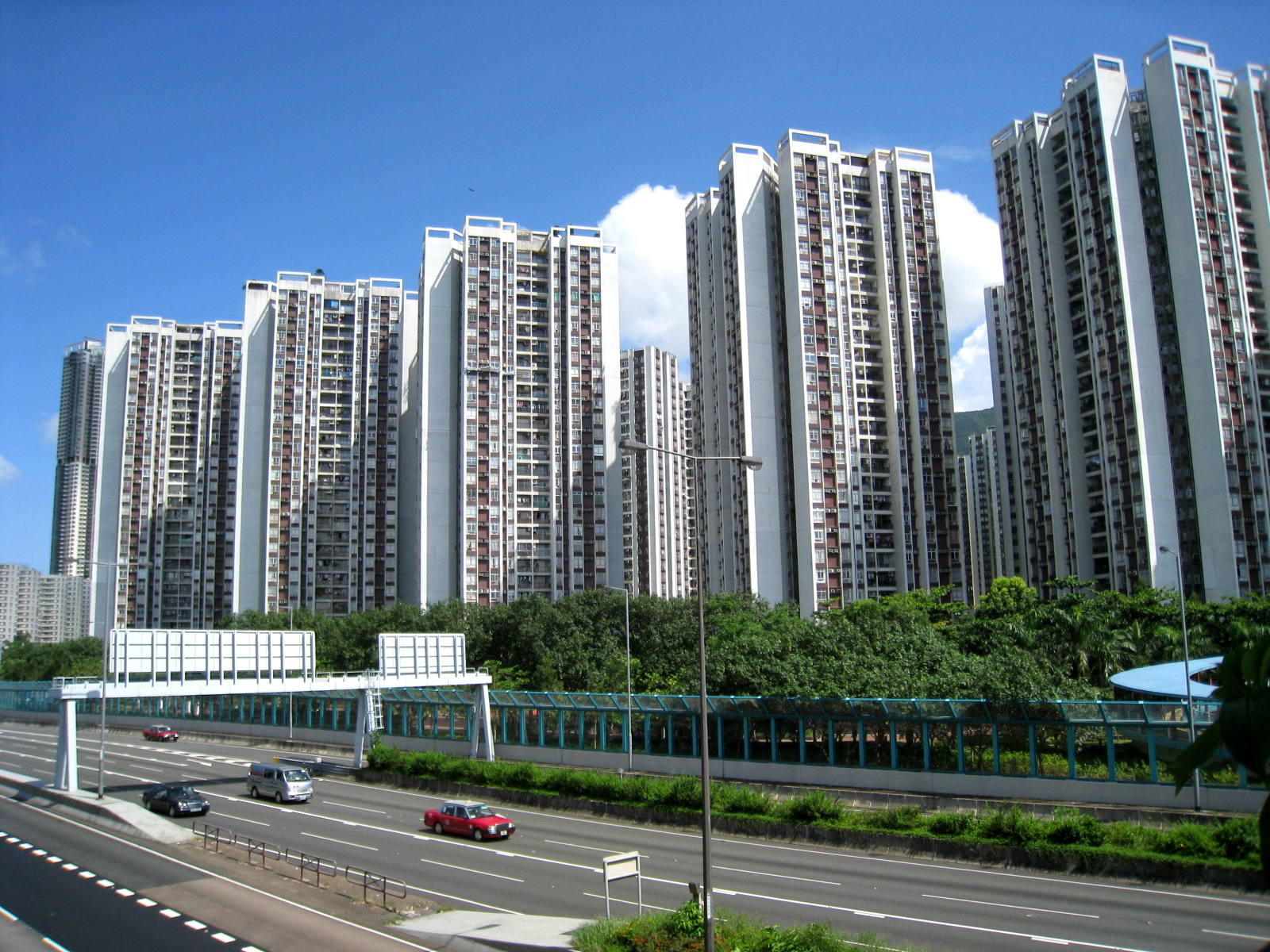
Harbour View Gardens (海景花園)

Harbour View Gardens (海景花園); all of the mansions in this area are named after flora. The area consists of 11 mansions.

- Pine Mansion (青松閣)
- Banyan Mansion (翠榕閣)
- Willow Mansion (綠楊閣)
- Oak Mansion (紫樺閣)
- Maple Mansion (金楓閣)
- Juniper Mansion (銀栢閣)
- Marigold Mansion (美菊閣)
- Begonia Mansion (海棠閣)
- Lotus Mansion (雅蓮閣)
- Wisteria Mansion (碧藤閣)
- Primrose Mansion (春櫻閣)

=== Kwun Hoi Terrace ===
Kwun Hoi Terrace (觀海台, literally: "Terrace for Ocean Viewing"); all of the mansions on this terrace have the Chinese word for "Ocean" (海) as the second character of the building's name, and a cardinal direction as the first character of the building's name. The terrace consists of 3 mansions.

- Pak Hoi Mansion (北海閣)
- Tung Hoi Mansion (東海閣)
- Nam Hoi Mansion (南海閣)

=== Sing Fai Terrace ===
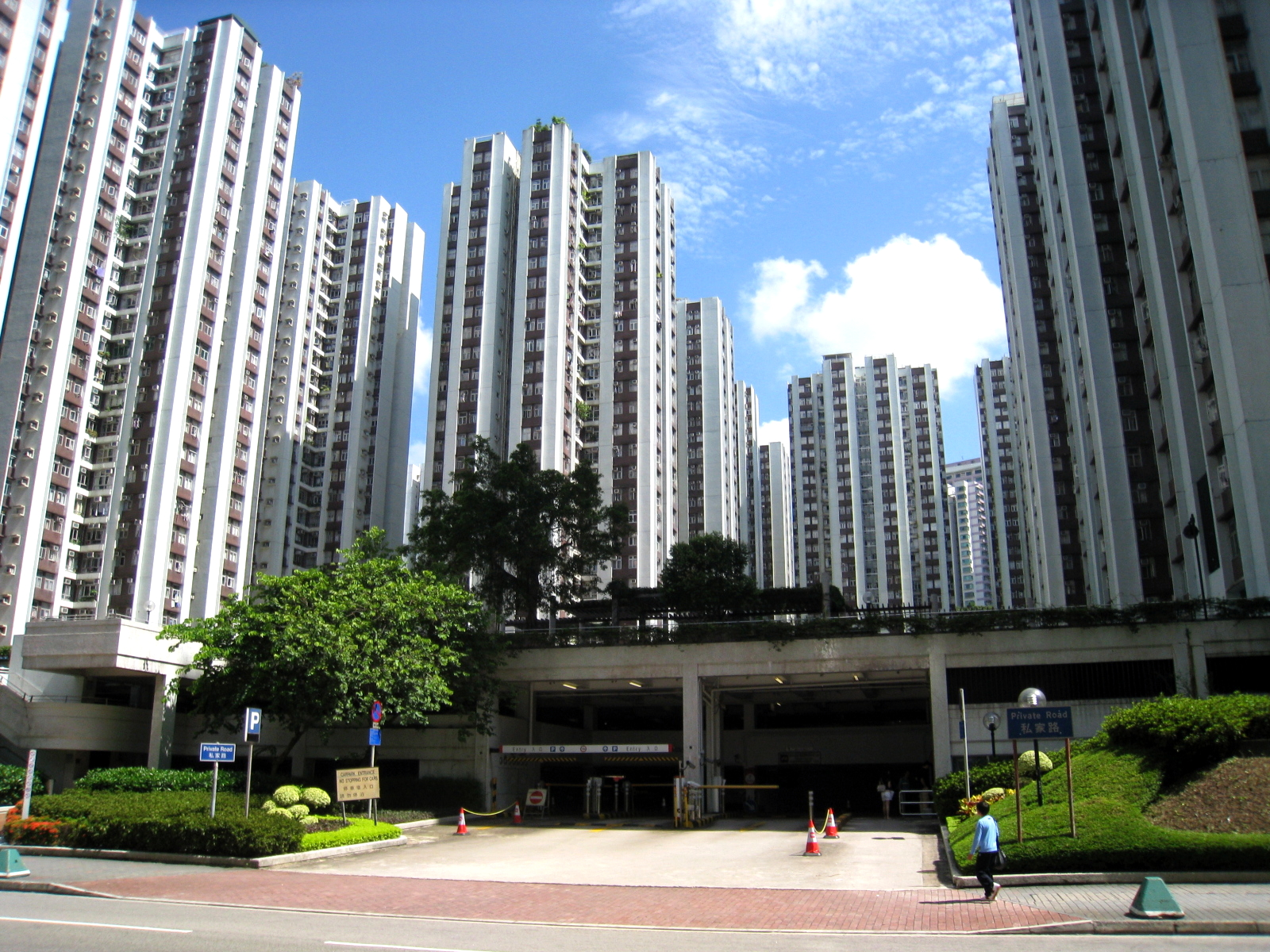
Sing Fai Terrace (星輝台)

Sing Fai Terrace (星輝台, literally: "Terrace of the Stars"); all of the mansions on this terrace have the Chinese word for "star" (星) as the second character of the building's name. Some of the building names are similar to Chinese names for planets within the Solar System. The terrace consists of 8 mansions.

- Hang Sing Mansion (恒星閣)
- Tien Sing Mansion (天星閣)
- Hoi Sing Mansion (海星閣)
- Wai Sing Mansion (衛星閣)
- Yiu Sing Mansion (耀星閣)
- Chi Sing Mansion (智星閣)
- Kam Sing Mansion (金星閣)
- Ngan Sing Mansion (銀星閣)

=== Horizon Garden ===
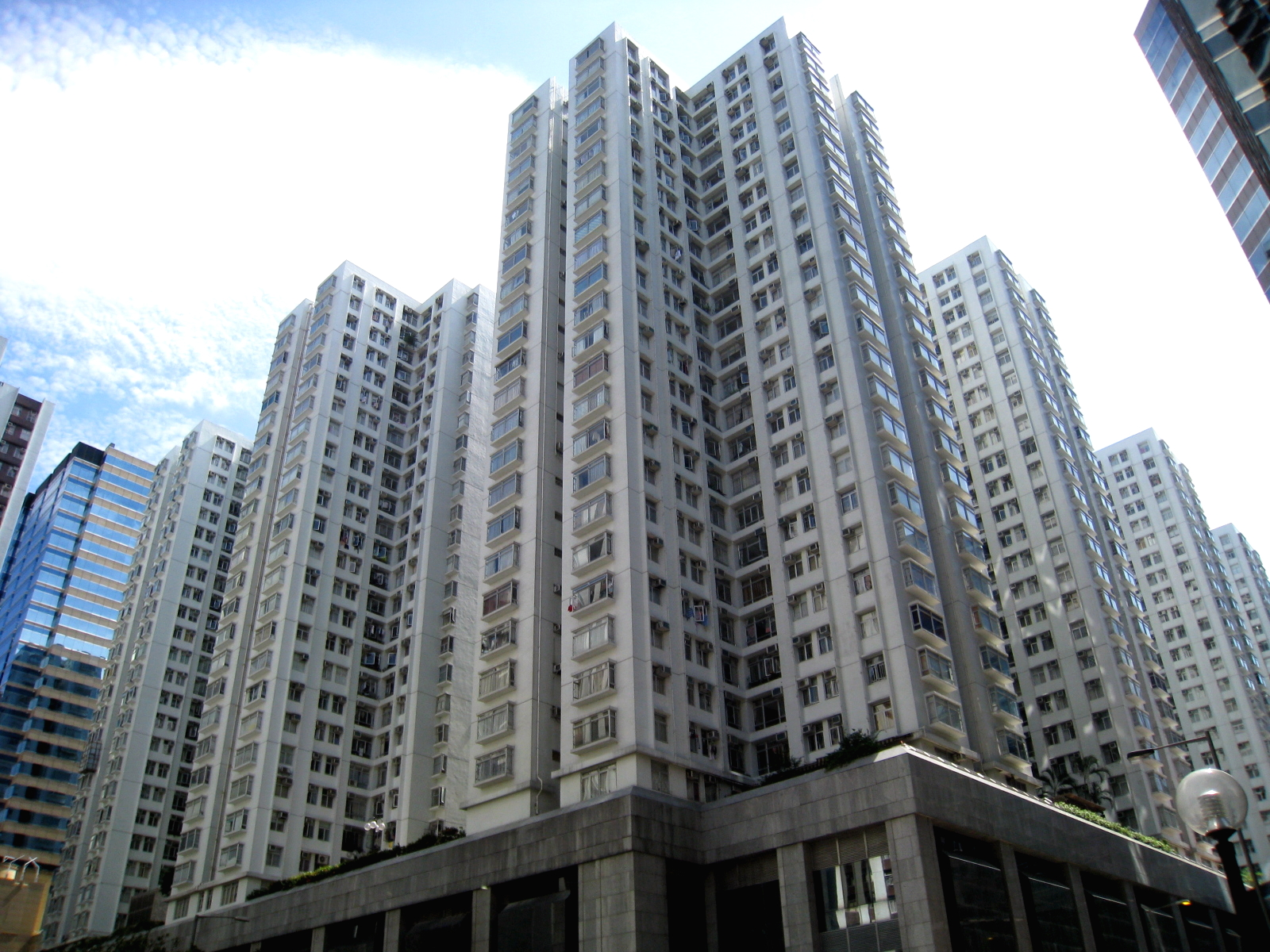
Horizon Gardens (海天花園), the newest complex

Horizon Garden (海天花園); all of the mansions on this terrace have the Chinese word for "sky" (天) as the second character of the building's name. The area consists of 9 mansions.

- Kai Tien Mansion (啓天閣)
- Hoi Tien Mansion (海天閣)
- Fu Tien Mansion (富天閣)
- Choi Tien Mansion (彩天閣)
- Heng Tien Mansion (恒天閣)
- Kwun Tien Mansion (冠天閣)
- Yat Tien Mansion (逸天閣)
- Nam Tien Mansion (南天閣)
- King Tien Mansion (景天閣)

== Amenities ==
Some terraces - Horizon Gardens, Kam Din Terrace, Sing Fai Terrace, and Kao Shan Terrace - have podiums that provide a public space for their residents, often including a children's playground. Elderly residents may practice tai chi in the mornings. There are also shops and learning centres on these podiums such as Kumon.

A Chuck E. Cheese's Pizza Time Theatre was located at the estate when Hong Kong was a British colony, opening between 1984 and 1985 and closing in 1992.

In addition, Harbour View Gardens, Horizon Gardens and Kwun Hoi Terrace all have access to swimming pools. In Kao Shan Terrace, there are badminton courts and tennis courts for residents to use.

== Education ==
There are a few kindergartens in the vicinity of Tai Koo Shing, as well as the international school DSC International School.

Taikoo Shing is in Primary One Admission (POA) School Net 14. Within the school net are multiple aided schools (operated independently but funded with government money) and North Point Government Primary School (北角官立小學).

== Car parks ==
All terraces have indoor car parks, providing parking spaces on monthly lease.

There are parking spaces available for visitors on hourly rate in the car parks at Cityplaza and Sing Fai Terrace.

== Transportation ==
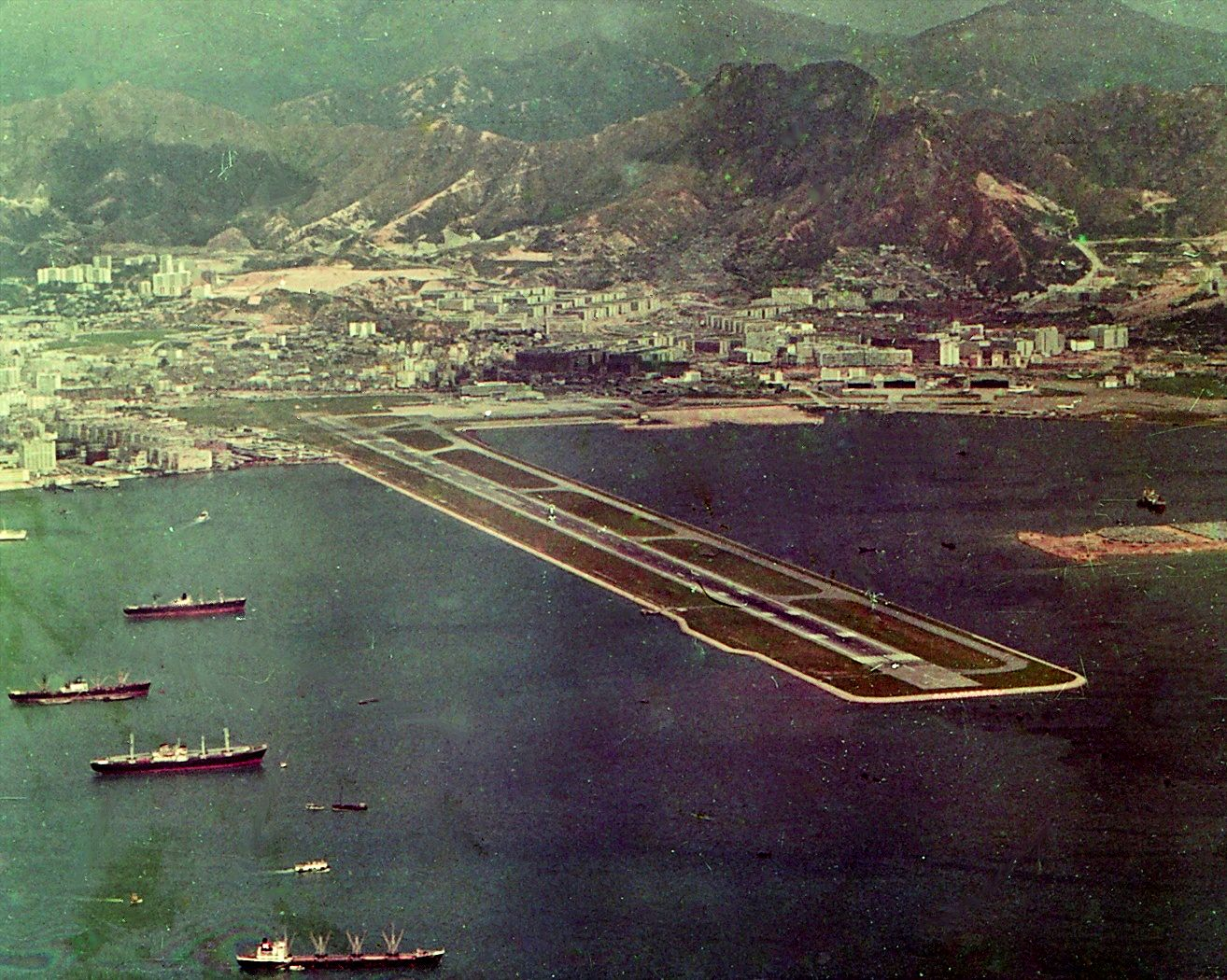
The old airport, Kai Tak airport, is opposite Taikoo Shing

The estate is served by MTR Tai Koo station of the Island line, as well as various bus lines, served by Citybus and the Kowloon Motor Bus to Shau Kei Wan, Admiralty, Sheung Wan, Tsim Sha Tsui and Jordan.

As it is a private estate, all roads were owned by Swire Properties. However, most roads were returned to the Government except for those near Cityplaza. In practice, public traffic is generally allowed to pass freely, but admission may be denied.

== See also ==
- Cityplaza
- Taikoo Place
- Kornhill and Kornhill Gardens
- Nam Fung Sun Chuen
- King's Road
- Island Eastern Corridor
- North Point
- Quarry Bay
