= DSC International School, Hong Kong =

International secondary school in Hong Kong

DSC International School
- 德思齊加拿大國際學校
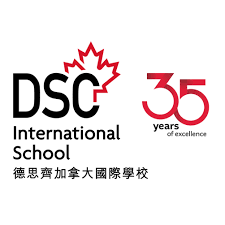

- Picture of the School in 2024

Location
- Tai Fung Avenue, Taikoo Shing; Hong Kong; 22.284998°N 114.219346°E

Information
- Type: Ontario Secondary School Diploma (OSSD)
- Motto: Dream! Succeed! Celebrate!
- Established: Taikoo Shing campus in 1986
- School district: Eastern District
- Principal: Head of School – Dr. Jason Walter; Principal (Secondary) – Dr. Allan Morrison; Principal (Elementary) – Ms. Adrianna Mahoney; Vice Principal (Secondary) – Dr. Jonathan Comeau; Vice Principal (Secondary) – Mrs. Rebecca Marans; Vice Principal (Elementary) – Mrs. Peony Shephard; Vice Principal (Admissions) – Mrs. Sarah Miles
- Staff: 160
- Grades: Early Years; Elementary; Secondary; OSSD+ Signature Program
- Enrollment: 1300
- Colours: Red, White and Black
- Athletics: International Schools Sports Federation Hong Kong
- Mascot: Maple Leaf
- Affiliation: CTF Education Group
- Website: www.dsc.edu.hk

DSC International School, Hong Kong
- Traditional Chinese: 德思齊加拿大國際學校
- Simplified Chinese: 德思齐加拿大国际学校
Transcriptions
Standard Mandarin
- Hanyu Pinyin: Désīqí Jiānádà Guójì Xuéxiào
Yue: Cantonese
- Jyutping: dak1 si1 cai4 gaa1 naa4 daai6 gwok3 zai3 hok6 haau6

Delia School of Canada
- Traditional Chinese: 地利亞加拿大學校
- Simplified Chinese: 地利亚加拿大学校
Transcriptions
Standard Mandarin
- Hanyu Pinyin: Dìlìyà Jiānádà Xuéxiào
Yue: Cantonese
- Jyutping: dei6 lei6 aa3 gaa1 naa4 daai6 hok6 haau6

DSC International School (Chinese: 德思齊加拿大國際學校), formerly the Delia School of Canada, is a Canadian private school in Hong Kong, China.

The school was founded in 1986 which offers Ontario curriculum (registered in the province of Ontario as an international private school). It has students from over 50 countries and offers kindergarten, primary and secondary education in three separate buildings. The school was first intended as a local school for the new residential development in Taikoo Shing.

After completing Ontario program of study, and having met all graduation requirements, DSC students are awarded the Ontario Secondary School Diploma (OSSD). Graduates from DSC have routinely been accepted into top universities worldwide. The school adopted its current name in 2021.

== Early years ==
Early Years Programme provides 3 to 5 year-olds with multiple opportunities to develop the knowledge and skills within the four frames of our play and inquiry-based curriculum.

== Elementary ==
Elementary Programme focuses on literacy, numeracy, STEAM, and passion projects across all grades. Our Elementary students take the following courses: English, Literacy, Mathematics, Science and Technology, Social Studies, Health and Physical Education, the Arts (Drama, Dance, Visual Arts, and Music) and International Languages (French, Japanese or Putonghua).

== Secondary ==
Secondary Programme consists of Middle School (Grades 7 and 8) and High School (Grades 9 through 12). Middle School section is designed to create a smooth transition from Elementary to Secondary. Students in Grades 7 and 8 have a rotary system where they travel with their homeroom to specialised subject teachers throughout the day.

The school currently offers the Ontario curriculum. However, Alberta Education was first introduced and offered in the Taikoo Shing campus for Grade 1 to Grade 6 in September 2015. In September 2018, the Alberta curriculum section moved into a newly renovated home in Kwun Tong (formerly known as Delia Memorial School (Yuet Wah) ), provides education for Grade 1 to Grade 9 students. It is an Accredited International School that implements the Alberta Program of Studies, which is internationally recognized curriculum from the province of Alberta, Canada.

From 2020, the school began to merge its Kowloon East campus with its main campus in Taikoo Shing, students there were also relocated to the Taikoo Shing campus by 2021. The campus was converted into the secondary campus for Nord Anglia International School Hong Kong.

== OSSD+ Signature Programme ==
OSSD + Signature Programme allows students to focus on a specialised academic discipline, enhanced community outreach and leadership development, real-world experience, and career mentorship through work placement. Our bespoke programmes offer a great opportunity to maximise the high school experience and acquire the skills necessary to make a positive difference in the local and global communities.
