= Mount Parker (Hong Kong) =

Mountain in Hong Kong

- 柏架山
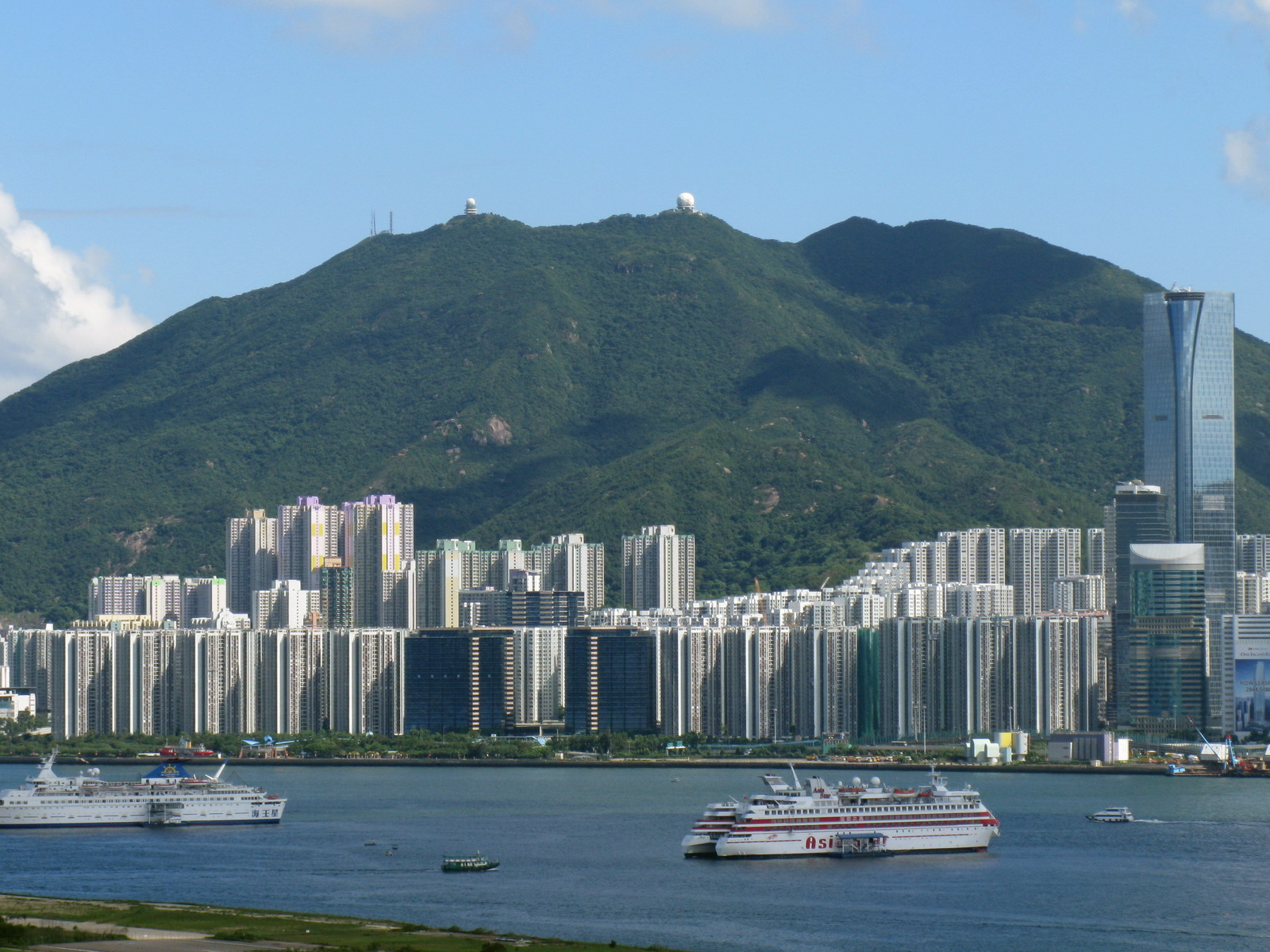
- Mount Parker from Kowloon in July 2008

Highest point
- Elevation: 532 m (1,745 ft); HKPD
- Coordinates: 22°15′55.7″N 114°13′8.9″E

Naming
- Native name: 柏架山 (Chinese)

Geography
- Location within Hong Kong
- Location: Hong Kong

Mount Parker
- Chinese: 柏架山
Transcriptions
Standard Mandarin
- Hanyu Pinyin: Bǎijià Shān
Yue: Cantonese
- Yale Romanization: Paak gá sāan
- Jyutping: Paak3 gaa2 saan1

Mount Parker is the second-highest peak at 532 metres (1,745 ft) on Hong Kong Island, after Victoria Peak at 552 m (1,811 ft). It is the 40th-highest peak in the territory of Hong Kong.

== Name ==
It is named after Admiral of the Fleet Sir William Parker, 1st Baronet, of Shenstone.

== Environment ==
=== Ecology ===
A rare native tree, the Hong Kong camellia (Camellia hongkongensis), can be found growing on Mount Parker, while another species, Crapnell's camellia (Camellia crapnelliana), was first discovered on the peak.

== Road restrictions ==
Much of the mountain is in a protected country park area. The roads that go up this mountain are access-restricted. Motorcycles, cars, bicycles, electric scooters without a special permit are not allowed on these roads, and the people who are caught may incur a penalty.

== Gallery ==
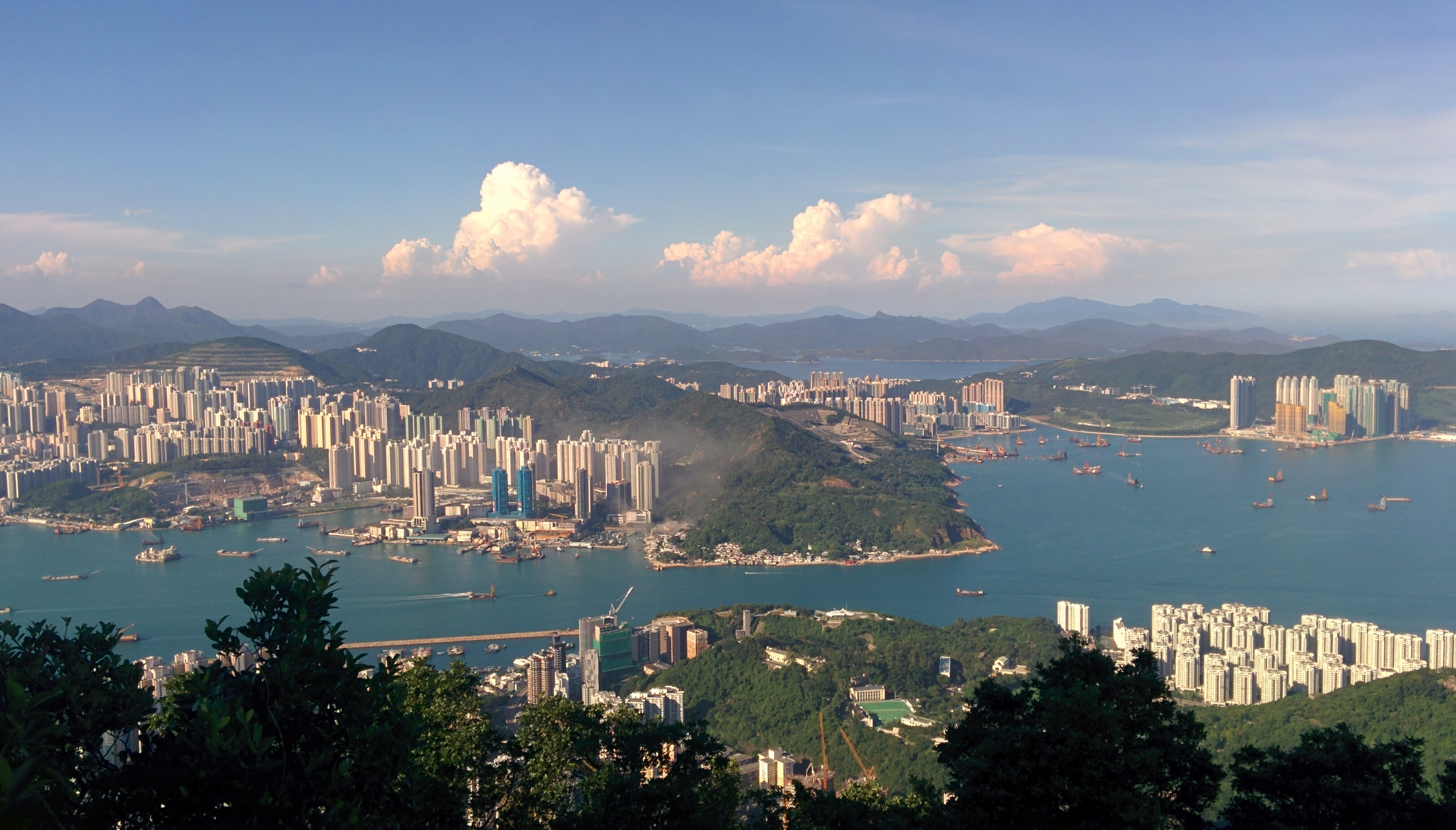
View from the top of Mount Parker toward Kowloon and Tseung Kwan O in September 2019

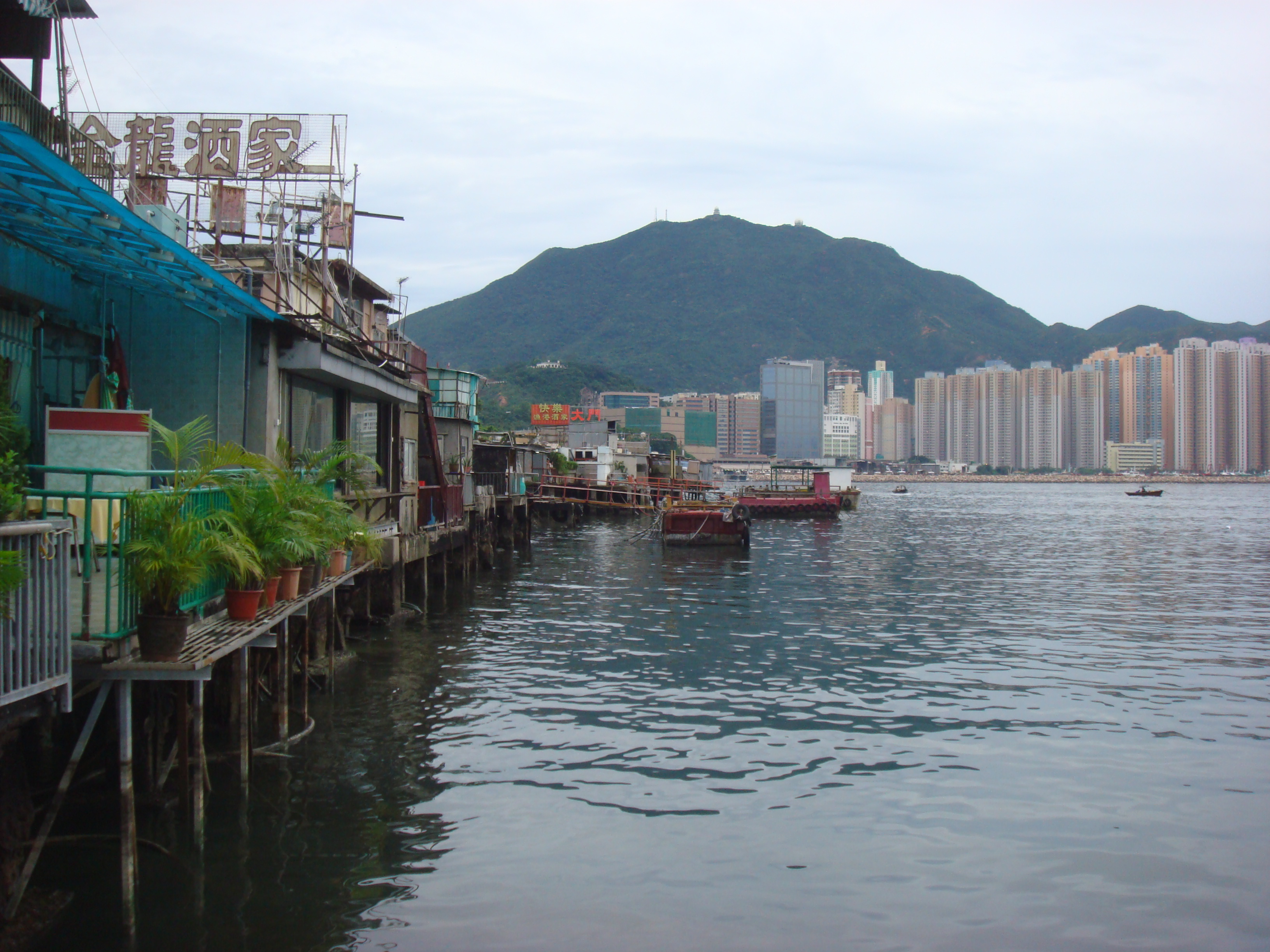
Mount Parker viewed from Sam Ka Tsuen Typhoon Shelter in 2008

== See also ==
- Kornhill
- Quarry Bay
- Tai Tam Country Park (Quarry Bay extension)
- List of mountains, peaks and hills in Hong Kong
- Geography of Hong Kong
