= Jardines =

Jardines or Jardine's may refer to:

== Places ==
- Jardines (Tren Urbano station), San Juan, Puerto Rico
- Jardines del Rey, an archipelago off the north coast of Cuba
- Jardines de la Reina, an archipelago off the south coast of Cuba
- Jardine's Lookout, a mountain and a residential area in Hong Kong
- Jardine's Bazaar, a road located in Causeway Bay, Hong Kong

== People ==
- Eliot A. Jardines, the first U.S. Assistant Deputy Director of National Intelligence for Open Source

== Other uses ==
- Jardines (company), a multinational Fortune Global 500 corporation based in Hong Kong
- Florida v. Jardines, a U.S. Supreme Court case about warrantless police "drug-dog sniff" at the front door of a residence
- Jardine SA, an association football club in Hong Kong
- Jardine's parrot, more commonly known as the red-fronted parrot

== See also ==
- Jardine (disambiguation)
- Jardin (disambiguation)
