= Mount Butler =

Hill on Hong Kong Island, Hong Kong

- 畢拿山
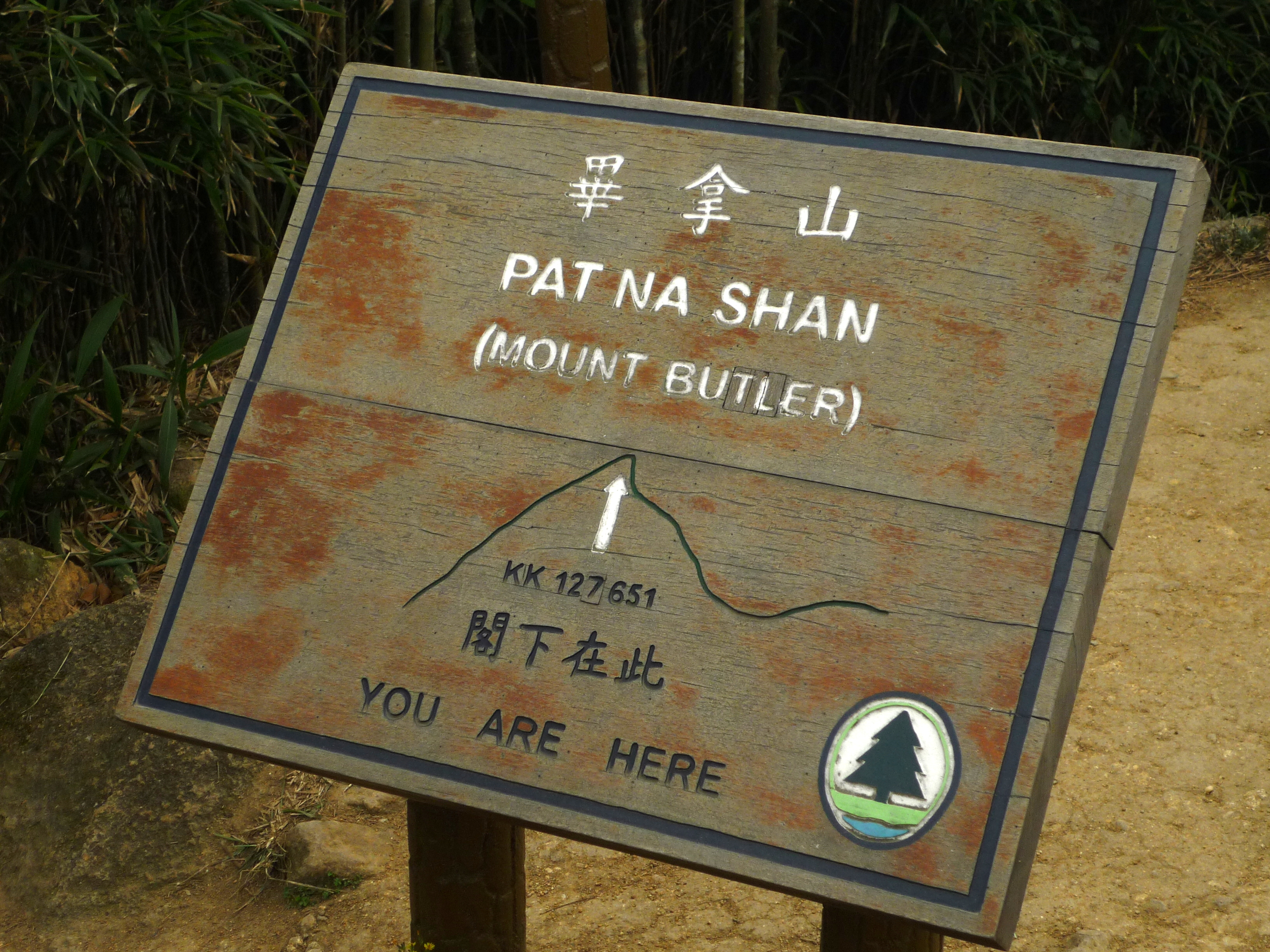
- Marker on Mount Butler's Summit

Highest point
- Elevation: 436 m (1,430 ft)
- Coordinates: 22°16′8.48″N 114°12′30.60″E

Geography
- Location within Hong Kong
- Location: Hong Kong

Mount Butler or Pat Na Shan (Chinese: 畢拿山) is a 436 m high hill on Hong Kong Island, Hong Kong.

== Access ==
Hong Kong Trail Stage 5 passes near the summit of Mount Butler. The best place to start the hike to the summit is from the Parkview apartment complex. The trail ascends steeply to Jardine's Lookout, continues to climb, then drops down a set of stairs for 10–15 minutes, then ascends steeply alongside a stone quarry. From the summit the view stretches to Lamma Island, Red Hill and Dragon's Back Trail. The descent from the summit is to Upper Tai Tam Reservoir. From here the hiker has several options, including continuing on to Stage 6 of the Hong Kong Trail, hiking or running to either Violet Hill or the Twins, or hiking out to Repulse Bay. The route has frequent maps, one public bathroom and no water stops so carry sufficient liquids with you.

== History ==
Canadians fought against the Japanese invaders on Mount Butler during World War II. On the slopes of Mount Butler, John Robert Osborn of the Winnipeg Grenadiers won the Victoria Cross for his gallantry and sacrifice during the battle. The site of his action is marked by a rock cairn near one of the walk trails.

== Others ==
A radio station called "Mount Butler H.F. Radio Receiving Station" is situated on nearby Siu Ma Shan, but the name Mount Butler is used nonetheless. Masts of the station can be seen from a distance. It was built in 1996 as part of the system that provides air-to-ground communications and METAR broadcasts for Hong Kong International Airport.

== See also ==
- Tai Tam Country Park (Quarry Bay extension)
- Mount Parker
- Geography of Hong Kong
