= Jardine (disambiguation) =

Jardine is a surname.

Jardine may also refer to:

- Jardine, Montana, United States
- Jardine, Queensland, Australia
- Jardine baronets, four baronetcies
- Jardine Matheson, or Jardines, a British multinational conglomerate
- Jardine Peak, Antarctica
- Jardine River, a river in Cape York, Queensland, Australia
- Jardine River, Queensland, a locality on Cape York, Queensland, Australia
- Clan Jardine

== See also ==
- Jardines (disambiguation)
- Jardin (disambiguation)
