= Dujardin =

Dujardin is a French surname, meaning "from the garden", and may refer to:

- Charlotte Dujardin (born 1985), British dressage rider
- Édouard Dujardin (1861–1949), French writer
- Félix Dujardin (1801–1860), French biologist
- Jean Dujardin (born 1972), French actor and comedian
- Karel Dujardin (1626–1678), Dutch painter
- Marbrianus Dujardin (Marbrianus de Orto), Netherlandish composer
- Paul Dujardin (1894–1959, French water polo player
- Alexandre Dujardin (born 1998), Hong Kong professional footballer
- Remi Dujardin (born 1997), Hong Kong professional footballer

== See also ==
- Jardin (disambiguation)
