= Battle of Hong Kong =

One of the first battles of the Pacific campaign of World War II

Coordinates: 22°16′57″N 114°09′40″E

- Part of the Pacific Theatre of World War II
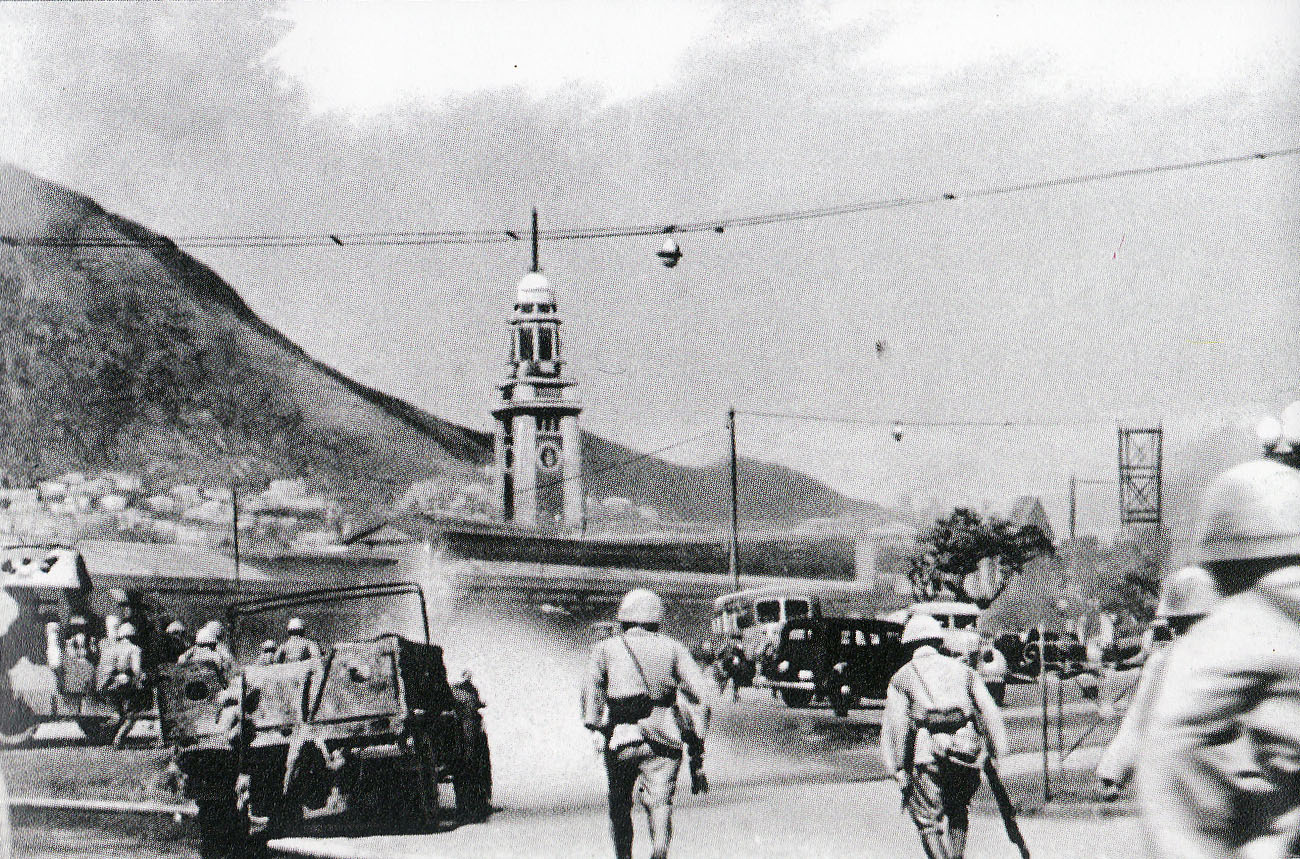
- Japanese troops take Tsim Sha Tsui
| Date | 8–25 December 1941 |
| Location | British Hong Kong |
| Result | Japanese victory |
| Territorial changes | Japanese occupation of Hong Kong |

Belligerents
| British Empire: United Kingdom; Hong Kong; India; Canada; China | Japan |

Commanders and leaders
| Mark Young (surrendered); Christopher Maltby (surrendered); Cedric Wallis (surrendered); John K. Lawson †; Chan Chak; Henry Hsu | Takashi Sakai; Tadamichi Kuribayashi; Tadayoshi Sano; Masaichi Niimi |

Strength
| 10,976–14,564 troops 5 planes 1 destroyer 4 gunboats 1 minelayer 8 MTBs | 26,928 troops 51 planes 1 cruiser 3 destroyers 4 torpedo boats 3 gunboats |

Casualties and losses
| 1,560–2,278 killed or missing 2,300 wounded 10,947 captured (Note: British 5,072, Canadian 1,689, Indian 3,829, others 357); 1 destroyer captured 4 gunboats sunk 1 minelayer sunk 3 MTBs sunk 5 planes lost | 675 killed 2,079 wounded 2 planes damaged |
- Civilian casualties: 4,000 killed 3,000 severely wounded (Note: Figures taken from Selwyn Selwyn-Clarke, the Director of Medical Services in Hong Kong.)

The Battle of Hong Kong (8–25 December 1941), also known as the Defence of Hong Kong and the Fall of Hong Kong, was one of the first battles of the Pacific War in World War II. On the same morning as the attack on Pearl Harbor, forces of the Empire of Japan attacked the British Crown colony of Hong Kong around the same time that Japan declared war on Britain. The Hong Kong garrison consisted of British, Indian and Canadian units, the Auxiliary Defence Units, and the Hong Kong Volunteer Defence Corps (HKVDC).

Of the three territories of Hong Kong, the defenders abandoned the two mainland territories of Kowloon and New Territories within a week. Less than two weeks later, with their last territory Hong Kong Island untenable, the colony surrendered. The fall of the city is regarded as Black Christmas as it marked the beginning of a brutal occupation by Japan that would last until its liberation in the summer of 1945.

== Background ==
Britain first thought of Japan as a threat with the ending of the Anglo-Japanese Alliance in 1921, a threat that increased throughout the 1930s with the escalation of the Second Sino-Japanese War as well as the Japanese invasion of French Indochina. On 21 October 1938, the Japanese occupied Canton (Guangzhou) and Hong Kong was surrounded. British defence studies concluded that Hong Kong would be extremely hard to defend in the event of a Japanese attack, but in the mid-1930s work began on improvements to defences including along the Gin Drinkers' Line. By 1940, the British determined to reduce the Hong Kong Garrison to only a symbolic size. Air Chief Marshal Sir Robert Brooke-Popham, the Commander-in-Chief of the British Far East Command argued that limited reinforcements could allow the garrison to delay a Japanese attack, gaining time elsewhere. Winston Churchill and the general staff named Hong Kong as an outpost, and decided against sending more troops. In September 1941, they reversed their decision and argued that additional reinforcements would provide a military deterrent against the Japanese and reassure Chinese leader Chiang Kai-shek that Britain was serious about defending the colony.

The plan for the defence of Hong Kong was that a delaying action would be fought in the New Territories and Kowloon peninsula to allow the destruction of vital infrastructure and stores there. The Gin Drinker's Line was expected to hold out for at least three weeks, following which all defenders would withdraw to Hong Kong Island which would be defended and use of the harbour denied until reinforcements could arrive from Singapore or the Philippines.

According to the history manual of the United States Military Academy: "Japanese control of Canton, Hainan Island, French Indo-China, and Formosa virtually sealed the fate of Hong Kong well before the firing of the first shot". The British military in Hong Kong grossly underestimated the capabilities of the Japanese forces and downplayed assessments that the Japanese posed a serious threat as 'unpatriotic' and 'insubordinate'.

US Consul Robert Ward, the highest ranking US official posted to Hong Kong in the period preceding the outbreak of hostilities, offered a first-hand explanation for the rapid collapse of defences in Hong Kong by saying that the local British community had insufficiently prepared itself or the Chinese populace for war. He highlighted the prejudiced attitudes held by those governing the Crown Colony of Hong Kong: "several of them (the British rulers) said frankly that they would rather turn the island over to the Japanese rather than to turn it over to the Chinese, by which they meant rather than employ Chinese to defend the colony they would surrender it to the Japanese".

Colonel Reynolds Condon, a US Army assistant military attaché who witnessed the battle and was taken prisoner by the Japanese, wrote up his observations on military preparedness before the commencement of hostilities and on the execution of operations thereafter.

== Order of battle ==
=== Allied order of battle ===
| Strengths of all personnel mobilised at Hong Kong Garrison on 8 December 1941 | 14,564 |
|---|---|
| British | 3,652 |
| Local Colonial | 2,428 |
| Indian | 2,254 |
| Auxiliary Defence Units | 2,112 |
| Hong Kong Volunteer Defence Corps | 1,787 |
| Canadian | 1,982 |
| Nursing Detachment | 136 |

==== Indian Army ====
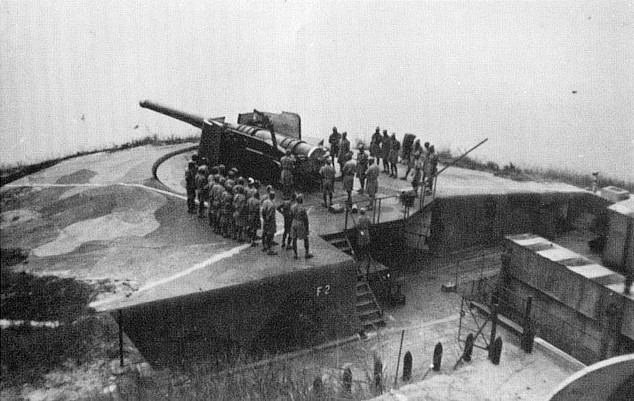
Indian gunners manning a 9.2-inch naval artillery gun at Mount Davis Battery on Hong Kong Island

The 5/7th Battalion, Rajput Regiment took up garrison at Hong Kong in June 1937 followed by the 2/14th Battalion, Punjab Regiment in November 1940. Indian troops were also incorporated within several overseas regiments, for example the Hong Kong Singapore Royal Artillery Regiment which had Indian (Sikh) gunners. The Hong Kong Mule Corps was staffed almost entirely by Dogras and Punjabi Muslims. Medical personnel from the Indian Medical Service tended to those injured in combat. Ex-servicemen from India serving as security guards in Hong Kong also suffered "appallingly huge" casualties.

==== Hong Kong and Singapore Royal Artillery ====
Coastal defence batteries, including those at Stonecutters Island, Pak Sha Wan, Lyemun fort, Saiwan, Mount Collinson, Mount Parker, Belchers, Mount Davis, Jubilee Hill, Bokara, and Stanley, provided artillery support for ground operations until they were put out of action or they surrendered. Hong Kong and Singapore Royal Artillery, which was raised with troops recruited from Undivided India, also suffered heavy casualties during the Battle of Hong Kong and are commemorated with names inscribed on panels at the entrance to Sai Wan War Cemetery: 144 killed, 45 missing and 103 wounded.

==== Canadian Army (C Force) ====
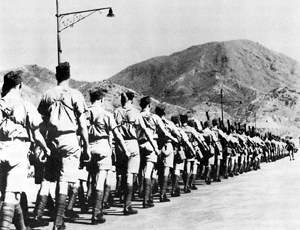
Three weeks before the battle, a Canadian military contingent arrived to reinforce the garrison

In late 1941, the British government accepted an offer by the Canadian Government to send a battalion of the Royal Rifles of Canada (from Quebec) and one of the Winnipeg Grenadiers (from Manitoba) and a brigade headquarters (1,975 personnel) to reinforce the Hong Kong garrison. "C Force", as it was known, arrived on 16 November on board the troopship Awatea and the armed merchant cruiser HMCS Prince Robert. A total of 96 officers, two Auxiliary Services supervisors and 1,877 other ranks disembarked. Included were two medical officers and two nurses (supernumerary to the regimental medical officers), two Canadian Dental Corps officers with assistants, three chaplains and a detachment of the Canadian Postal Corps. A soldier of the Royal Canadian Army Medical Corps (RCAMC) had stowed away and was sent back to Canada.

The Royal Rifles had served only in the Dominion of Newfoundland and New Brunswick, prior to posting to Hong Kong. The Winnipeg Grenadiers had been deployed to Jamaica. Few Canadian soldiers had field experience, but were nearly fully equipped. However, the battalions had only two anti-tank rifles and no ammunition for 2-inch and 3-inch mortars or signal pistols. These were intended to be supplied after they arrived in Hong Kong. The C Force didn't receive its vehicles, as the US merchant ship San Jose carrying them was, at the outbreak of the Pacific War, diverted to Manila, in the Philippine Islands, at the request of the US Government.

==== Royal Navy ====
The Royal Navy presence at Hong Kong was little more than a token display of defence, with three World War I vintage destroyers, four river gunboats, a new but almost unarmed minelayer and the 2nd Motor Torpedo Boat Flotilla.

==== Royal Marines ====
There were 40 Royal Marines attached to HMS Tamar (a shore station). When the battle began, the Royal Marines fought against Japanese forces in Magazine Gap, alongside HKVDC and Royal Engineers. They also manned machine guns on Mount Cameron. Commanding officer, Major Giles RM instructed his men to defend the island "to the last man and last round".

==== Royal Air Force ====
The Royal Air Force station at Hong Kong's Kai Tak Airport (RAF Kai Tak) had only five aeroplanes: two Supermarine Walrus amphibious aircraft and three outdated Vickers Vildebeest torpedo-reconnaissance bombers, flown and serviced by seven officers and 108 airmen. An earlier request for a fighter squadron had been rejected and the nearest fully operational RAF base with fighters (two RAAF squadrons with Brewster F2A Buffalo) was in Kota Bharu, Malaya, nearly 2,250 km (1,400 mi) away.

==== Other forces ====
The Chinese Military Mission to Hong Kong, initiated in 1938, was headed by Rear Admiral Andrew Chan and his aide Lieutenant Commander Henry Hsu. It had the objective of coordinating Chinese war aims with the British in Hong Kong. Working with the British police, Chan organized pro-British agents among the population and rooted out triad factions that were sympathetic to the Japanese.

A squad of Free French under Captain Rodéric Egal, of the Free French in Shanghai who happened to be in Hong Kong when the battle broke out, fought alongside the HKVDC at the North Point power station. They were all World War I veterans (as were the local HKVDC) and acquitted themselves well.

== Battle ==
=== New Territories and Kowloon ===
Map of the battle

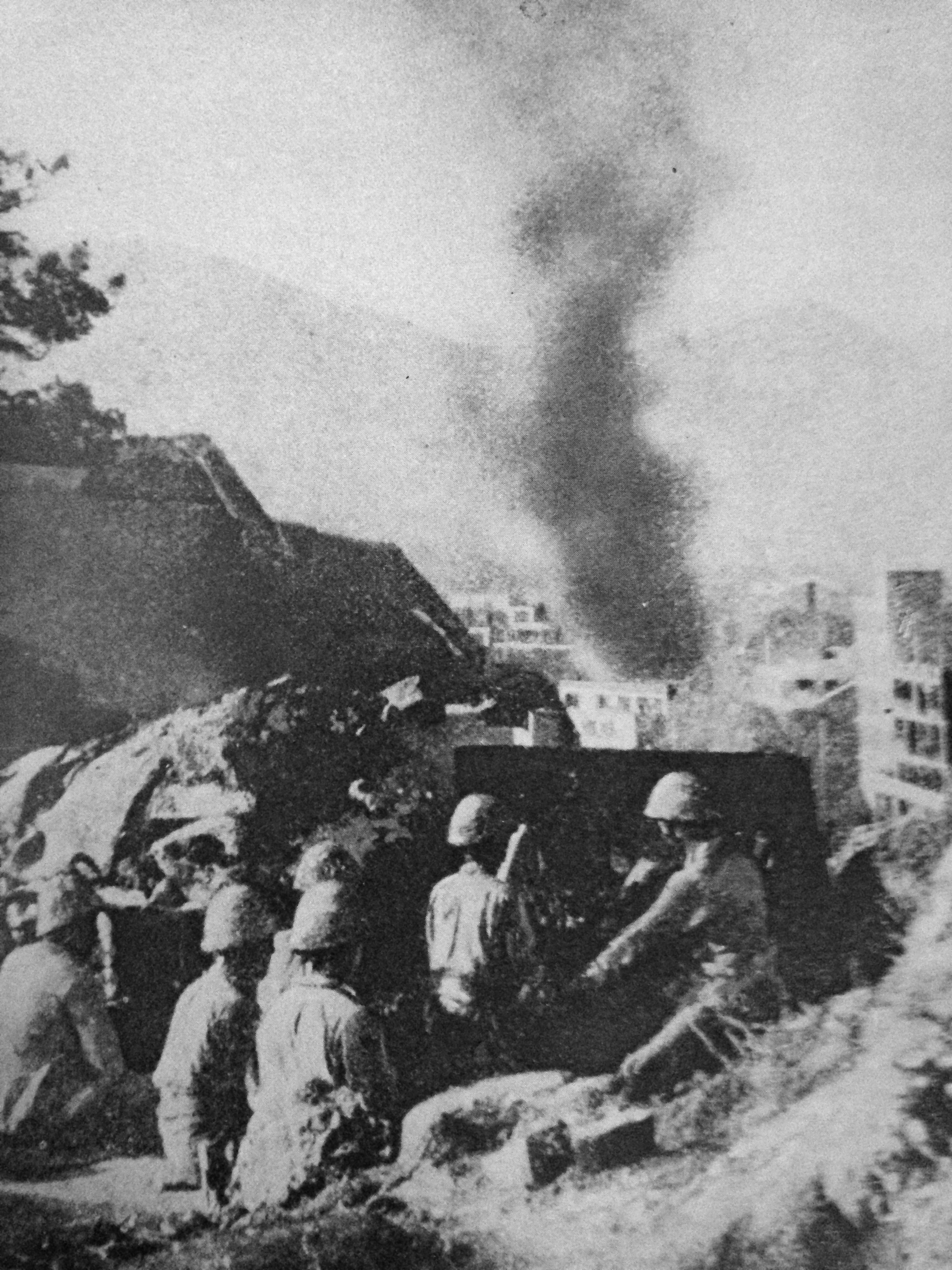
Japanese artillery firing at Hong Kong

Defending the New Territories was the 2nd Battalion, Royal Scots in the west, the 2/14th Punjab in the center and the 5/7th Rajput in the east. In front of them was a thin screen of 2/14th Punjab infantry supported by four Bren Gun Carriers and two armoured cars and engineers at Sheung Shui and Tai Po. At 04:45 on 8 December 1941 (Hong Kong Time), roughly 2.5 hours after the Attack on Pearl Harbor (which happened at 07:49 Hawaii Time or 02:19 Hong Kong Time the next day because of International Date Line) Radio Tokyo announced that war was imminent and General Maltby and Governor Young were informed. At 05:00 the engineers detonated their charges destroying bridges on likely invasion routes.

Japanese forces had been assembling north of the Sham Chun River since the beginning of December. The Japanese attack began at 06:00 when the IJA 230th, 229th and 228th Regiments (arranged from west to east) crossed the Sham Chun River. In the west the 230th Regiment advanced towards Yuen Long, Castle Peak Bay and Tai Mo Shan. In the center, the 229th Regiment advanced from Sha Tau Kok towards Chek Nai Ping and across Tide Cove to Tai Shui Hang. In the east, the 228th Regiment crossed at Lok Ma Chau and Lo Wu and advanced towards Lam Tsuen and Needle Hill.

At 08:00, the Japanese bombed Kai Tak Airport. Two of the three Vickers Vildebeests and the two Supermarine Walruses were destroyed by 12 Japanese bombers. The attack also destroyed several civil aircraft including all but two of the aircraft used by the air unit of the Hong Kong Volunteer Defence Corps. The RAF and air unit personnel from then fought on as ground troops. The Pan Am flying boat Hong Kong Clipper was dive-bombed and destroyed. The Japanese also bombed Sham Shui Po Barracks causing minimal damage.

The first significant exchanges of fire were at 15:00 when the 2/14th Punjab engaged the IJA who had crossed into Laffan's Plain. 2/14th Punjab eliminated several IJA platoons at 18:30 just south of Tai Po and HKVDC armoured cars and Bren Gun Carriers also successfully engaged IJA forces. Despite these successes, the 2/14th Punjab withdrew towards Grassy Hill in the afternoon to avoid being outflanked and the IJA forces advanced down the Tai Po Road towards Sha Tin. Late that night all units were ordered to withdraw to the Gin Drinker's Line.

On 9 December, the 2nd Royal Scots held in the west, a reserve company of the 5/7th Rajputs moved forward to Smuggler's Ridge, the HKVDC held Fo Tan and the 2/14th Punjab held at Tide Cove. By 13:00 the IJA 228th Regiment had reached Needle Hill and its commander Colonel Doi was reconnoitring the Shing Mun Redoubt area of the Gin Drinker's Line which he found to be unprepared for an attack. Despite the area being outside of his regimental boundary he developed an attack plan and began moving his men into position. The redoubt was defended by A Company, 2nd Royal Scots supplemented by other units giving a total strength of three officers and 39 soldiers. The defenders and the nearby D Company, 5/7th Rajputs conducted patrols north of the redoubt and around Needle Hill but failed to detect the two IJA battalions in the area or the 150-man attacking force which had crossed the Jubilee Dam and was in position just below one of the redoubt's pillboxes. At 23:00 the defenders detected movement and opened fire as the IJA began their attack. As the Japanese progressively overran the complex of trenches and tunnels, many of the defenders found themselves locked in the redoubt's artillery observation post (OP). Pillbox 402 was destroyed by IJA sappers at 02:30 on the 10th and the rest of the 3/228th Regiment joined the assault moving through the redoubt and into the valley, running into the 5/7th Rajputs who were moving to support the redoubt. The 5/7th Rajputs forced the Japanese back toward the redoubt. The Japanese eventually blew open the OP, capturing the 15 survivors. Artillery at Stonecutter's Island and Mount Davis pounded the redoubt until 05:00, but apart from one position which held out until the afternoon the redoubt was lost. The IJA had only lost a mere two soldiers in the attack.

At 21:30 on the 9th, HMS Thanet and HMS Scout were ordered to leave Hong Kong for Singapore, successfully evading the IJN blockade. Only one destroyer, HMS Thracian, several gunboats and a flotilla of MTBs remained. Between 8 and 10 December, eight American plus a number of Chinese pilots of the China National Aviation Corporation (CNAC) and their crews flew 16 sorties between Kai Tak Airport and landing fields in Nanxiong and Chongqing (Chungking), the wartime capital of the Republic of China. (Note: Articles in the New York Times and the Chicago Daily of 15 December 1941, the pilots were Charles L. Sharp, Hugh L. Woods, Harold A. Sweet, William McDonald, Frank L. Higgs, Robert S. Angle, P. W. Kessler and S. E. Scott.) The crew evacuated 275 people, including Soong Ching-ling, the widow of Sun Yat-sen and the Minister of Finance H. H. Kung.

On 10 December, the IJA 228th Regiment continued to move troops into the Shing Mun Redoubt while sending out small patrols along the rest of the line but otherwise failed to capitalize on their success. Maltby saw the loss of the redoubt as a disaster that undermined the entire defensive line and the 2nd Royal Scots were ordered to counterattack at dawn on the 11th, but their commander Lieutenant Colonel S. White refused on the basis that it had no chance of success.

At dawn on the 11th, the IJA 228th Regiment attacked Golden Hill and was engaged by the 5/7th Rajputs supported by fire from HMS Cicala. D Company, 2nd Royal Scots counterattacked and regained the hill. At midday, Maltby having decided that the New Territories and Kowloon were untenable and that the defence of Hong Kong island was the priority, ordered the evacuation of all his forces. Demolition works were carried out and the 2nd Royal Scots and supporting forces withdrew south to Sham Shui Po Barracks and Jordan pier, while the 5/7th Rajputs withdrew to Ma Yau Tong where they would hold Devil's Peak peninsula protecting the narrow Lye Moon Passage. The guns on Stonecutter's Island were destroyed and the base was abandoned that night.

Also on the morning of the 11th, the IJA landed on Lamma Island and were engaged by guns of Jubilee Battery and Aberdeen Battery. That afternoon the Japanese attempted a landing near Aberdeen Island (Ap Lei Chau) but were driven off by machine gun fire.

The 2/14th Punjab were to join the Rajputs on the Ma Yau Tong line, but during their march on the night of 11/12, December became split up, with one group reaching the Devil's Peak area while the other descended into Kai Tak and marched into Kowloon on the morning of the 12th, where they were engaged by the IJA 3/320th Regiment which had infiltrated into the area. The Punjabis fought their way down to Tsim Sha Tsui and were evacuated by Star Ferry. HMS Tamar was scuttled in the harbour to prevent its use by the Japanese. On the night of the 12th the 5/7th Rajputs withdrew from Ma Yau Tong further down the Devil's Peak peninsula and at 04:00 on the 13th they began boarding boats to take them to Hong Kong island with the evacuation being completed by the morning of 13 December 1941.

=== Hong Kong Island ===
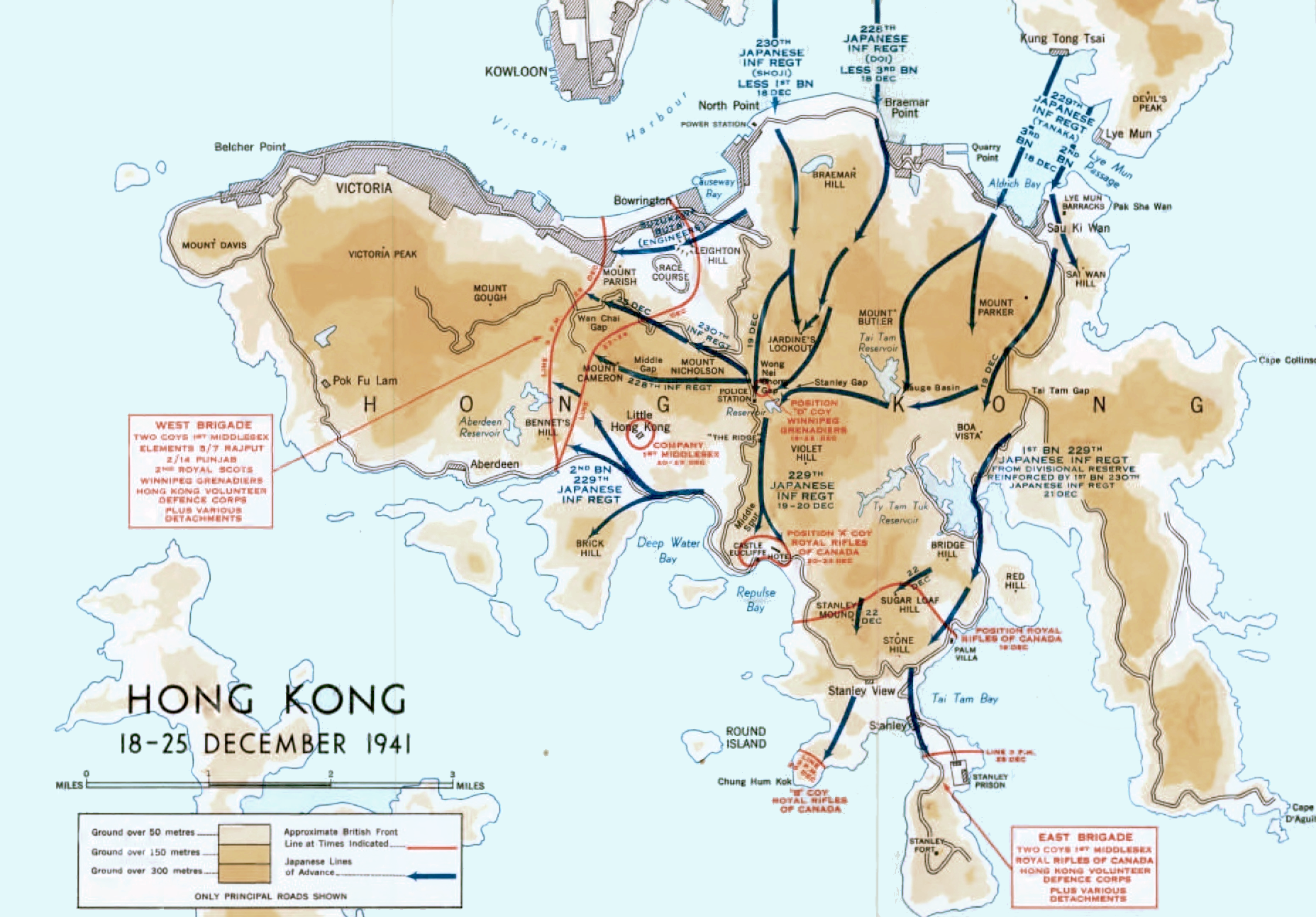
Map of the battle of Hong Kong Island

Maltby organized the defence of the island, splitting it between an East Brigade and a West Brigade. The West Brigade commanded by Brigadier John K. Lawson had its headquarters at the top of Wong Nai Chung Gap, a strategic passage between the north and south of the island. The West Brigade comprised the 2/14th Punjab covering the shoreline from Causeway Bay to Belcher's Point; the Winnipeg Grenadiers defended the southwest corner of the island and Lawson's headquarters; the Middlesex Regiment was dispersed across 72 pillboxes along the island shoreline; the 2nd Royal Scots reinforced by the HKVDC were held in reserve at Wanchai Gap; and the HKVDC had companies located at High West, Mt Davis, Pinewood Battery, Magazine Gap, Jardine's Lookout and Aberdeen Naval Base. The East Brigade commanded by Brigadier Cedric Wallis had its headquarters at Tai Tam Gap. The East Brigade comprised the 5/7th Rajputs holding pillboxes along the northeast shoreline with a company and their headquarters in the hills behind Taikoo Dockyard and a reserve company in Tai Hang; the Royal Rifles of Canada defended the island's northeast all the way around to Stanley; and two companies of the HKVDC were located at Tai Tam and Pottinger Gap.

On the morning of 13 December, a Japanese delegation crossed the harbour to offer terms of surrender, which were rejected. The Japanese then began an artillery bombardment of Hong Kong Island disabling one of the 9.2-inch guns on Mt Davis and hitting Belcher's Fort in Pok Fu Lam. On the 14th Japanese artillery destroyed a 3-inch gun at Mt Davis. On the 15th Japanese artillery moved to target pillboxes and other defensive positions along the shoreline. The Japanese mounted six air attacks on positions on the west of the island and bomb damage forced the abandonment of Pinewood Battery.

On the morning of the 17th, the Japanese again offered terms of surrender which were rejected. That night a reconnaissance team from the IJA 3/229th Regiment successfully explored the Taikoo area. The IJA had moved its forces closer to Hong Kong Island with the 23rd Army headquarters at Tai Po and the 38th Division near Kai Tak.

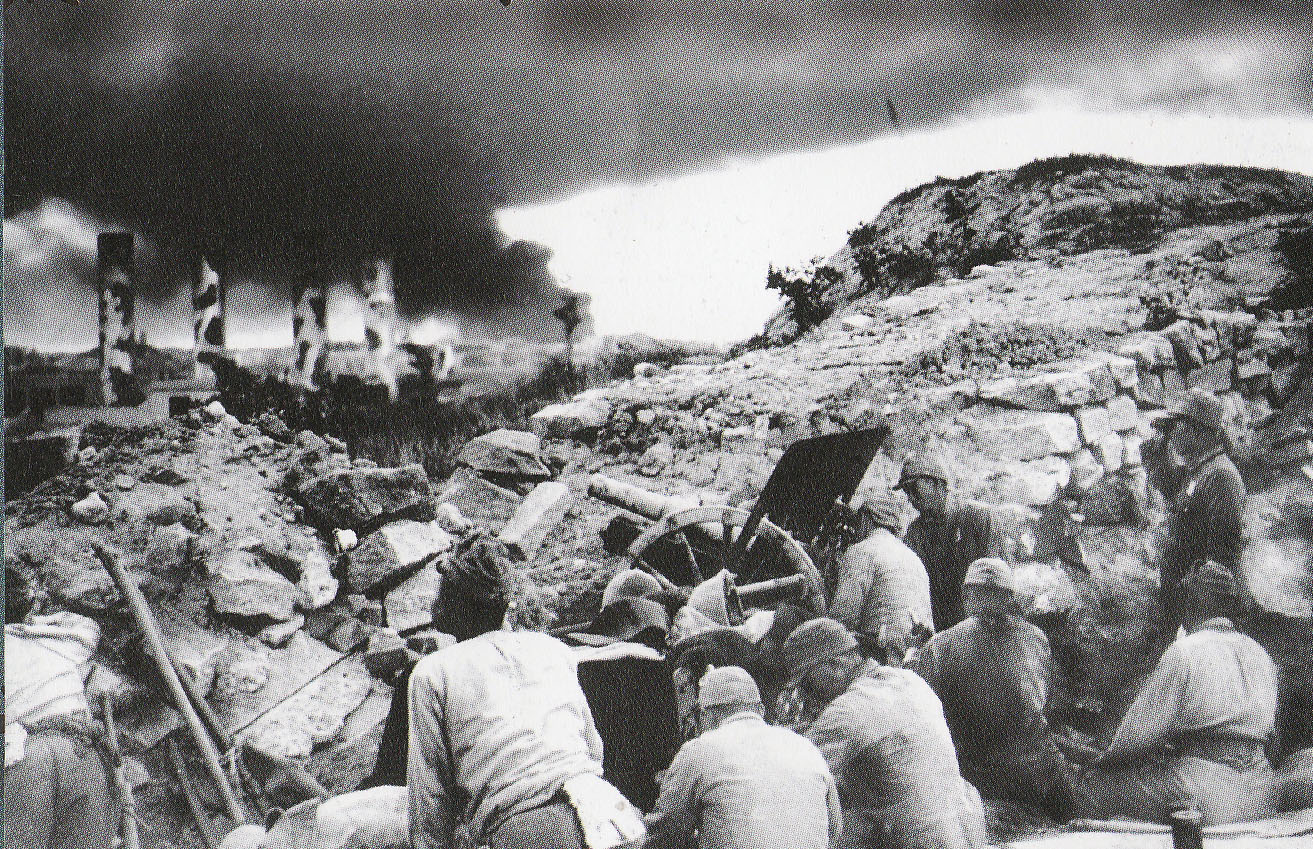
Japanese artillery in North Point

On 18 December, the Japanese bombardment of the island shoreline increased and the oil storage tanks were hit. The IJA forces were organized into two assault units: the west assault unit comprised the 228th and 230th Regiments and would leave from the Kai Tak area, and the east assault unit comprised the 229th Regiment (less 1/229th held as Divisional reserve) and would leave from the Devil's Peak area. The attack order was issued at 18:00 and at 20:00 the first wave from the 2/228th and 3/230th began paddling towards the Taikoo Dockyard and sugar refinery under cover of artillery fire. As they approached the shore the boats were illuminated by searchlights and fired on by the 5/7th Rajputs. The boats scattered and both battalion commanders were wounded so Colonel Doi crossing with the second wave assumed command of the assault. At 21:40 the artillery barrage moved to targets further inshore and at 21:45 the 3/230th landed at North Point, followed by the 2/228th. At 21:38 the 2/229th landed at Sai Wan and the 3/229th landed at Aldrich Bay. By midnight all six IJA battalions were ashore but were held up on the beaches by barbed wire, fire from the 5/7th Rajputs and the general confusion of night operations. The Japanese eventually moved inshore overwhelming the Rajputs, bypassing or destroying the strong points as they generally headed towards the high ground. Maltby, believing that the landing only comprised two battalions and was a diversion for a direct assault across the harbor on Victoria, sent minimal reinforcements to block any IJA movement west towards Victoria and five HKVDC armored cars to protect the East Brigade headquarters. The 2/230th moved west towards Victoria but was stopped by an HKVDC, Free French and miscellaneous force in the North Point Power Station led by Major John Johnstone Paterson. Radioing for assistance, Maltby sent an HKVDC armoured car and a platoon from the 1st Middlesex, but they were ambushed on the way and only nine men made it to the station. The Japanese then directed artillery fire on the station and the surviving defenders withdrew at 01:45 continuing to fight the Japanese on Electric Road and King's Road until all were killed or captured.

In the early hours of 19 December, the IJA 3/229th moved uphill towards Mt Parker, while the 2/229th moved southeast towards the Lyemun fortifications. The 2/229th engaged a platoon of the Royal Rifles sent to check on A Company of the Rajputs and then quickly overwhelmed the Fort's garrison. The 2/229th then captured Sai Wan Battery killing six gunners from the HKVDC 5th Anti-Aircraft Battery and then proceeded to bayonet 20 prisoners, with only two surviving. C Company, Royal Rifles attempted to retake the Victorian era Sai Wan Fort with two platoons but were unable to scale the walls and lost nine killed. A company from the 2/229th entered the Salesian Mission in Shau Kei Wan, which was being used as a dressing station and they proceeded to kill all those inside, however, four men survived. According to Captain Stanley Martin Banfill of the Royal Rifles, who witnessed his men being executed, the leading Japanese officer stated that "Order is all captives must die". The rest of the 2/229th were engaged by C Company, Royal Rifles who inflicted heavy casualties, but the Japanese were able to move past the Canadians while also inflicting heavy losses, forcing C Company to withdraw and leaving only A Company on Mt Parker. At 03:00 a platoon from D Company was sent to reinforce Mt Parker, but they became lost in the dark and only arrived at 07:30 to find over 100 Japanese on Mt Parker and A Company withdrawing and so Mt Parker was abandoned to the Japanese. In addition to East Brigade's infantry losses, the coastal batteries at Cape D'Aguilar and Cape Collinson were abandoned, while several of 965 Battery's guns were destroyed in error or left to the Japanese. Wallis withdrew his headquarters from Tai Tam Gap to Stanley.

In the West Brigade area, Lawson sent three platoons from the Winnipeg Grenadiers forward to block the IJA advance from their landing sites, deploying one platoon on each of Jardine's Lookout and Mt Butler and one forward on Wong Nei Chung Gap Road. Meanwhile, the 3/230th was advancing along Sir Cecil's Ride on the side of Jardine's Lookout, the 2/230th towards Jardine's Lookout, the 2/228th advanced on the other side of Jardine's Lookout, the 1/228th moved through Quarry Gap and the 3/229th advanced up Tai Tam Reservoir Road. The Japanese swept aside the weak infantry screens and while pillboxes inflicted casualties the Japanese were able to bypass such strong points and captured Jardine's Lookout. At 06:20 Pillbox PB1 occupied by No. 3 Company, HKVDC fired on an estimated 400 IJA advancing along Sir Cecil's Ride. Several IJA battalions advancing along the catchwaters captured the anti-aircraft positions on Tai Tam Reservoir Road east of Wong Nei Chung Gap, after a heavy firefight. In the early morning Lawson brought forward A Company, Winnipeg Grenadiers to recapture Jardine's Lookout and they then successfully retook Jardine's Lookout, but only for a couple of hours before the hill fell after an intense artillery bombardment and frontal assaults by IJA 230th and 228th Regiment. The IJA forces descended from Wong Nei Chung Reservoir and attacked the police station and Postbridge House at the summit of Wong Nei Chung Gap. By 07:00 the 3/230th closed in on the West Brigade headquarters, Maltby sent A Company, 2nd Royal Scots to reinforce them approaching Wong Nei Chung Gap Road, but only 15 men made it through while a group of sailors approaching from the south up Repulse Bay Road were also ambushed. The 3/230th cleared out positions south and east of the headquarters despite fire from HKSRA artillery in Happy Valley. At 10:00 Lawson radioed that his headquarters were surrounded and that he was "going outside to shoot it out"; he and his entire command group were then hit by Japanese machine gun fire from across the gap and Lawson died of blood loss on the hill behind his bunker. By midday only elements of D Company, Winnipeg Grenadiers and British and Chinese engineers held positions above the West Brigade Headquarters, while Pillboxes PB 1 and PB 2 on the lower slopes of Jardine's Lookout continued to resist.

At 08:45, six MTBs assembled off Green Island and then moved east in pairs into Hong Kong Harbour to attack boats transporting IJA soldiers across the harbour. As they neared Kowloon Bay MTB 7 attacked three Japanese boats, sinking two and damaging others before being disabled by Japanese fire and towed out by MTB 2. MTB 9 damaged a further four Japanese boats.

At 13:30, Maltby issued Operation Order No. 6 for a general counterattack to commence at 15:00. A and D Companies, 2/14th Punjab was to attack east towards North Point to relieve the HKVDC still holding out there, however, the order never reached them. Headquarters Company, Winnipeg Grenadiers, the rest of 2/14th Punjab and the 2nd Royal Scots were to attack east from Middle Gap towards Wong Nei Chung Gap, but the Royal Scots were late and so the HQ Company moved along the front of Mt Nicholson separately. D Company, 2nd Royal Scots and D Company, Winnipeg Grenadiers were then ordered to advance up Wong Nei Chung Gap Road but were hit by Japanese fire from Jardine's Lookout and were pinned down for the rest of the day. By 18:00 PB1 and PB2 were abandoned. At 22:00 a Japanese counterattack on Mt Butler was repulsed by A Company, Winnipeg Grenadiers.

At 02:00 on the 20th, the Royal Scots attacked the police station at the top of Wong Nei Chung Gap, but were repulsed as was another attack an hour later. An attack on Jardine's Lookout by C Company, 2nd Royal Scots also failed. Maltby ordered the Headquarters Company, Winnipeg Grenadiers to advance on Wong Nei Chung Gap, but they suffered heavy casualties before being stopped 300m short of the road, they then moved back along Black's Link and encountered approximately 500 unprepared Japanese and proceeded to attack them. At 15:00, after exhausting their ammunition, A Company, Winnipeg Grenadiers on Mt Butler surrendered to the Japanese, however in a final exchange of fire Sergeant-major John Robert Osborn smothered a Japanese grenade with his body, an action for which he was later posthumously awarded the Victoria Cross. By 17:45 elements of the HKSRA under Major, Edward De Vere were ordered to attack the police station. The attack was launched at 22:00 supported by two armoured cars. This attack was successful and the unit managed to recapture the police station, but only for a few hours until the Japanese captured the police station using reinforcements from Stanley Gap (the old name for the Tai Tam Reservoir Road.)

The new West Brigade commander Colonel H.B. Rose of the HKVDC developed a plan to retake the Gap using the 2nd Royal Scots and the Winnipeg Grenadiers. B Company, Winnipeg Grenadiers was brought from Pok Fu Lam in the afternoon but was unable to locate the 2nd Royal Scots who had inexplicably moved off the eastern slopes of Mt Nicholson. This lapse allowed Colonel Doi to order three companies of the 1/228th to occupy Mt Nicholson in the afternoon under cover of a rain storm. B Company, Winnipeg Grenadiers moved in two columns in the dark and rain around the north and south of Mt Nicholson, meeting up above the gap which was to be their starting point for the next day's attack. However, they were then engaged by the Japanese and all their officers and NCOs and 29 men became casualties and they retreated around the north of Mt Nicholson.

Elsewhere on the 20th, the 2nd and 3rd battalions, 229th Regiment had advanced down the Tytam Road and captured the X roads, Red Hill and Bridge Hill. They captured the 4.5-inch battery at Red Hill, which was abandoned the previous day. A handful of British civilians who were at the nearby pumping station were blindfolded and bayonetted at the beach in front of the pumping station. Meanwhile, the Japanese in the area south of Tai Tam Reservoir and into the hills above Repulse Bay where they encountered A Company, Royal Rifles and two HKVDC platoons preparing to attack Wong Hei Chung Gap from Violet Hill. Maltby sent A Company, 2/14th Punjab to support the forces in Repulse Bay, but they were engaged by a Japanese force on Shouson Hill and were forced to retreat with their commander Colonel Kidd killed in the action. Further east the 1/229th and 2/228th advanced from Tai Tam and Sai Wan towards Stanley. HMS Cicala which had been providing gunfire support in Deep Water Bay was hit by Japanese bombers and sank in the Lamma Channel.

At 09:15 on the 21st, Wallis launched a new attack into Tai Tam to try to reach Wong Nei Chung Gap, with D Company, Royal Rifles, No. 1 Company, HKVDC, a medium machine gun section and two Bren Gun Carriers advancing from Stanley Mound. They were soon hit by Japanese mortar fire from Red Hill and then engaged by infantry from 1/229th and 1/230th on Bridge Hill and Red Hill. By 1400 hours, the Commonwealth forces managed to capture the summit of Bridge Hill, the X roads and the summit of Red Hill. The Japanese quickly rushed reinforcements from Tai Tam Gap, such as two Type 94 Tankettes. These tankettes were fired upon by a British machine gun on Bridge Hill, and the tankettes retreated to Tai Tam Gap. Even with this success, by 17:00 all the officers in the Commonwealth counterattacking force had been wounded and the force withdrew toward Stanley. On the north shore elements of the 230th Regiment pushed west reaching Victoria Park, while Japanese artillery bombarded HMS Tamar. Maltby ordered a further attack on Wong Nei Chung Gap by a force comprising four platoons, but when the commander saw the IJA forces in the area he cancelled the attack.

On the 22nd, the 2/229th moved west from Shouson Hill and captured PB14 on the shore of Deepwater Bay from elements of the 1st Middlesex and then proceeded to behead all the prisoners. Two battalions of the 229th attacked the Repulse Bay Hotel while the 1/229th and 1/230th pushed the remnants of the East Brigade back into the Stanley peninsula. The East Brigade formed three defensive lines: the first line was composed of elements of the 1st Middlesex, three companies of the Royal Rifles and one company of the HKVDC supported by one 2-pounder gun; the second line at Stanley Village comprised two companies of the 1st Middlesex, a company of the HKVDC and the Stanley company of the HKVDC supported by two 18-pounder and 2-pounder guns; and at Stanley Fort were two HKVDC artillery batteries and two Royal Artillery batteries with two 18-pounder, two 3.7-inch and 9.2-inch and 6-inch coastal guns. On the north shore West Brigade forces struggled to hold the line from Causeway Bay, through Leighton Hill, Happy Valley and Mount Cameron down to Bennett's Hill on the south of the island. At midday the Japanese attacked Stanley Mound and Sugarloaf Hill defended by units of the Royal Rifles, after repulsing several attacks, low ammunition forced the defenders to withdraw. The Japanese began their assault on the southern flank of Mt Cameron inflicting severe losses on B Company, 2/14th Punjab, but the penetration was stopped by a counterattack by B Company, 4/7th Rajputs. In the north, after an intensive artillery bombardment, the Japanese broke through the defensive line south of Leighton Hill at 22:00, forcing the defenders to start abandoning their positions and retreat west to avoid encirclement.

At 08:00 on the 23rd, the 5/7th Rajputs fell back leaving the 1st Middlesex units on Leighton Hill isolated and the Japanese bombarded them with mortar fire. Meanwhile, the remaining defenders on the north shore retreated west to Mount Gough. With the main water reservoirs now controlled by the IJA and with artillery damage to pipes, water supplies began to run out.

On the 24th, the Royal Rifles were withdrawn to the defensive lines at Stanley. The IJA forces attacked down the Tai Tam Road but were repulsed. A second attack began at 21:00 supported by three Type 94 tankettes, two of which were destroyed by a 2-pounder fire. The outer defensive line broke and No 2 Company HKVDC was forced back to Stanley Village with heavy losses. At midnight the Japanese penetrated the second defence line and entered the field hospital at St. Stephen's College and in the St. Stephen's College massacre tortured and killed a large number of injured soldiers, along with the medical staff. On the north shore the 230th Regiment advanced through Wanchai, meeting resistance at the China Fleet Club but this was soon overcome and the regiment advanced on the dockyard. In Happy Valley, the remnants of the 5/7th Rajputs were pushed back from the Happy Valley Racecourse, off Mount Parish and out of Wanchai Market.

=== Fall of Hong Kong ===
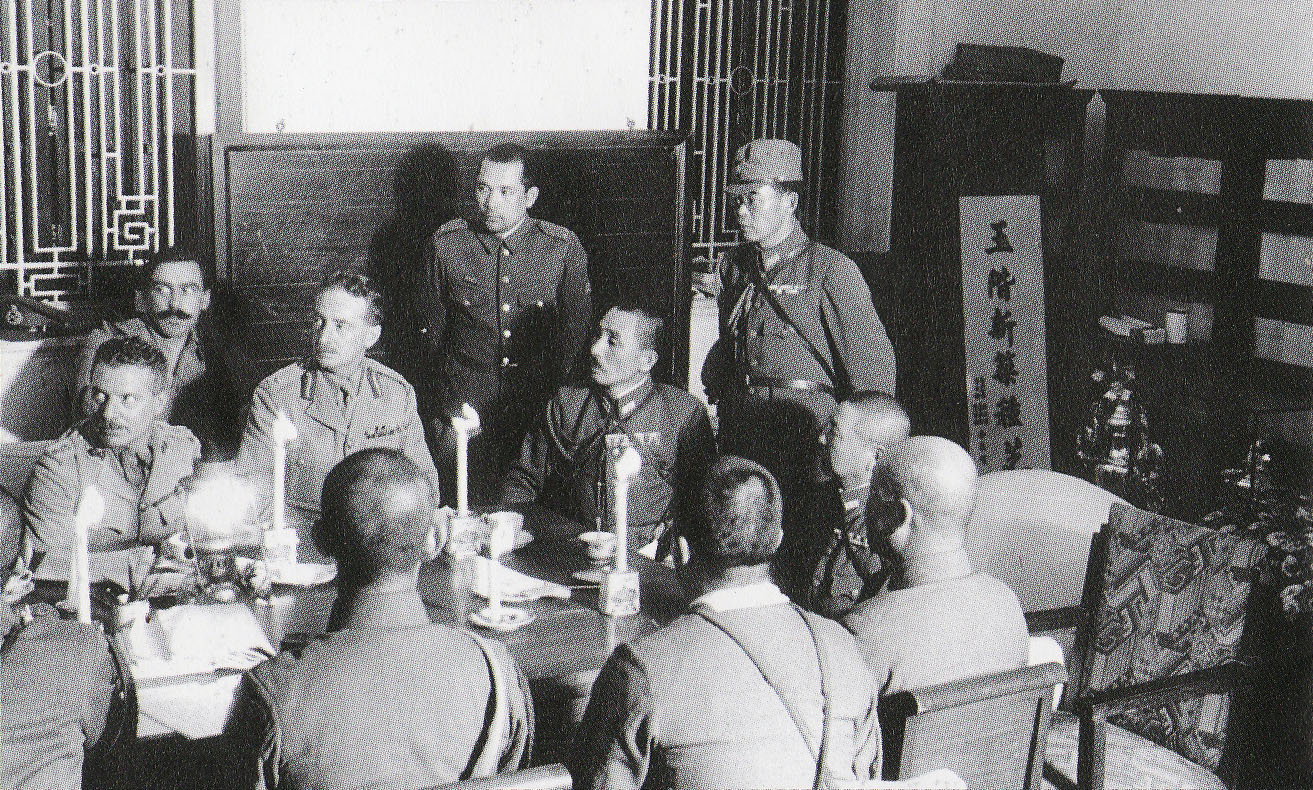
The surrender of British forces in Hong Kong, 25 December 1941

On Christmas morning, Young informed Chan of his intent to surrender. Chan intended to break out and was given command of the five remaining MTBs; 68 men, including Chan, Hsu, and David Mercer MacDougall were successfully evacuated to Mirs Bay where they contacted Nationalist guerrillas and were escorted to Huizhou. For this feat, Chan was made an honorary Knight Commander of the Order of the British Empire.

By the afternoon of 25 December 1941, it was clear that further resistance would be futile and at 15:30 Governor Young and General Maltby surrendered in person to General Sakai at the Japanese headquarters on the third floor of the Peninsula Hotel. At Stanley, Wallis refused to surrender without a written order and this was received by him at 02:30 on the 26th. Isolated pockets held out even longer, and the Central Ordnance Munitions Depot (known as "Little Hong Kong") surrendered on 27 December. This was the first occasion on which a British Crown Colony had surrendered to an invading force. The garrison had held out for 17 days. This day is known in Hong Kong as "Black Christmas".

== Aftermath ==
=== Casualties ===
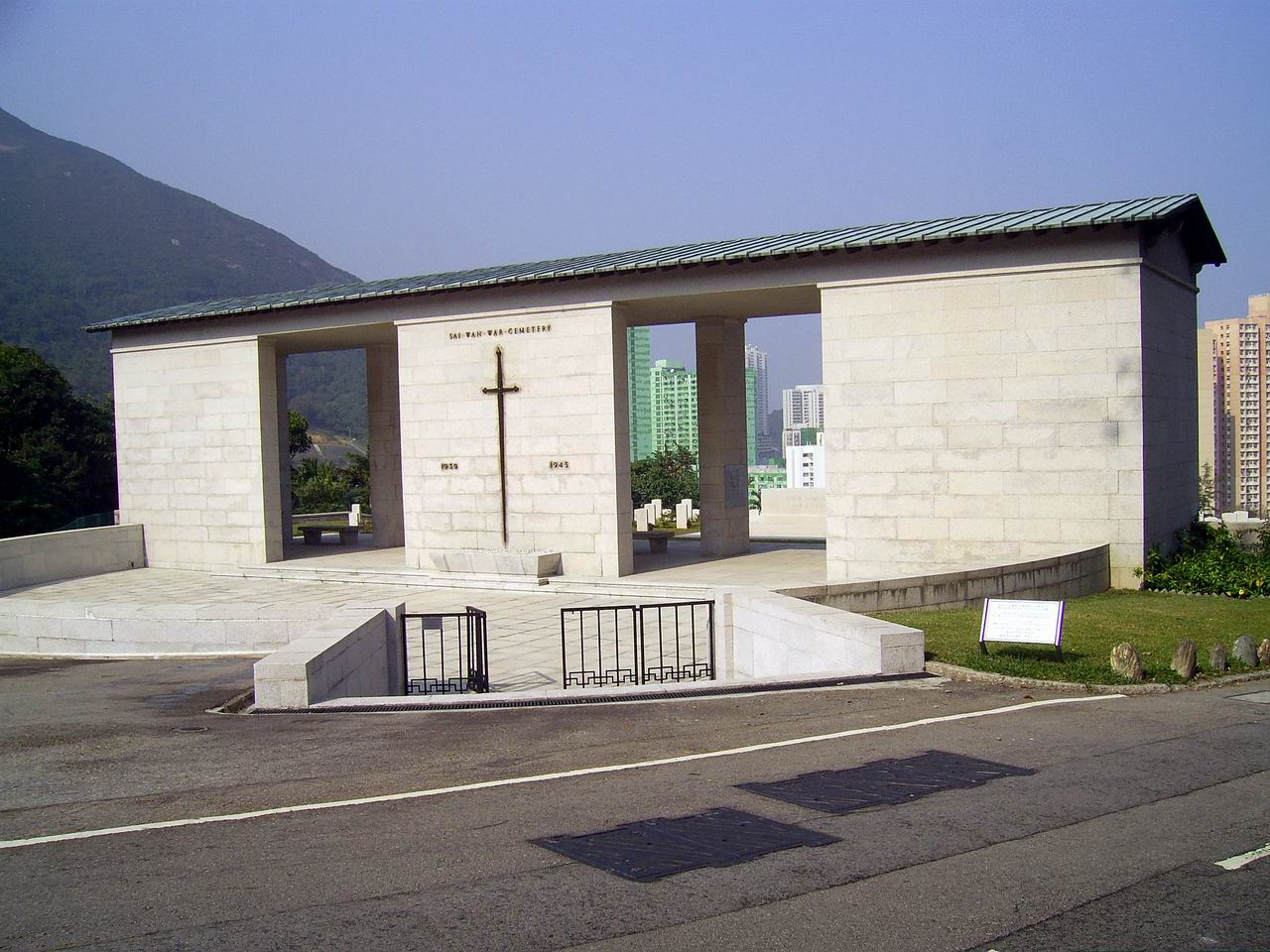
Sai Wan War Cemetery

The Japanese officially reported 675 men killed and 2,079 wounded; western estimates go as high as 1,895 dead and 6,000 casualties overall. Allied casualties were 1,111 men killed, 1,167 missing and 1,362 wounded (sources vary; other figures given include 1,045 killed, 1,068 missing and 2,300 wounded, as well as 1,560 killed or missing). Allied dead, including British, Canadian and Indian soldiers, were eventually interred at Sai Wan Military Cemetery and the Stanley Military Cemetery. Total battle casualties of "Indian Other Ranks" is given to be 1,164 out of a total of 3,893 military personnel from India who were garrisoned in Hong Kong. The 5/7 Rajput bore the heaviest losses recorded amongst the 6 combat regiments during the battle of Hong Kong: 156 killed in action or died from wounds, 113 missing, and 193 wounded. The 2/14 Punjab had 55 killed in action or died from wounds, 69 missing, and 161 wounded. C Force casualties in the battle were 23 officers and 267 other ranks killed or died of wounds, including five officers and 16 other ranks of the brigade headquarters, seven officers and 123 men of the Royal Rifles and 11 officers and 128 men of the Winnipeg Grenadiers. C Force also had 28 officers and 465 men wounded. Some of the dead were murdered by Japanese soldiers during or after surrender. Japanese soldiers committed a number of atrocities on 19 December, when the aid post at the Salesian Mission near Sau Ki Wan was overrun. A total of 1,528 soldiers, mainly Commonwealth (predominantly Indians and Canadians), are either buried or commemorated there. There are also graves of other Allied combatants who died in the region during the war, including some Dutch sailors who were re-interred in Hong Kong after the war.

At the end of February 1942, the Japanese government stated that numbers of prisoners of war in Hong Kong were: British 5,072, Canadian 1,689, Indian 3,829, others 357, a total of 10,947. They were sent to:

- Sham Shui Po POW Camp
- Argyle Street Camp for officers
- North Point Camp primarily for Canadians and Royal Navy
- Ma Tau Chung Camp for Indian soldiers
- Yokohama Camp in Japan
- Fukuoka Camp in Japan
- Osaka Camp in Japan

Of the Canadians captured during the battle, 267 subsequently perished in Japanese prisoner of war camps, mainly due to neglect and abuse. In December 2011, Toshiyuki Kato, Japan's parliamentary vice-minister for foreign affairs, apologised for the mistreatment to a group of Canadian veterans of the Battle of Hong Kong.

Civilians were interned at the Stanley Internment Camp. Initially, there were 2,400 internees although this number was reduced, by repatriations during the war. Interned persons who died and prisoners executed by the Japanese are buried in Stanley Military Cemetery.

=== Massacres and other war crimes ===
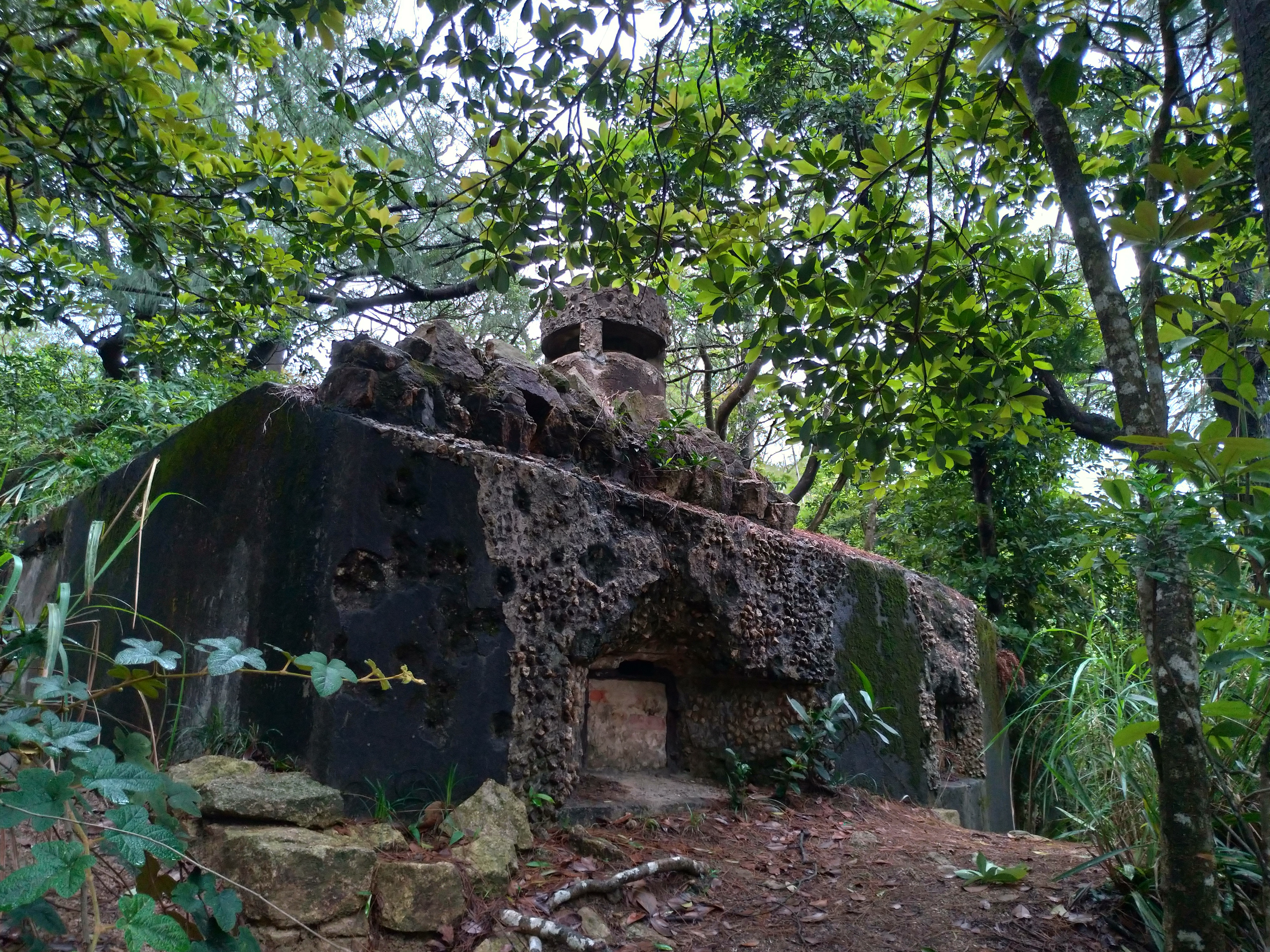
A British pillbox near Jardine's Lookout

The 23rd Army's conduct in Hong Kong was characterized by brutality, numerous and widespread war crimes were reported against both Allied servicemen, nurses, and civilians. An estimated 10,000 Hong Kong civilians were executed during the three years and eight months of occupation, while many others were tortured, raped, or mutilated. Like other prisoners of war captured by the Japanese, the 10,947 prisoners of war captured in Hong Kong were subjected to murder, torture (both physical and psychological), beatings, extrajudicial punishment, slavery, starvation rations and poor medical treatment.

==== Hong Kong Island ====
- Three captured persons were executed at Quarry Bay, including a female air raid warden named Ada Baldwin who was with the local Air Raid Precautions (ARP).
- After the fall of the medical station near the West Brigade command post, ten stretcher bearers of the St. John Ambulance within the station were killed, as well as a policeman and a medic from the Royal Army Medical Corps.
- Four men of A Company Winnipeg Grenadiers were bayoneted after the battle at Jardine's Lookout. One grenadier, Private Kilfoyle, was killed on the forced march to North Point, according to witnesses.
- Four men were killed in the so-called "Black Hole of Hong Kong", a mess hut at the Wongneichong AA Battery, including two Canadian officers.
- In the evening of 18–19 December 1941, surrendered gunners of the 5th Battery, Hong Kong Volunteer Defence Corps (HKVDC) and 5th Heavy Anti-Aircraft Regiment at Sai Wan AA Battery were murdered by Japanese soldiers of No. 6 Company, the 2nd Battalion, 229th Infantry Regiment. In total 28 are killed, some may have died in the fight for the position.
- In the morning of 19 December 1941, Japanese soldiers of the 2nd Battalion or 3rd Battalion, 229th Infantry Regiment murdered medical personnel and wounded soldiers who were captured at Salesian Mission, which was used as an emergency hospital. The Japanese soldiers attempted to kill all male prisoners of wars and released two female nurses. In total 16 were killed.
- From 19 to 20 December 1941, surrendered British and Commonwealth soldiers from various units were kept in a small shed near the anti-aircraft gun battery without food, water, and medical assistance. They were hit by shells and some were killed as the result in Wong Nai Chung Gap. The Japanese troops responsible for this probably came from the 230th and 229th regiments. In total at least 16 were killed.
- Around thirty civilians of different ethnicities were massacred at No. 42 Blue Pool Road on 22 December. When the soldiers of the 230th Infantry Regiment entered Blue Pool Road from the south, they murdered civilians, including local businessmen Lam Ming-fan and three male relatives of his family, as well a number of Ministry of Finance officials of the Nationalist Chinese government who took refuge in the houses along the road. Tang Shiu-kin, a prominent businessman and philanthropist who was at the same spot, survived the massacre.
- On 23 December 1941, British and Commonwealth soldiers from various units, led by Lt. Col. Robert MacPherson, attempted to surrender but were killed by Japanese soldiers of the No. 6 Company, 2nd Battalion of the 229th Infantry Regiment at the Ridge in Repulse Bay. At least 47 were killed and most of the killed prisoners of war were wounded soldiers. Among the dead was Major Charles Sydney Clarke of China Command HQ, two men of the 12th and 20th Coastal Regiments of the Royal Artillery (RA), six men of the Royal Army Service Corps (RASC) and two of the Royal Canadian Army Service Corps (RCASC), nineteen men of the Royal Army Ordnance Corps (RAOC) and three of the Royal Canadian Ordnance Corps (RCOC) and fourteen men of the RASC Company of the HKVDC.
- On 23 December 1941, wounded soldiers from various units were bayoneted at Overbays by Japanese soldiers of the 3rd Battalion, 229th Infantry Regiment; the Japanese troops also set fire on the building. The Japanese executed at least fourteen captives, men of the same units as at The Ridge but also including three Royal Rifles of Canada and an officer of the 1st Middlesex.
- Ride, who was present at the surrender, stated later that he saw fifty bodies lying by the road, including six Middlesex men among them. These men may have been some of those attached to the Hong Kong Chinese Regiment. The Commonwealth War Graves Commission report also states that five men of the Royal Air Force went missing near The Ridge on 20 December, perhaps captured and killed.
- On 23 December 1941, Canadian troops from A Company, Royal Rifles and troops from various units were murdered at Eucliff by soldiers of the 3rd Battalion, 229th Infantry Regiment after surrender. At least 7 were killed.
- Six men of the Middlesex were killed defending PB 14 at Deepwater Bay Ride (Lyon Light). Most of them were killed after capture via beheading.
- Another 36 known victims cannot be placed precisely at one of the three locations (Ridge, Overbays, Eucliffe).
- In the evening of 24 December, Japanese soldiers of the 229th and 230th regiments stormed the Marynoll Mission position; resistance continued until dawn. At least six officers and a number of other men were killed after capture at Maryknoll Mission. Four members of the 8th Coastal Regiment RA may have been killed here as well; estimates of the number of men murdered vary from 11 to 16.
- In the evening of 24 December 1941, soldiers of the 1st Battalion, 229th Regiment stormed the field hospital of St. Stephen's College, murdering the medical personnel and the wounded soldiers. Nurses were raped and then murdered. This was the largest-scale war crime against the garrison during the battle.
- Twelve nurses were raped at the emergency hospital at Happy Valley racecourse on 25 December.
- From 25 to 28 December 1941, Japanese soldiers from various units (possibly include rear-area troops) looted and raped the civilians in Causeway Bay; they were sometimes stopped by Japanese Gendarmerie but there were not enough of them to stop the rampage.

==== Kowloon ====
- One private (John Payne) and an Australian were captured by the Japanese in Kowloon on 12 December and executed.

==== New Territories ====
- From 8–9 December 1941, Japanese soldiers from various units passed through the Fanling Orphanage and looted the place; nurses and amahs were raped and brutalized. At least one baby was killed during the process. The case, however, was not thoroughly investigated and the perpetuators were not identified and tried.

=== Subsequent operations ===
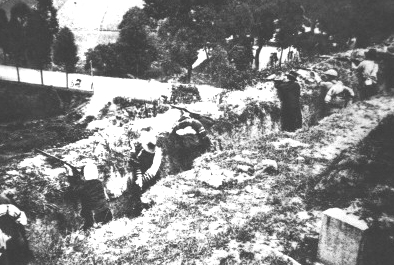
Dongjiang guerillas fighting in trenches

Isogai Rensuke became the first Japanese governor of Hong Kong. This ushered in the three years and eight months of Imperial Japanese administration.

The 38th Infantry Division departed Hong Kong in January 1942. The Hong Kong Defence Force was established during the same month, and was the main Japanese military unit in Hong Kong throughout the occupation.

During the over three and a half years of occupation by the Japanese, an estimated 10,000 Hong Kong civilians were executed, while many others were tortured, raped, or mutilated. The local population in the rural New Territories, a mix of Hakka, Cantonese and other Han Chinese groups, waged a guerrilla war with limited success. The resistance groups were known as the Gangjiu and Dongjiang forces. The Japanese razed several villages in reprisal; the guerillas fought until the end of the Japanese occupation. General Takashi Sakai, who led the invasion of Hong Kong and served as governor for some time, was tried as a war criminal and executed by a firing squad in 1946.

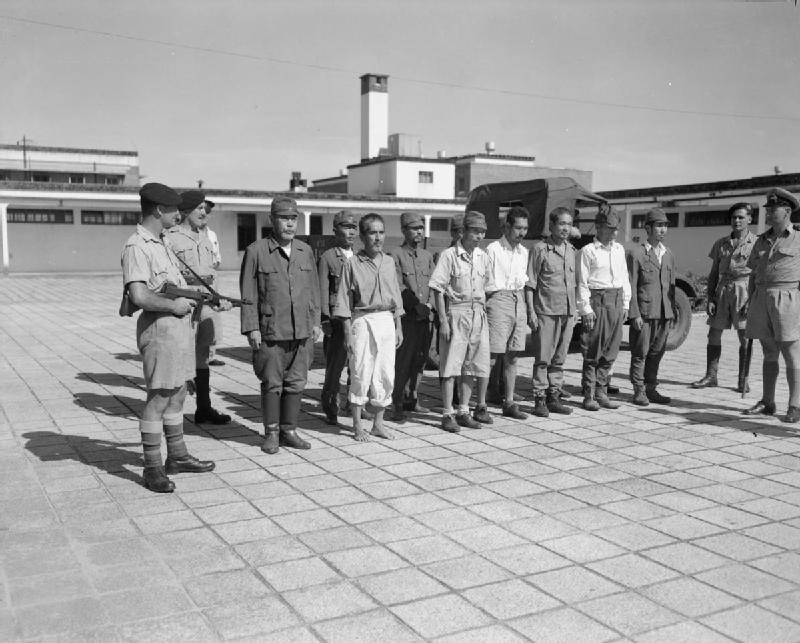
Japanese war criminals captured by British forces in Hong Kong

=== Response by the Canadian government ===
Following the fall of Hong Kong, Conservative Premier of Ontario George A. Drew accused the federal government under Liberal Prime Minister William Lyon Mackenzie King of incompetence for sending Canadian troops that were not sufficiently trained to Hong Kong. Minister of Defence James Ralston conceded that Canadian soldiers were not adequately trained for a combat role, but the government only expected the soldiers to serve in a garrison role.

King responded by organizing a Royal Commission into the decision to send Canadian troops to Hong Kong. While King considered Crerar as a commissioner, he was concerned that he may frame the deployment as a political decision. Chief Justice Lyman Duff was appointed as the commissioner, who subsequently cleared the government of any fault.

The Royal Commission and its outcome tarnished the reputation of Chief Justice Duff who had two years earlier been granted a bi-partisan extension by Parliament to his term despite being past the mandatory retirement age of 75. The report led to opposition in Parliament to further extensions of his term, and he subsequently retired in January 1943.

In July 1946, Major General Christopher Maltby, the British commander in Hong Kong completed his final report which contradicted Duff's report. The Canadian government had the report toned down and delayed its publication until January 1948.

=== Awards ===
Battalions from both Indian Army regiments earned Battle Honours for the defence of Hong Kong. In his despatch, Major-General C. M. Maltby, wrote about the conduct of troops under his command in Hong Kong and mentions the 5/7 Rajput Regiment: "This battalion fought well on the mainland and their repulse of the enemy attack on Devil's Peak was entirely successful. The full force of the enemy's initial attack on the island fell on this battalion and they fought gallantly until they had suffered heavy casualties (100% of British Officers and most senior Indian Officers being lost) and were run over".

- Gander was a Newfoundland dog posthumously awarded the Dickin Medal, the "animals' Victoria Cross", in 2000 for his deeds in World War II, the first such award in over 50 years. He picked up a thrown Japanese hand grenade and rushed with it toward the enemy, dying in the ensuing explosion but saving the lives of several wounded Canadian soldiers.
- Colonel Lance Newnham, Captain Douglas Ford and Flight Lieutenant Hector Bertram Gray were awarded the George Cross for the gallantry they showed in resisting Japanese torture in the immediate aftermath of the battle. The men had been captured and were in the process of planning a mass escape by British forces. Their plan was discovered but they refused to disclose information under torture and were shot by firing squad.
- Captain Mateen Ansari of the 5/7th Rajput's was awarded the George Cross "for most conspicuous gallantry in carrying out hazardous work in a very brave manner". Despite numerous efforts by the Japanese to get him to renounce his allegiance to the British and assist them in spreading subversion amongst the Indian ranks held in Japanese POW camps (after the fall of the Colony), all efforts failed. Ansari was tortured and starved for over five months before being sentenced to death. He was executed by beheading on 20 October 1943.
- Company Sergeant-Major John Osborn of A Company, 1st Battalion, The Winnipeg Grenadiers was awarded the Victoria Cross for his actions on Mount Butler on 19 December 1941. After leading part of his company in a bayonet charge to capture the hill and holding it for three hours, Osborn covered the withdrawal when the position became untenable, single-handedly engaging the enemy and exposing himself to heavy fire to guide stragglers back to safety. He was the first Canadian awarded the Victoria Cross in the Second World War, and his was the only one awarded for the Battle of Hong Kong.

== Commemoration ==
The Cenotaph in Central commemorates the defence as well as war-dead from the First World War. The shield in the colonial Emblem of Hong Kong granted in 1959, featured the battlement design to commemorate the defence of Hong Kong during the Second World War. This Coat of Arms was in place until 1997, when it was replaced by the regional emblem. After the war, Lei Yue Mun Fort became a training ground for the British Forces until 1987, when it was vacated. In view of its historical significance and unique architectural features, the former Urban Council decided in 1993 to conserve and develop the fort into the Hong Kong Museum of Coastal Defence.

The memorial garden at Hong Kong City Hall commemorates those who died in Hong Kong during World War II.

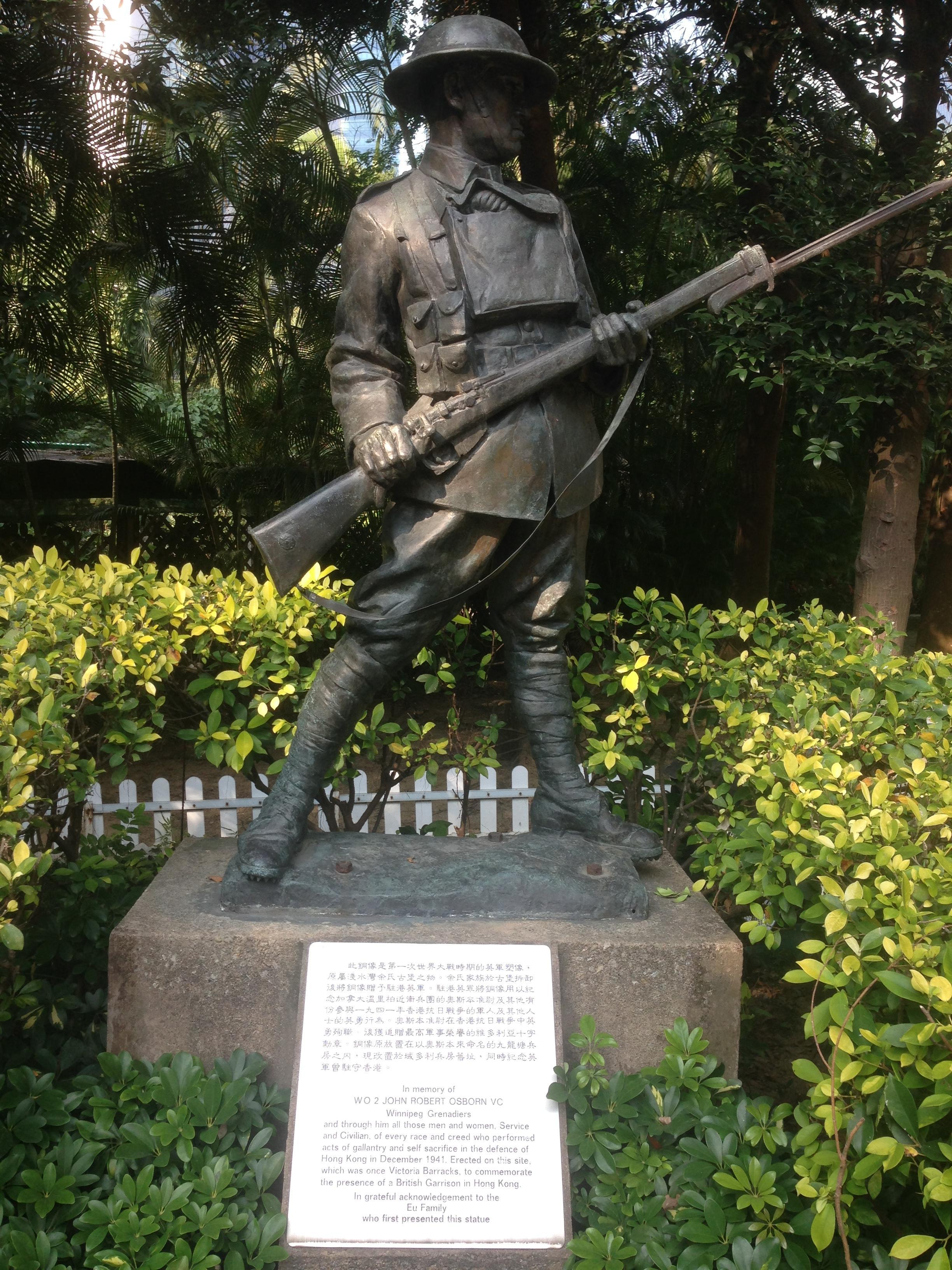
Statue of an anonymous World War I soldier from statuary collection of Eu Tong Sen. Also visible is the Battle of Hong Kong memorial plaque dedicated to all the defenders of Hong Kong in December 1941 through John Robert Osborn

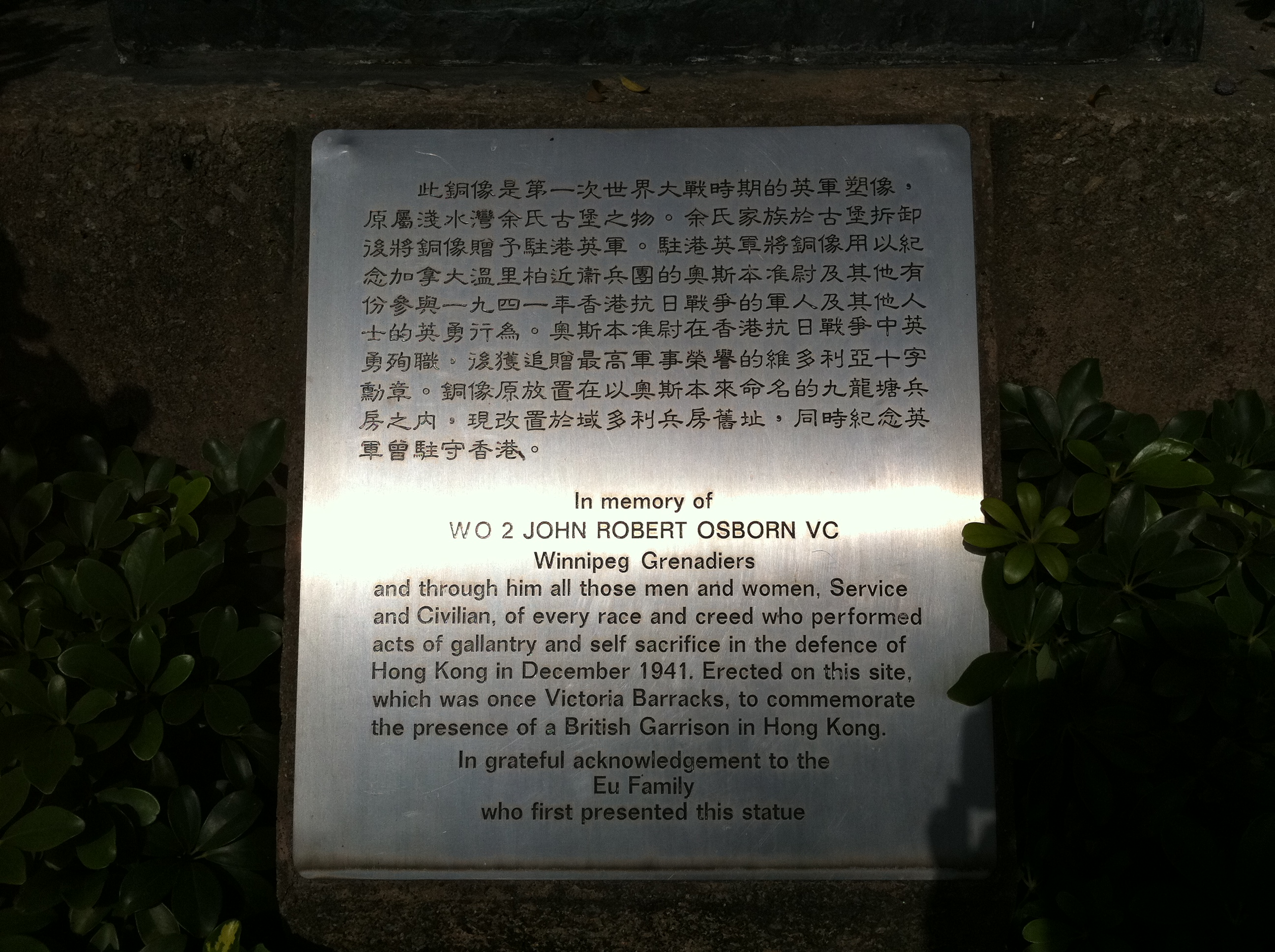
Memorial plaque dedicated to all the defenders of Hong Kong in December 1941 through John Robert Osborn and to commemorate the British Garrison at Hong Kong

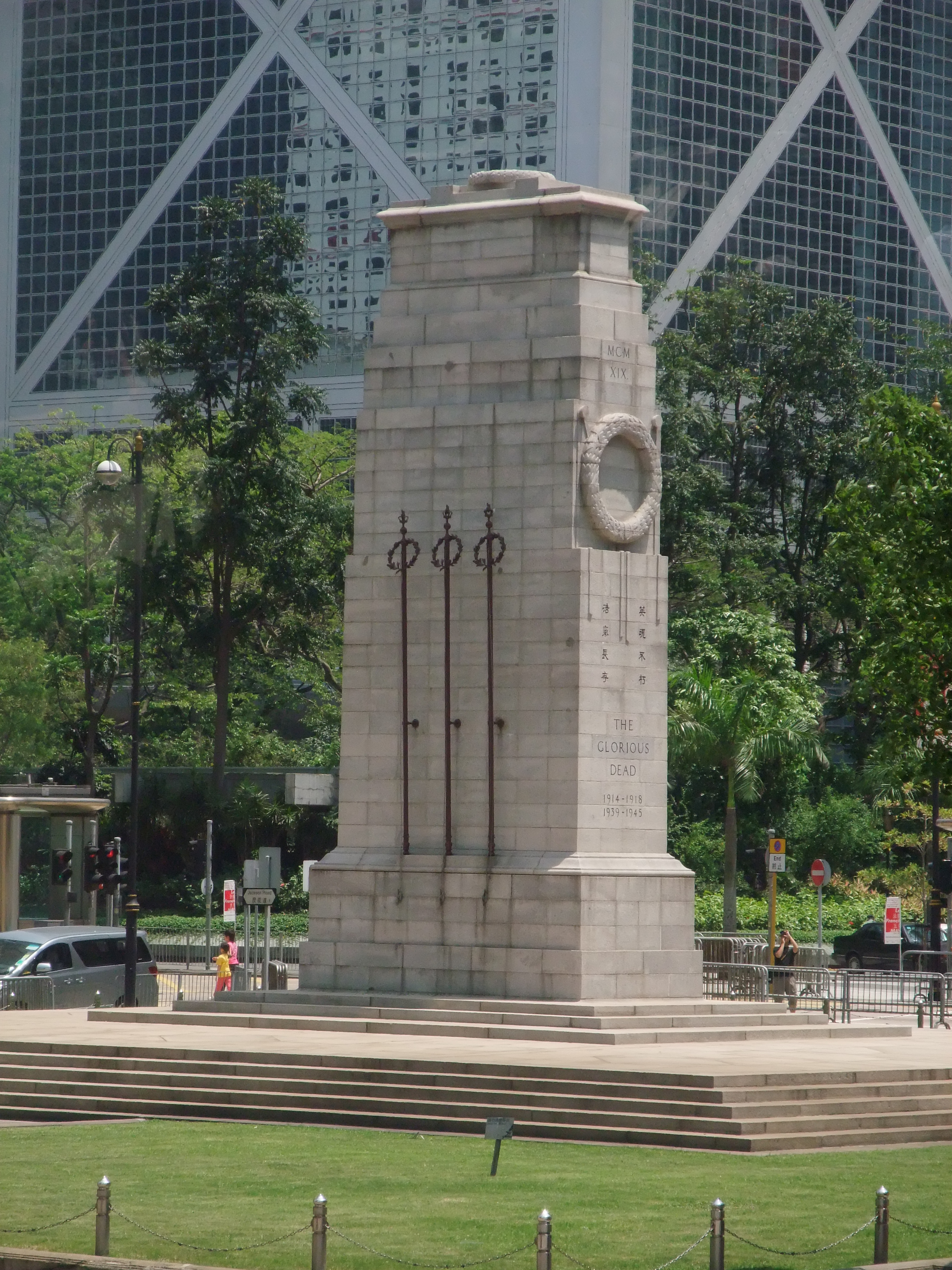
The Cenotaph in Hong Kong

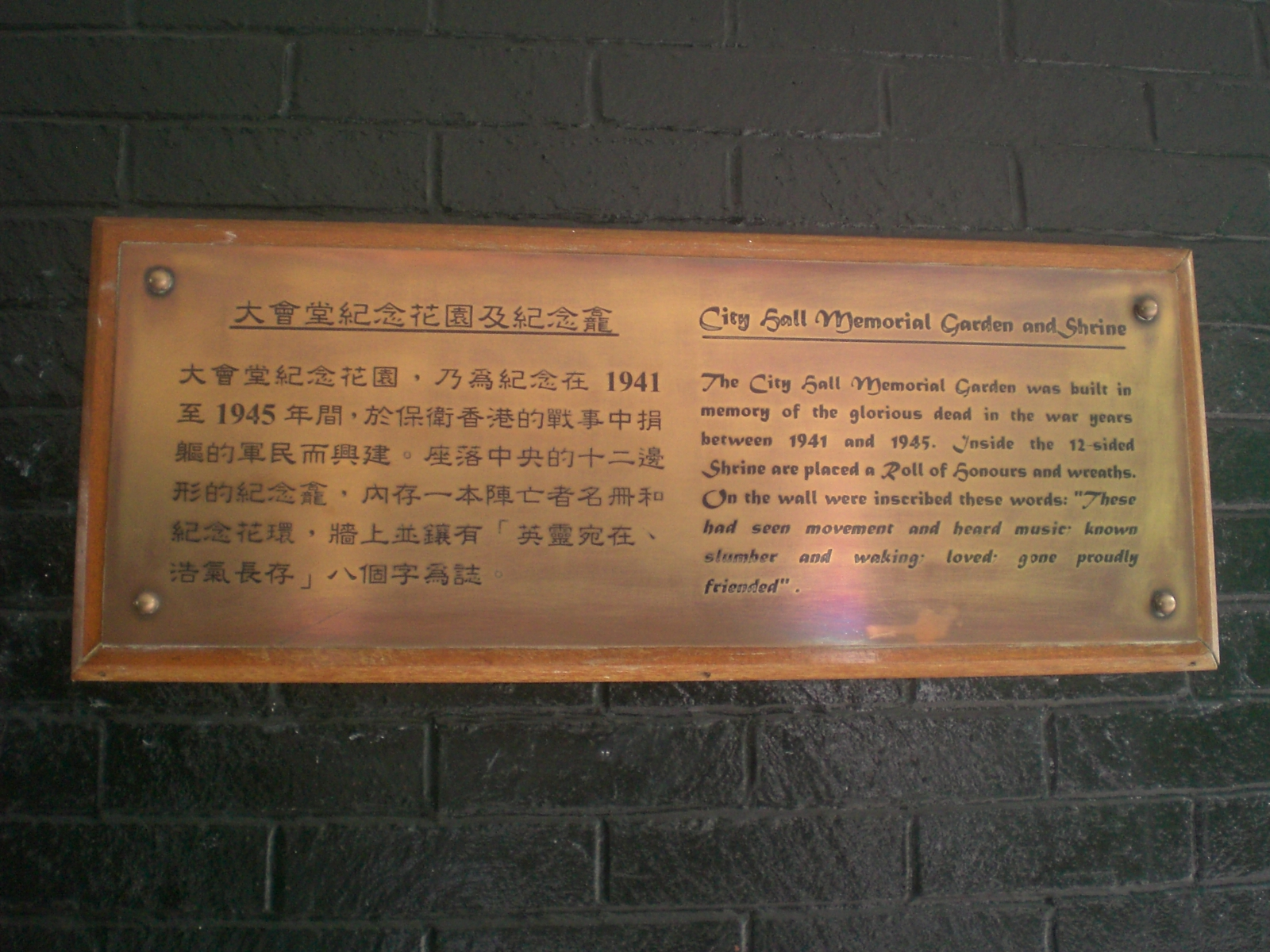
Commemorative plaque at the entrance to Memorial Gardens at Hong Kong City Hall

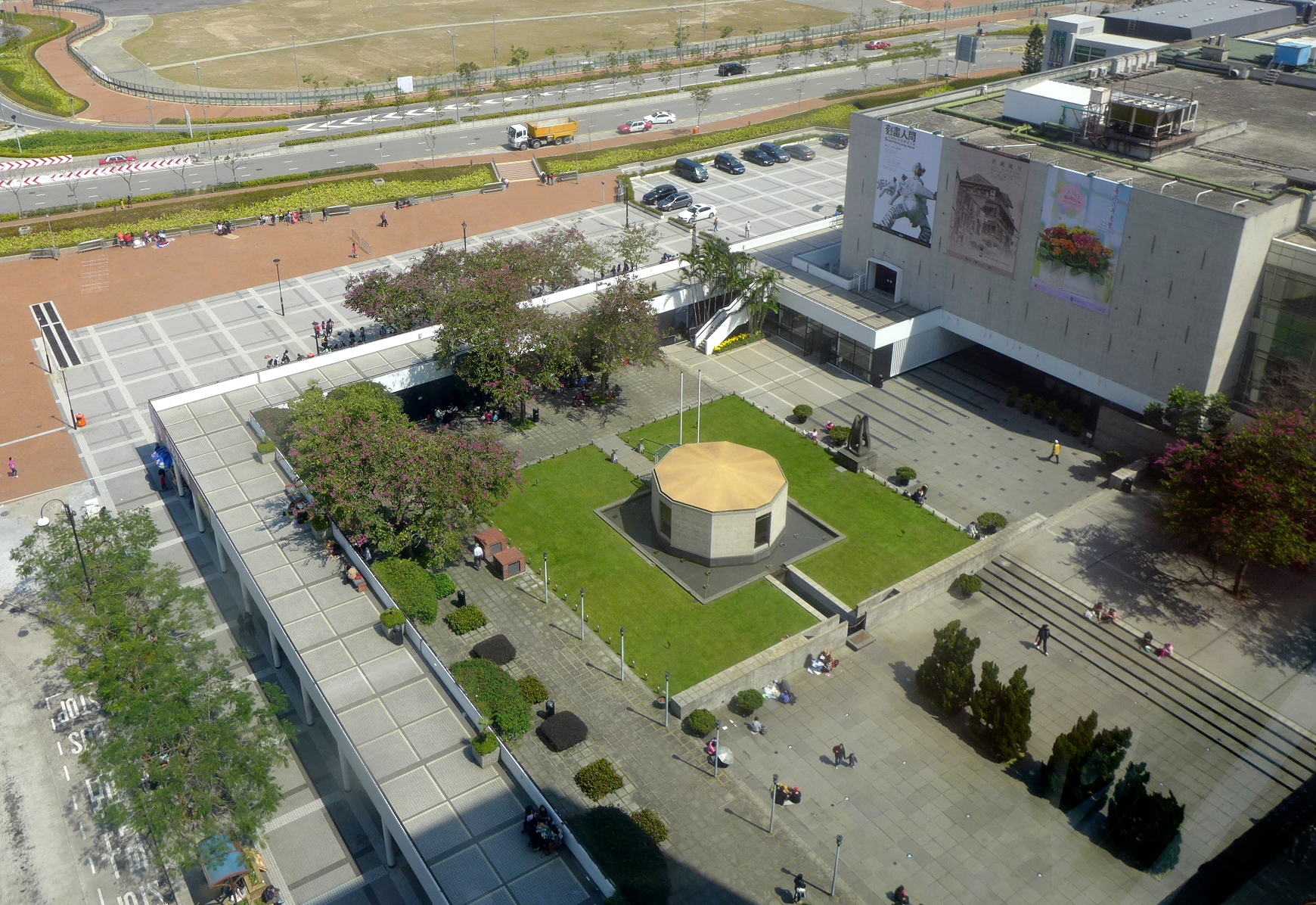
The memorial garden at Hong Kong City Hall

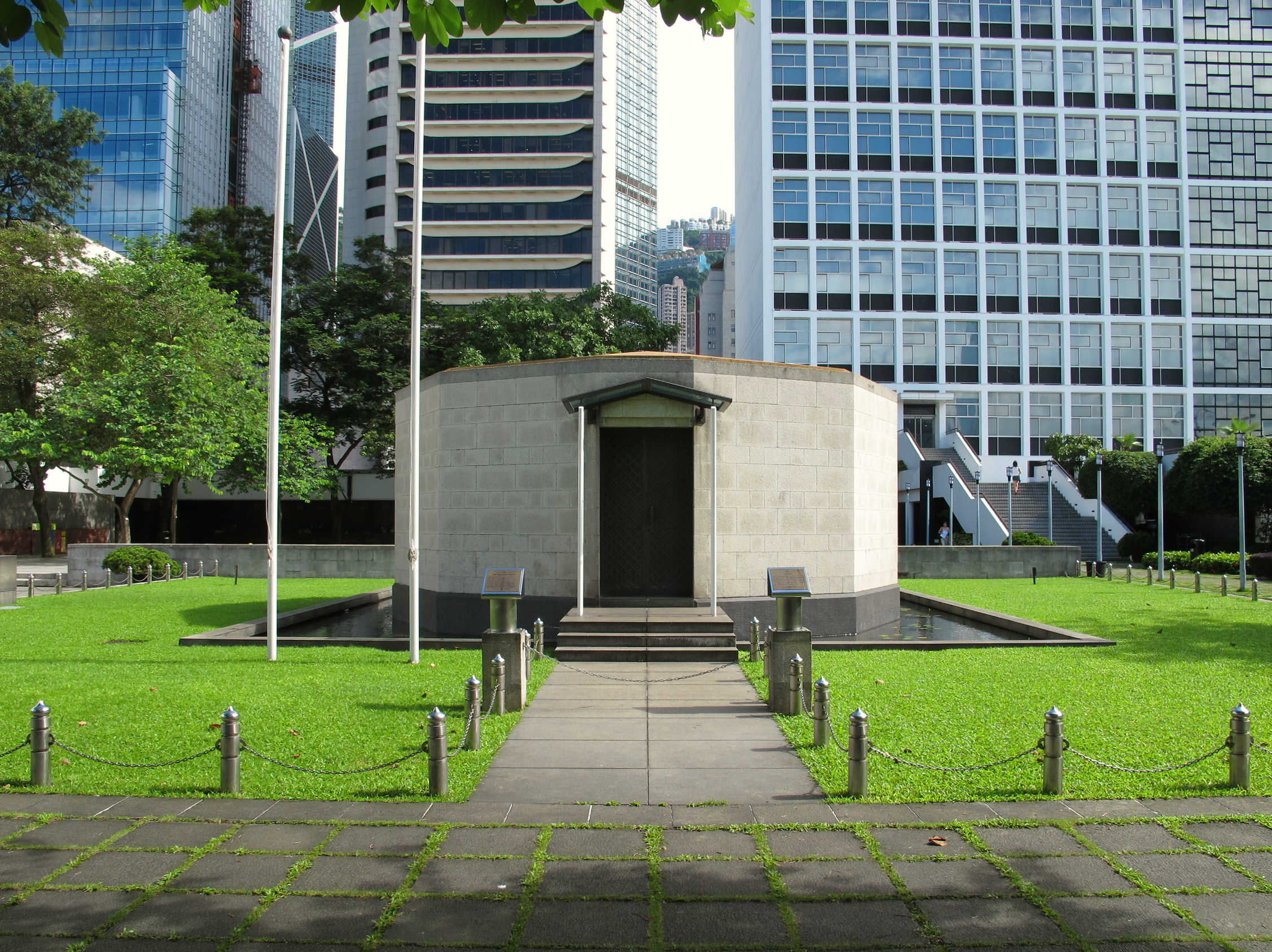
Shrine to the war dead in the memorial garden at Hong Kong City Hall

== See also ==
- Japanese occupation of Hong Kong
- Liberation of Hong Kong

== Bibliography ==
Books

- Banham, Tony (2005). Not the Slightest Chance: The Defence of Hong Kong, 1941. Hong Kong: Hong Kong University Press. ISBN 9622097804.
- Carew, Tim (1960). Fall of Hong Kong. London: Anthony Blond Ltd.
- Carroll, J. M. (2007). A Concise History of Hong Kong. Critical Issues in History. Lanham: Rowman & Littlefield. ISBN 978-0-74253-421-6.
- Chi Man, Kwong; Yiu Lun, Tsoi (2014). Eastern Fortress: A Military History of Hong Kong, 1840–1970. Hong Kong: Hong Kong University Press. ISBN 9789888208715.
- Fung, Chi Ming (2005). Reluctant Heroes: Rickshaw Pullers in Hong Kong and Canton, 1874–1954 (illus. ed.). Hong Kong University Press. ISBN 978-962-209-734-6.
- Harris, John R. (2005). The Battle for Hong Kong 1941–1945. Hong Kong: Hong Kong University Press. ISBN 978-962-209-779-7.
- Horne, Gerald (2004). Race war : white supremacy and the Japanese attack on the British Empire. New York: New York University Press. ISBN 978-0814736418.
- Ishiwari, Heizō (31 May 1956). Army Operations in China, December 1941 – December 1943 (PDF). Japanese Monograph. IV 17807.71-2. Washington, DC: Office of the Chief of Military History, Department of the Army. OCLC 938077822.
- Ko, Tim Keung; Wordie, Jason (1996). Ruins of War A Guide to Hong Kong's Battlefields and Wartime Sites. Joint Publishing (H.K.) Co. ISBN 9789620413728.
- Lai, Benjamin; Rava, Giuseppe (2014). Hong Kong 1941–45: First Strike in the Pacific War. Campaign. Osprey. ISBN 978-1-78200-268-0.
- Mackenzie, Compton (1951). Eastern Epic: September 1939 – March 1943, Defence. Vol. I. London: Chatto & Windus. OCLC 59637091.
- Nicholson, Brian (2010). Traitor. Bloomington, IN: Trafford. ISBN 978-1-4269-4604-2.
- Roland, Charles G. (2001). Long Night's Journey into Day: Prisoners of War in Hong Kong and Japan, 1941–1945. Waterloo, ON: Wilfrid Laurier University Press. ISBN 0-88920-362-8.
- Stacey, C. P. (1956) [1955]. Six Year of War: The Army in Canada, Britain and the Pacific (PDF). Official History of the Canadian Army in the Second World War. Vol. I (2nd rev. online ed.). Ottawa: By Authority of the Minister of National Defence. OCLC 917731527. Archived from the original (PDF) on 2 August 2016.
- Turner, John Frayn (2010) [2006]. Awards of the George Cross 1940–2009 (online, Pen & Sword, Barnsley ed.). Havertown, PA: Casemate. ISBN 978-1-78340-981-5.
- White, Barbara-Sue (1994). Turbans and Traders : Hong Kong's Indian Communities. Oxford University Press. ISBN 9780195852875.
- Woodburn Kirby, S.; et al. (2004) [1957]. Butler, J. R. M. (ed.). The War Against Japan: The Loss of Singapore. History of the Second World War United Kingdom Military Series. Vol. I (Naval & Military Press ed.). London: HMSO. ISBN 1-84574-060-2.
- Vincent, Carl (1981). No Reason Why: The Canadian Hong Kong Tragedy, an Examination. Stittsville, Ont.: Canada's Wings. ISBN 0-920002-12-9.

Journals

- Macri, David (2011). "The Fall of Hong Kong: The Condon Report". Canadian Military History. 20 (2): 65–80. ISSN 1195-8472.
- Roland, Charles G. (26 July 2016). "Massacre and Rape in Hong Kong: Two Case Studies Involving Medical Personnel and Patients". Journal of Contemporary History. 32 (1): 43–61. doi:10.1177/002200949703200104. ISSN 0022-0094. JSTOR 261075. S2CID 159971599.

Newspapers

- "(Associated Press) Japan Apologizes to Canadian POWs from H. K. Battle". Japan Times. 10 December 2011. p. 2. ISSN 0289-1956.

Websites

- Kwong, Chi Man. "The Battle of Hong Kong 1941: A Spatial History Project". Hong Kong Baptist University Library, History in Data.
- Linton, Suzannah. "Hong Kong's War Crimes Trials Collection: Libraries". The University of Hong Kong.
