= Violet Hill (Hong Kong) =

Hill in Tai Tam Country Park, Hong Kong

- 紫羅蘭山
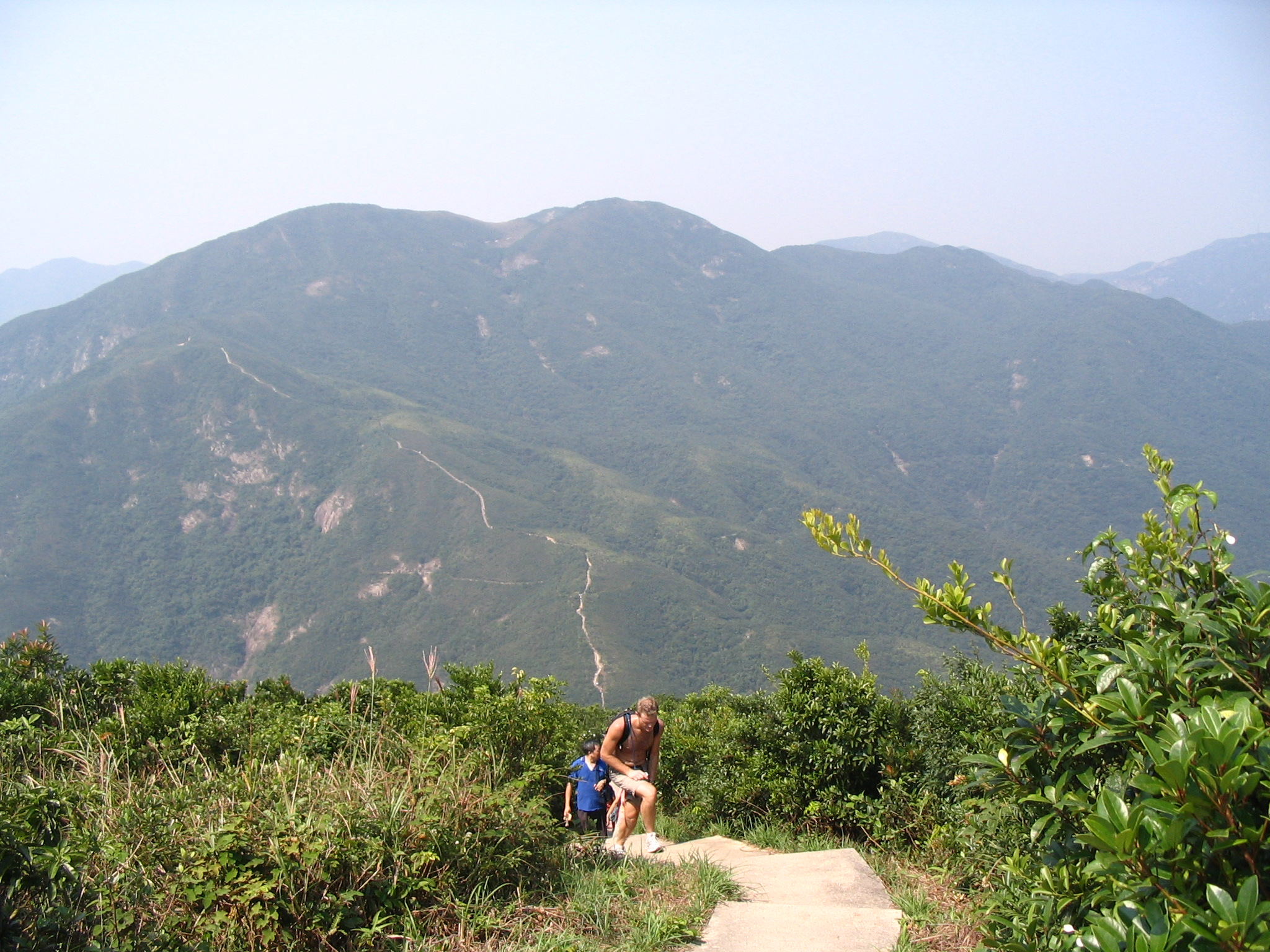
- View of Violet Hill

Highest point
- Elevation: 436 m (1,430 ft); HKPD
- Coordinates: 22°15′0.22″N 114°11′54.59″E

Geography
- Location within Hong Kong
- Location: Hong Kong

Violet Hill (Chinese: 紫羅蘭山; Cantonese Yale: jí lòh làahn shāan; lit. 'violet flower hill'), also known as Tsz Lo Lan Shan, is located within Tai Tam Country Park in Hong Kong. The hill is a popular site for hiking. The Hong Kong Government named three trails on the hill, namely Wilson Trail, Tsz Lo Lan Shan Path and Tai Tam Country Trail. Towards its top, the hill splits into three peaks of altitude 436 m (1,430 ft), 433 m (1,421 ft) and 430 m (1,410 ft), respectively. It offers views of the group of Tai Tam Reservoirs and Wong Nai Chung Reservoir. The hill is well preserved, with little construction on the hill. A rare and protected species, the Hong Kong iris (Iris speculatrix), with its violet flower, can be found on the hill.

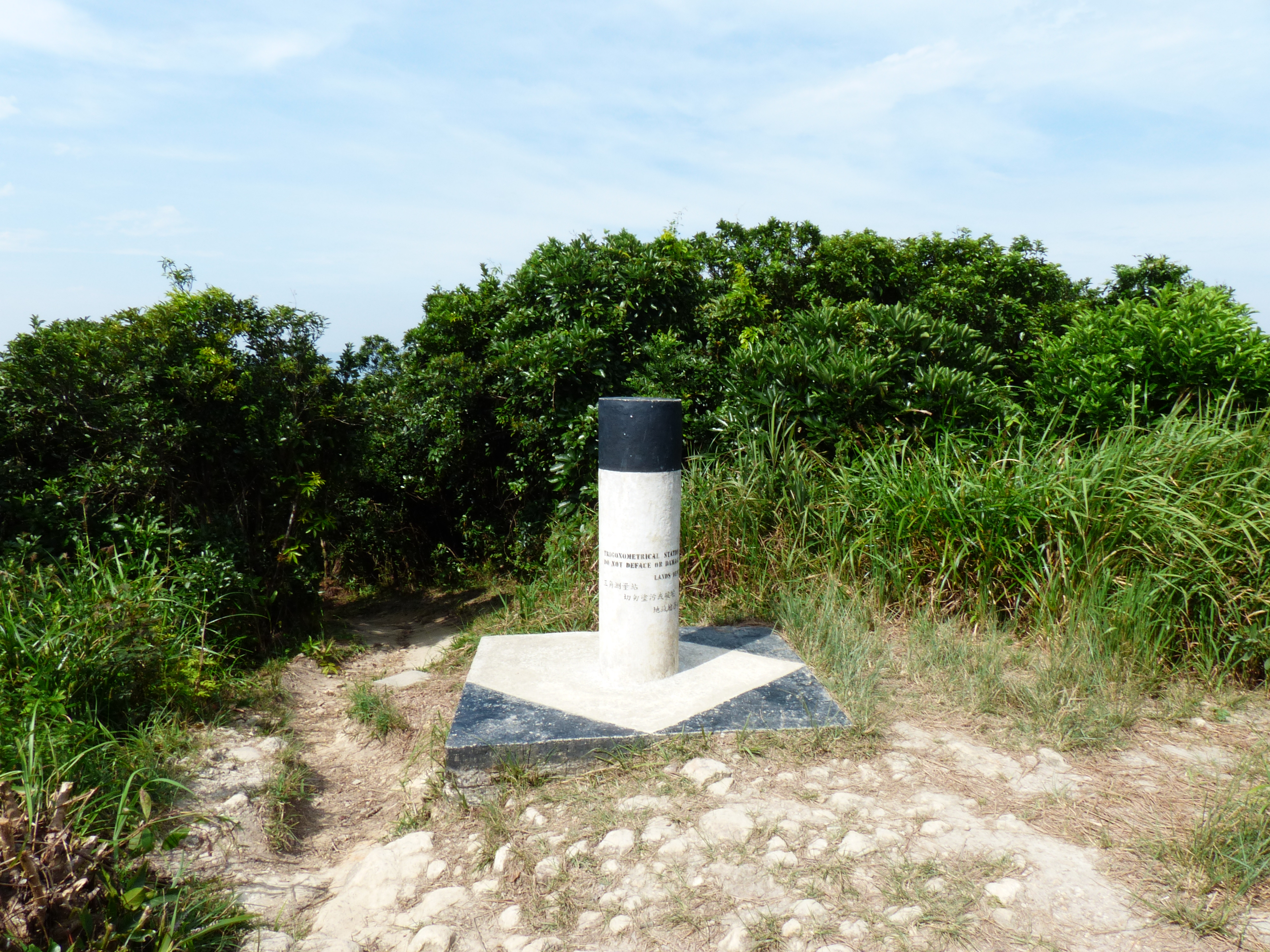
Summit of Violet Hill

== Geography ==
The hill is situated in mid-southern Hong Kong Island. Apart from the shore of Deep Water Bay and Repulse Bay in its southwest, the hill is surrounded by valleys with other hills on the island. With Mount Nicholson in its northwest, it forms a crossroad of Wong Nai Chung Gap where Wong Nai Chung Reservoir is sited. With Mount Butler in its northeast and Jardine's Lookout in the north, a valley leads to Tai Tam Reservoir in its east, an important water supply construction in the early colonial history of Hong Kong. Another mountain pass, Tsin Shui Wan Au (淺水灣坳), forms with The Twins and Cheung Lin Shan allows one runs from Tai Tam Intermediate Reservoir to the Repulse Bay.

== History ==
During World War II, the hill was part of the hostilities near Wong Nai Chung Gap during the Battle of Hong Kong and was used by Japanese forces with field guns to shell Aberdeen.

== Road access ==
There is no road access up the hill. Two surrounding roads, Repulse Bay Road and Tai Tam Reservoir Road, lead from Wong Nai Chung Gap to Repulse Bay and Tai Tam Reservoir, respectively.

== See also ==
- List of mountains, peaks and hills in Hong Kong
- The Twins
