= Jardine's Lookout =

Mountain in Wan Chai District, Hong Kong

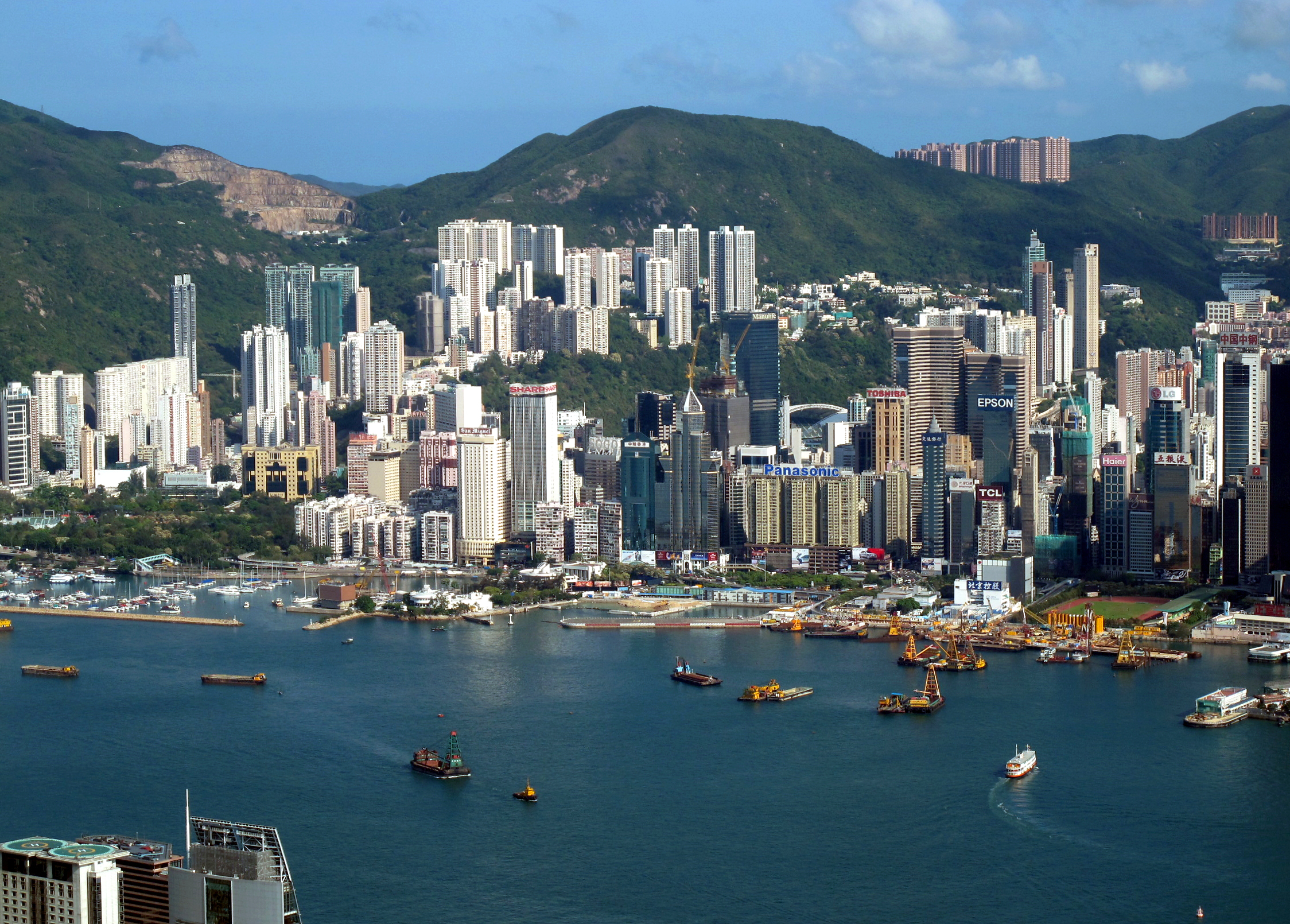
- Jardine’s Lookout from Victoria Harbour

Highest point
- Elevation: 433 m (1,421 ft)
- Coordinates: 22°16′5.772″N 114°11′32.784″E

Naming
- Native name: 渣甸山

Geography
- Location within Hong Kong
- Location: Hong Kong

Jardine's Lookout
- Chinese: 渣甸山
- Literal meaning: Jardine Mountain
Transcriptions
Standard Mandarin
- Hanyu Pinyin: Zhādiàn Shān
Yue: Cantonese
- Jyutping: zaa1 din1 saan1

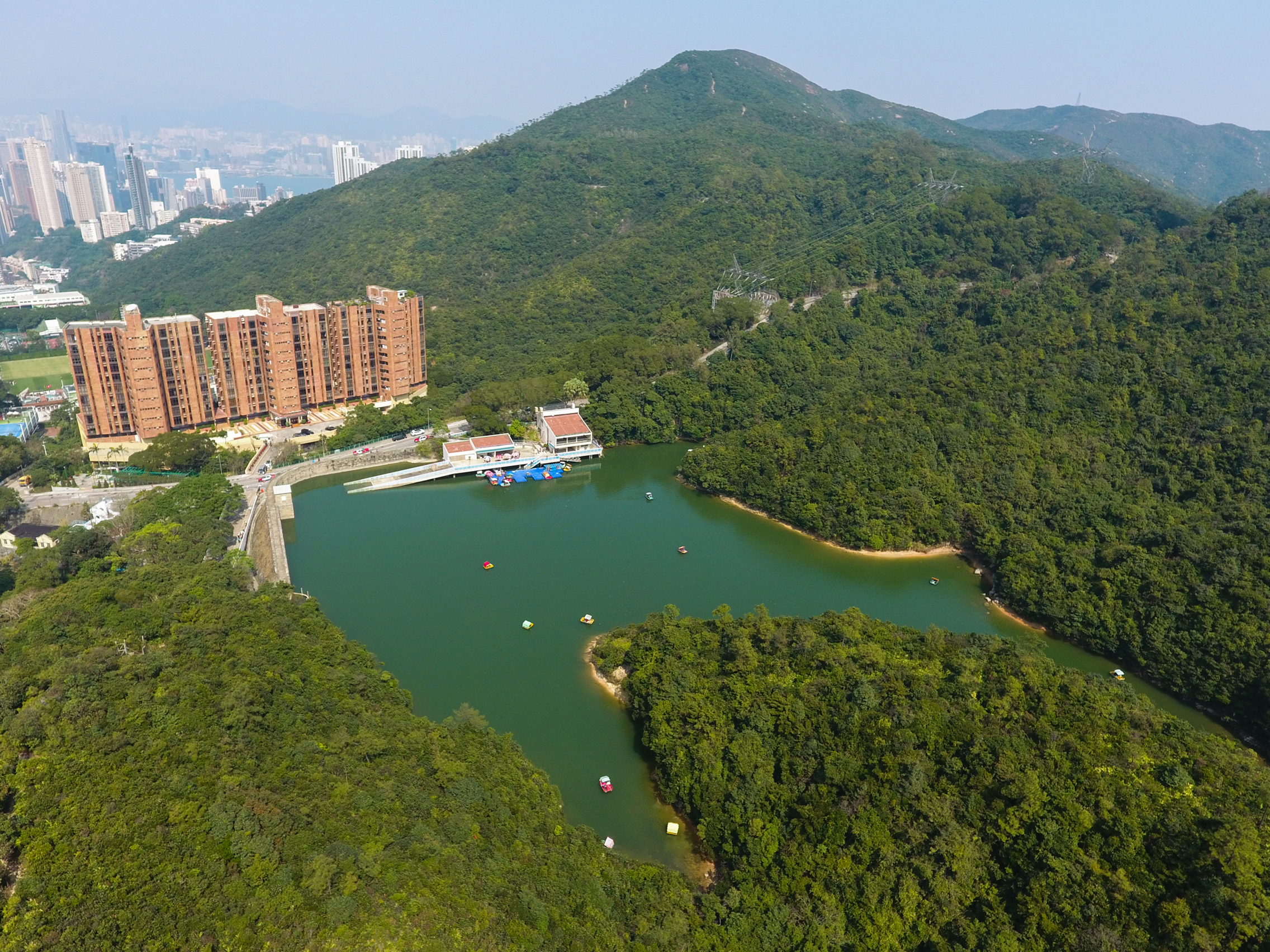
Jardine's Lookout is the hill in the centre. Wong Nai Chung Reservoir is in the foreground.

Jardine's Lookout (Chinese: 渣甸山) is a mountain in Wan Chai District, Hong Kong, with a height of 433 metres (1,421 ft). It is located east of Happy Valley, south of Causeway Bay, and west of Braemar Hill and north of Tai Tam Country Park. It has Hong Kong's most expensive landed single houses, more valuable than ones on Victoria Peak.

A low-density, high-end residential area called Jardine's Lookout can be found between Wong Nai Chung Gap and Mount Butler. The residential area of Jardine's Lookout consists of thirteen roads named after famous British persons during Hong Kong's colonial times. Addresses on Tai Hang Road, Tai Hang Drive and Chun Fai Road are considered to be Tai Hang Mid-levels or Happy Valley, not Jardine's Lookout.

Jardine's Lookout is surrounded by several other hills including Mount Nicholson, Violet Hill and Mount Butler. Jardine's Lookout is the second most expensive area in Hong Kong, after Deep Water Bay and more expensive than Victoria Peak which is not among the top three most expensives areas in Hong Kong. Jardine's Lookout has many entries in the list of the most expensives houses in Hong Kong.

== History ==
Jardine's Lookout is named after William Jardine, founder of Jardine Matheson. It was from here, in the days of the sailing ships, that a watch was kept for the first glimpse of the sails of the firm's clippers coming from India and London. As soon as a vessel was signaled, a fast whaleboat was sent out to collect Jardine's mail. The correspondence was rushed back to the office so that the directors could have the first possible information on the world's markets. (This practice saved the company on at least one occasion, in 1866, when it learned of the collapse of the discount house Overend, Gurney and Company, about one hour before others did, and quickly withdrew its balances at a local bank before anyone else had heard of the news.)

Jardine's Lookout was the sight of fierce conflict in the Battle of Hong Kong and particularly, the Battle of Wong Nai Chung Gap. The Hong Kong Volunteer Defense Corps and Middlesex Machine gunners manned two pillboxes and other areas defending the pass around Jardine's Catchwater, as well as Canadian Winnipeg Grenadiers defending the adjacent Mount Butler. Japanese forces, after landing on the North Shore of Hong Kong Island, used Sir Cecil's Ride and moved up to this pass midway up the lookout and were engaged by Commonwealth forces. The fighting was the preliminary conflict in the Battle of Wong Nai Chung Gap.

Jardine's Lookout and Mount Butler are popular for hikers who can enjoy scenery of Victoria Harbour. There are different routes to the top of the mountains and hikers often start near Hong Kong Parkview through Wilson Trail.

== Residential area ==
Due to its scenic view and low population density, Jardine's Lookout is an affluent neighbourhood with the most expensive houses in Hong Kong, with prices higher than Victoria Peak. The residents of this community include highly placed expatriates, government officials and successful business people.

Although Jardine's Lookout is commonly known as where Cavendish Heights is located at, the multi-block estate sits on the fringe of Jardine's Lookout, on the border of Mount Butler, which is on the eastern side of block one. Residential buildings such as Park Garden, Flora Garden and Elm Tree Towers on Tai Hang Drive and Chun Fai Road are considered as the upper part of Tai Hang, below Mount Butler not Jardine's Lookout.

Jardine's Lookout has large detached houses in private lots and more moderate townhouses on its thirteen roads. It is the only area in Hong Kong with streets that only have single-lot landed houses. Low-rise and high-rise apartments make up the rest of the community. Houses in private lots include ones built in the 1950s which were in recent years sold to wealthy mainlanders. In 2015, Cheung Chung-kiu, Chairman of CC Land, reportedly purchased 1 Purves Road for about HK$760 million, or around HK$100,000 per square foot. In 2019, Joseph Lau Luen-hung's residence at 2 Goldsmith Road ranked the fifth as Hong Kong's most expensive residential properties in rental value estimated by the Hong Kong Government, with an annual estimated rental value of HK$8.23 million. In 2018, this house was reportedly by Apple Daily to be worth HK$2.5 billion. Translating into HK$250,000 per sq. ft. based on internal floor area of around 10,000 square feet,) it is the most valuable house in Hong Kong, followed by 75 Deep Water Bay Road. In 2020, the site at 20 Perkins Road was sold for HK$850 million. Another site on Perkins Road in 2018 which changed hands at HK$145,000 per square foot. Jardine's Lookout has no hospitals, few public facilities, and very few local and overseas tourists. Only single detached houses can be built on private lots of most of the streets.

Jardine's Lookout has a grocery store, deli, florists, post office and many small provisions stores. This community is conveniently linked with public transportation and well-equipped with facilities. Jardine's Lookout is only a 10-minute drive to Central and 5-minute drive to Causeway Bay, (given good traffic) where the Cross-Harbour Tunnel is located, making the travel to Kowloon easy.

=== Famous residents ===
- Joseph Lau Luen-hung, property tycoon
- Gordon Wu, property tycoon
- Miyakawa Michiko, wife of Chow Yei-ching, late Chairman of Chevalier Group
- Cheung Chung-kiu, property tycoon

In June 2016, the Government of Canada sold the official residence of the Consul General located at 6 Goldsmith Road.

== Education ==
Jardine's Lookout is in Primary One Admission (POA) School Net 12. Within the school net are multiple aided schools (operated independently but funded with government money) and the following government schools: Hennessy Road Government Primary School and Sir Ellis Kadoorie (Sookunpo) Primary School.

Located on Mt Butler Drive, the Lycée Français International Victor Segalen, a French international school, maintains its Jardine's Lookout campus, housing primary school classes.

Braemar Hill Nursery School is on Chun Fai Road, on the fringe of Jardine's Lookout.

== Transport ==
There are taxis and buses that can bring residents to the main districts in Hong Kong.

=== Thoroughfares, roads and streets ===
- Boyce Road (Hong Kong)
- Clementi Road (not accessible by car)
- Cooper Road
- Creasy Road
- Goldsmith Road
- Henderson Road
- Moorsom Drive
- Moorsom Road
- Mount Butler Drive
- Mount Butler Road
- Perkins Road
- Purves Road
- Price Road
- Sir Cecil's Ride (not accessible by car)
- Wilson Road

== See also ==
- List of mountains, peaks and hills in Hong Kong
- Wong Nai Chung Gap

Names related to Jardine

- Jardine's Bazaar
- Jardine House
- Yee Wo Street
