= Jardine Peak =

Jardine Peak (62°10′S 58°31′W) is a peak, 285 metres (935 ft) high, standing 1 nautical mile (2 km) southwest of Point Thomas on the west side of Admiralty Bay, King George Island, in the South Shetland Islands. It was named by the UK Antarctic Place-Names Committee in 1960 for D. Jardine of the Falkland Islands Dependencies Survey, a geologist at Admiralty Bay in 1949, who travelled extensively on King George Island.
