= The Twins, Hong Kong =

Hills in Hong Kong

The Twins
- 孖崗山
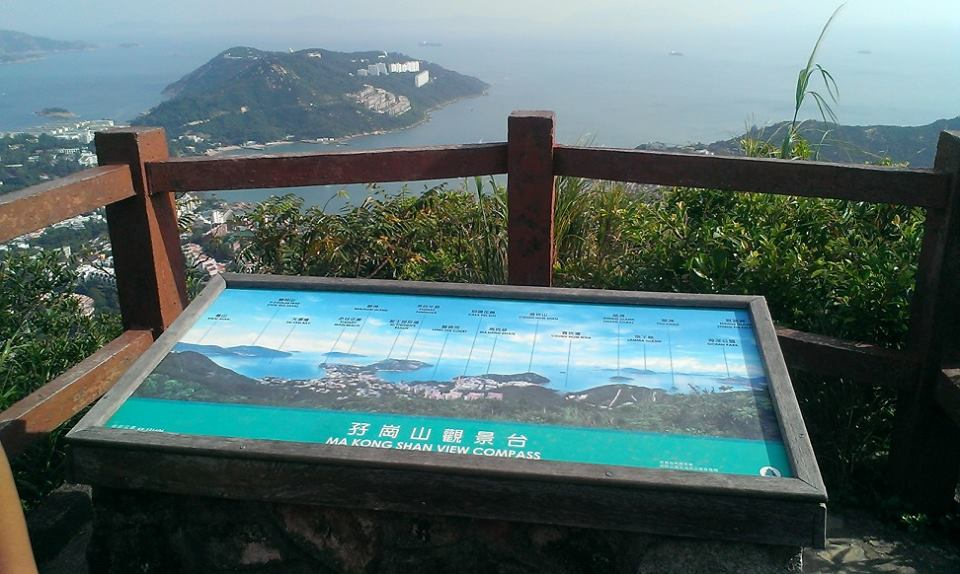
- View from Ma Kong Shan View Compass

Highest point
- Elevation: 386 m (1,266 ft)
- Coordinates: 22°13′50.47″N 114°12′19.24″E

Geography
- Location within Hong Kong
- Location: Hong Kong

The Twins (Chinese: 孖崗山), also officially known as Ma Kong Shan, are a pair of mountains in southern Hong Kong. They are a popular destination for hikers and fitness enthusiasts as part of the rigorous Violet Hill-The Twins Hike on Hong Kong Island. Hiking up The Twins involves walking up a long steep set of stairs featuring more than 1000 steps straight up.

== Geography ==
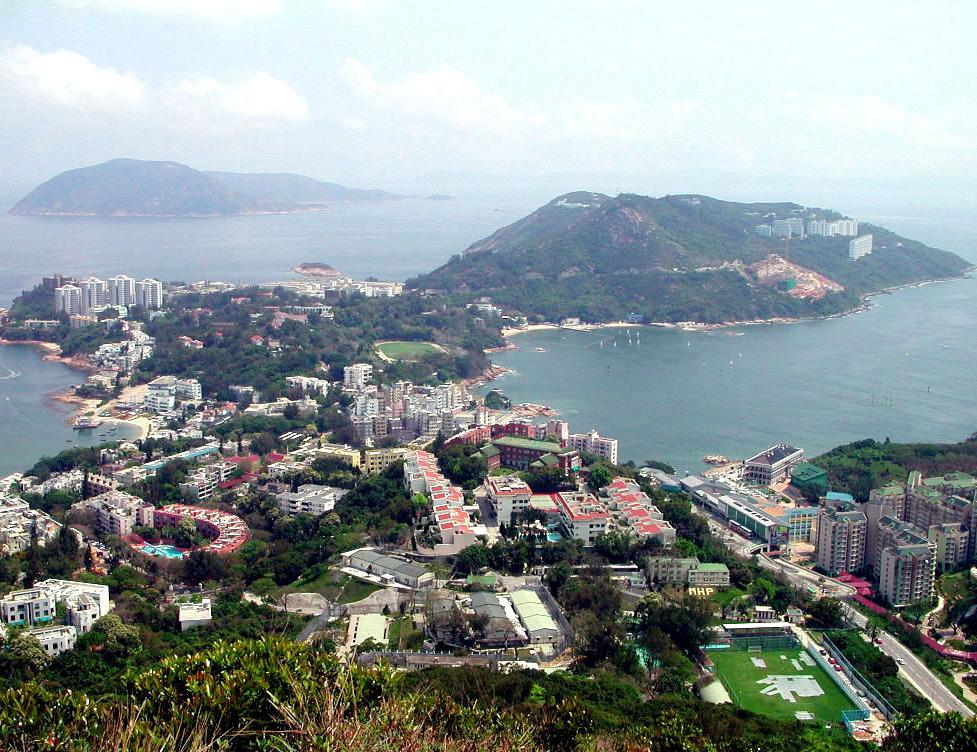
View of Stanley Peninsula from The Twins

The Twins are two peaks of similar height lined up from north to south. The Southern Twin is the taller mountain at 386 metres (1,266 ft) in height, while the Northern Twin stands at 363 metres (1,191 ft). To the north of the Twins lies another prominent hill called Violet Hill.

== Access ==
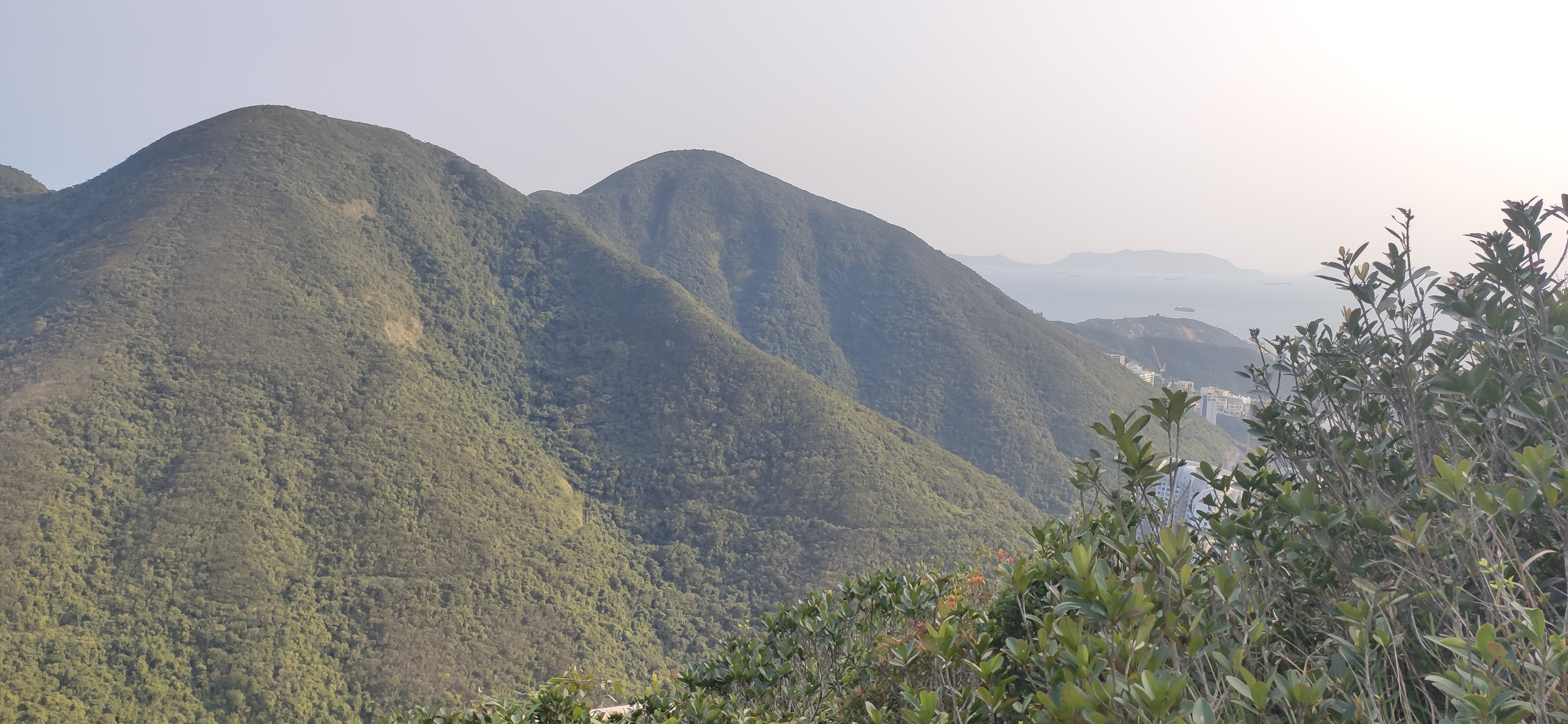
The Twins (Ma Kong Shan)

Section 1 of the Wilson Trail runs through the top ridges of The Twins. It is possible to go to the Twins from either Stanley, Tai Tam Reservoirs, or Repulse Bay

== See also ==
- List of mountains, peaks and hills in Hong Kong
- Tai Tam Reservoirs
- Stanley, Hong Kong
