= Jardin =

Jardin may refer to:

== Places ==
- Jardin, Isère, a village in Isère, France
- Le Jardin, a village in Corrèze, France
- Jardin, Colombia, a town in Antioquia

== Family name ==
- Alexandre Jardin (born 1965), French writer and film director
- Frédéric Jardin (born 1968), French film director
- Nicolas-Henri Jardin (1720–1799), French architect, introduced neoclassicism to Danish architecture
- Pascal Jardin (1934–1980), French screenwriter
- Véronique Jardin (born 1966), French Olympic swimmer

== See also ==
- Dujardin
- Jardine
