= Brocklebank =

Brocklebank may refer to:

- Brocklebank (automobile), a British car built by Brocklebank and Richards Ltd in Birmingham from 1925 to 1929
- Brocklebank Dock, a dock on the River Mersey, England and part of the Port of Liverpool
- Brocklebank Dock railway station, a former railway station on the Liverpool Overhead Railway
- Brocklebank Line, a shipping company based in Whitehaven and then Liverpool

== See also ==
- Brocklebank (surname) for a list of people with the surname Brocklebank
- Brocklebank-Nelson-Beecher House, a First Period Colonial house in Georgetown, Massachusetts
