= Brocklebank (surname) =

Brocklebank is a surname. Notable people with the surname include:

- Bob Brocklebank (1908–1981), English football manager
- Daniel Brocklebank (shipbuilder) (1742–1801), shipbuilder, first in North America and then at Whitehaven
- Daniel Brocklebank (born 1979), British actor
- Edmund Brocklebank (1882–1949), British politician
- John Brocklebank (1915–1974), English baronet and cricketer
- Sage Brocklebank (born 1978), Canadian actor
- Ted Brocklebank (born 1942), British politician
- Thomas Brocklebank (1899–1953), English baronet and cricketer

== See also ==
- Brocklebank baronets
