= Aubrey Brocklebank =

British entrepreneur and racing driver (born 1952)

- Born: 29 January 1952 (age 74)
- Education: Eton College; University College, Durham
- Occupation: entrepreneur

Sir Aubrey Thomas Brocklebank, 6th Baronet (born 29 January 1952) is a British entrepreneur and racing driver. He is the sixth Baronet Brocklebank of Greenlands and Irton Hall. He is the son of Sir John Brocklebank, a British army Major and first-class cricketer, and Pamela Pierce.

== Life ==
He was educated at Eton College and University College, Durham, graduating with a Bachelor of Science in Psychology. From 1981-1986 he worked for the merchant bank Guinness Mahon. Brocklebank is a trained accountant and sits on eight venture capital trust boards. He briefly came to public attention in 2012 when it emerged that he had bought the contract to look after London's fire-engines for £2, through one of his firms, AB&A investments. He consequently set-up Premier Fire Serve, which as of 2017, was being paid over £1,500,000 monthly to look after London's fleet.

He is a member of Brooks's and the Citroën 2CV Racing Club.

== Marriage ==
Brocklebank has married twice.

Firstly to Dr Anna-Marie Dunnet, (m. 1979; div. 1989), with whom he had two children.

- Aubrey William Thomas Brocklebank (b. 1980)
- Hamish John Brocklebank (b. 1987)

He married secondly to Hazel Roden, (m. 1997), with whom he had one child.

- Archibald “Archie” Thomas Brocklebank (b. 1999; d. 2019)

== Baronetcy ==
The Brocklebank baronetcy was created in 1885 for Thomas Brocklebank, Deputy Lieutenant of Cumberland. His son, also Thomas, was succeeded by Aubrey Brocklebank, Director of the Cunard Steamship Company of the Suez Canal Company and of the Great Western Railway. On his death, the baronetcy passed to his son, Thomas Brocklebank, who died unmarried. Subsequently, the title was inherited by his brother, John Brocklebank, Aubrey's father.

Aubrey Brocklebank succeeded to the baronetcy in 1974, following the death of his father. His eldest son, also Aubrey Brocklebank, is heir apparent.

Baronetage of the United Kingdom
Preceded by John Brocklebank	Baronet (of Greenlands and Springwood); 1974–present	Incumbent
