= Brockelbank =

Surname list

Brockelbank is a surname. Notable people with the surname include:

- John Edward Brockelbank (1931–2020), Canadian politician, son of John Hewgill
- John Hewgill Brockelbank (1897–1977), Canadian politician

== See also ==
- Brocklebank (surname)
