= Margam Abbey =

Coordinates: 51°33′22″N 3°43′45″W

- St Mary's Abbey Church, Margam
- Abaty Margam
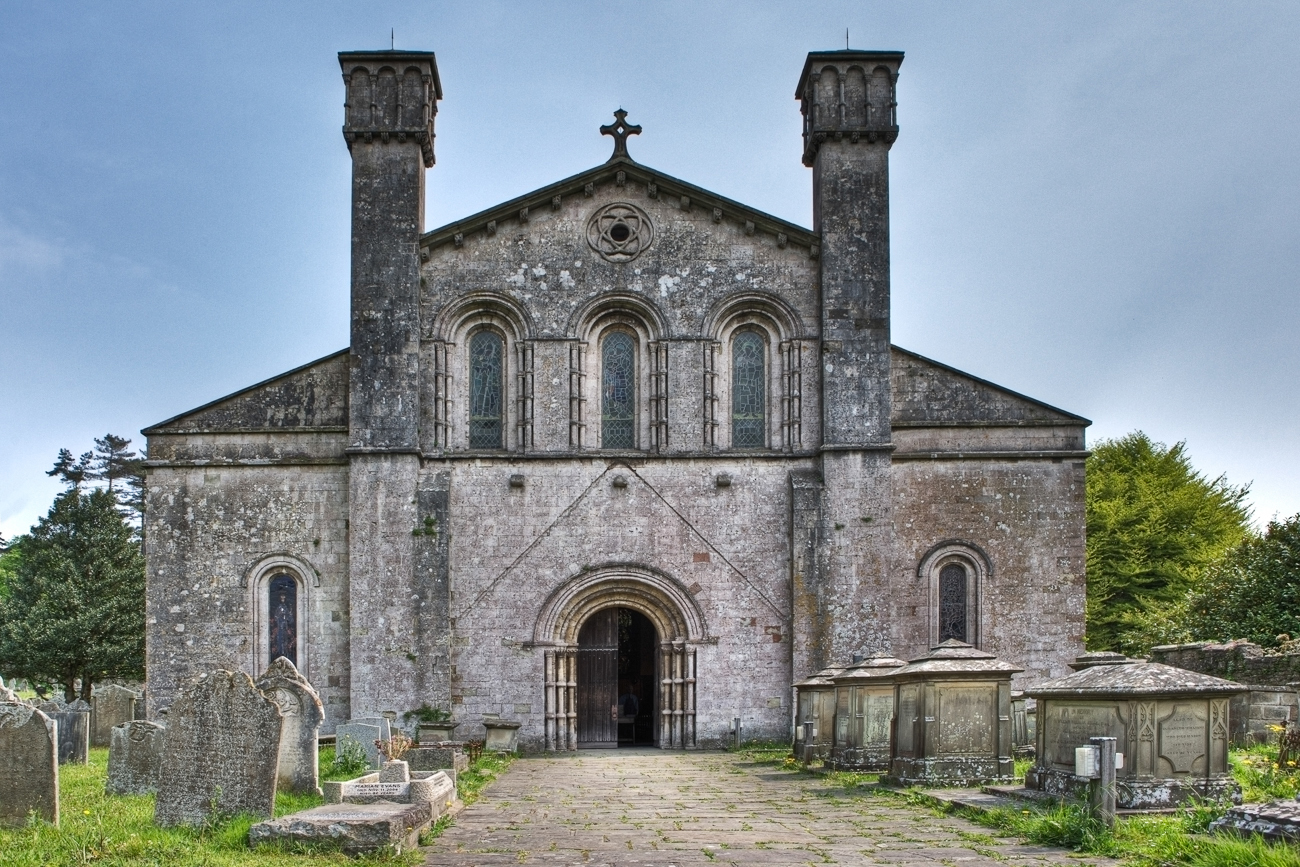
- Margam Abbey: the present parish Church of St Mary comprises the nave of the abbey church
- Margam Abbey
- Location: Margam, Port Talbot, Neath Port Talbot
- Country: Wales
- Denomination: Church in Wales
- Previous denomination: Roman Catholic
- Churchmanship: Anglo-Catholic

History
- Status: Parish church
- Founded: 1147
- Dedication: Saint Mary

Architecture
- Functional status: Active
- Heritage designation: Grade I
- Style: Romanesque

Administration
- Province: Wales
- Diocese: Llandaff
- Archdeaconry: Margam

Margam Abbey (Welsh: Abaty Margam) was a Cistercian monastery, located in the village of Margam, a suburb of modern Port Talbot in Wales. The nave of the abbey church is still in use as the church of St Mary in the Church in Wales.

== History ==
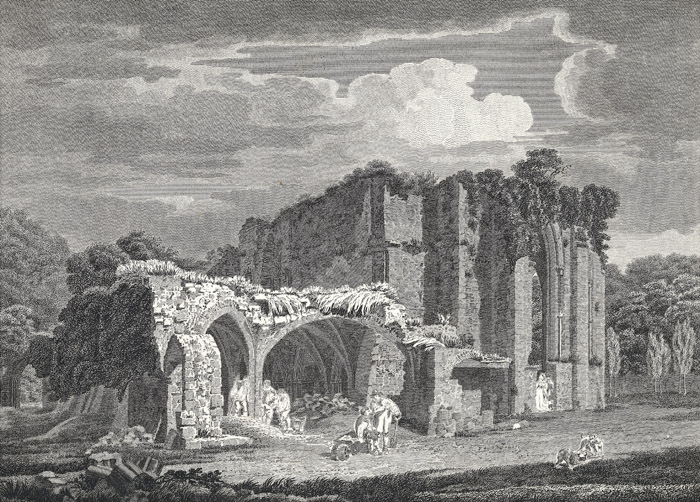
Margam Abbey ruins 1805

The abbey was founded in 1147 as a daughter house of Clairvaux by Robert, Earl of Gloucester, and was dedicated to the Blessed Virgin Mary. Early Christian crosses found in the close vicinity and conserved in the nearby Margam Stones Museum suggest the existence of an earlier Celtic monastic community. The founding abbot was William of Clairvaux. The third abbot, Conan, enjoyed the praise of Giraldus Cambrensis, whom he appears to have entertained prior to his official visit with Baldwin of Forde, Archbishop of Canterbury, to preach the Crusade in 1188. Conan (or Cunan) contributed to Patristic literature, as he is credited with the capitula or chapter-headings prefixing each section of St. Bernard's Sermons on the Song of Songs, one of the works for which that author was titled a Doctor of the Church.

The Annales de Margan are a contemporary chronicle in Latin, beginning with the death of Edward the Confessor in 1066 and ending with Henry III's quarrel with Hubert de Burgh in the year 1232. The chief source for the earlier portion was likely William of Malmesbury's history. The text gives accounts of the purported discovery of the bones of King Arthur, and of the alleged murder of Prince Arthur by King John.

Sir John Buchanan-Jardine (third baronet Buchanan-Jardine) recounts a tradition that Margam Abbey kept a pack of hunting hounds donated to them by a continental Abbey (which he takes to be the Abbey of Saint-Hubert).

The abbey was dissolved by King Henry VIII of England in 1536 and sold to Sir Rice Mansel. Significant holdings of the monastery library appear to have survived this event, including the manuscript of the annals. At this time, only 12 monks were living in the monastery. From the Mansel family the abbey eventually passed to their descendants in the female line, the Talbot family. In the 19th century, C R M Talbot constructed a mansion at Margam Castle which overlooks the abbey ruins. The nave of the abbey continued in use as the parish church, as it does to this day. It is Anglo-Catholic in its churchmanship.

== Today ==
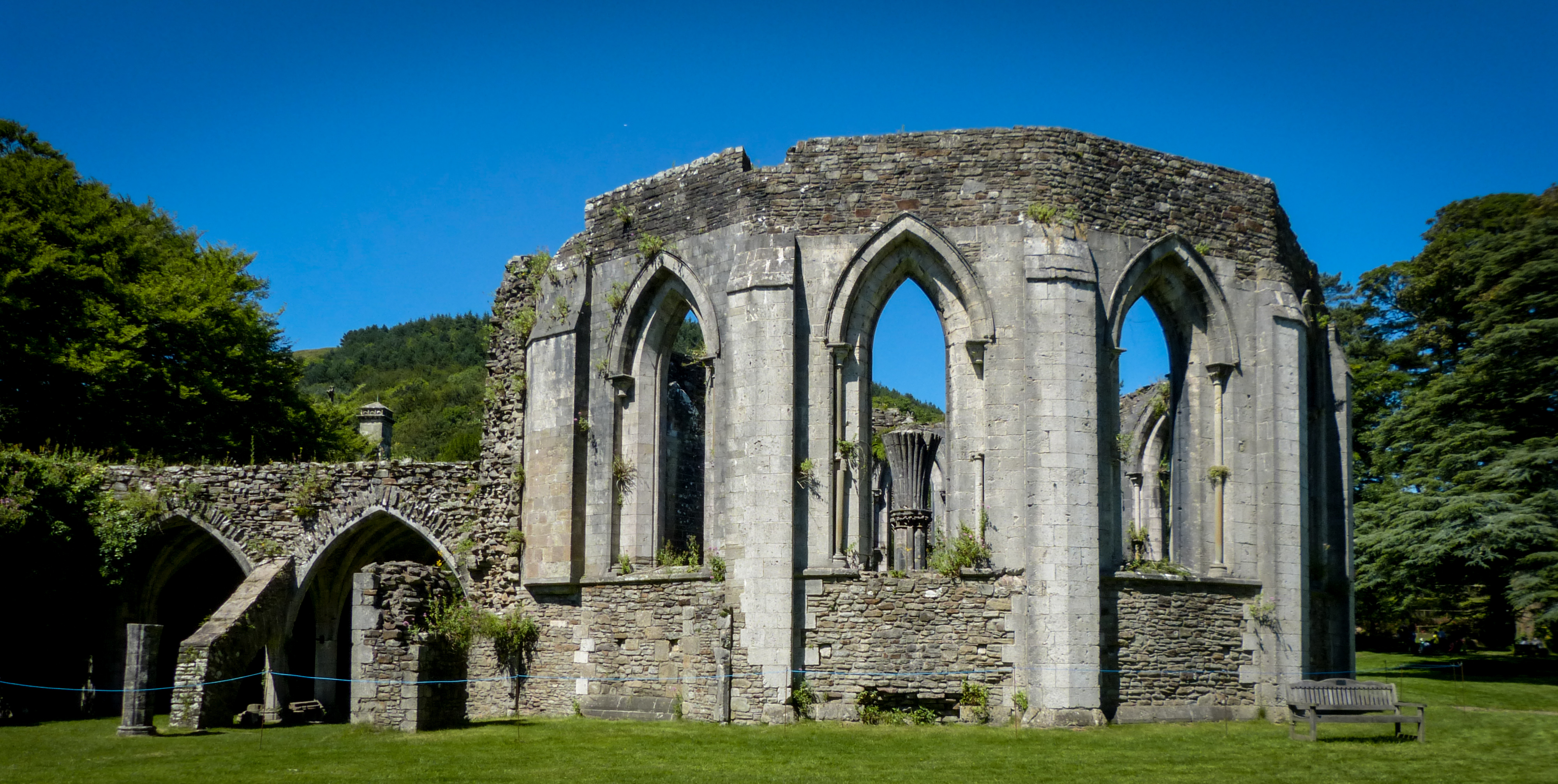
Chapter House ruins

Margam Abbey now consists of the intact nave and surrounding ruins. Those ruins not belonging to the church are now owned by the County Council. These remains, including the twelve-sided chapter house, dating from the 13th century, stand within 840 acre (3.4 km^{2}) Margam Country Park, close to Margam Castle. The Abbey church of St Mary, the ruined Chapter House and the Abbey undercroft are all Grade I listed buildings.

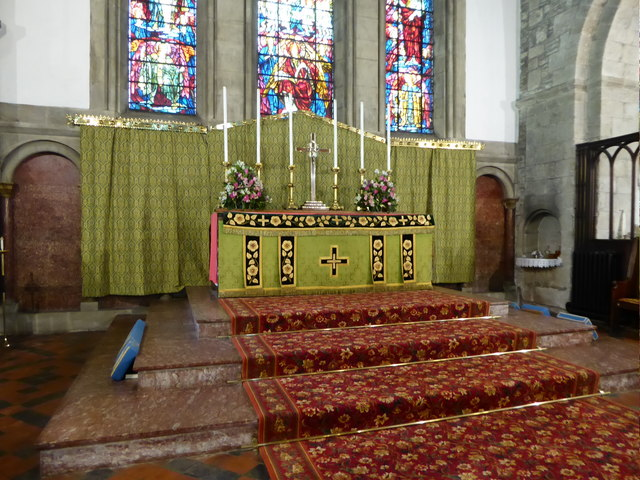
Margam Abbey interior, August 2019

The church is in the Margam Ministry Area and three services are held weekly.

On a hill overlooking the abbey stand the ruins of an outlying monastery building, Capel Mair ar y Bryn ("the chapel of St Mary on the hill"). The purpose of this building is thought to have been to allow members of the monastic community who were engaged in the keeping of flocks to fulfil their devotional obligations without having to return to the main church.

== Tree of the Year 2020 ==
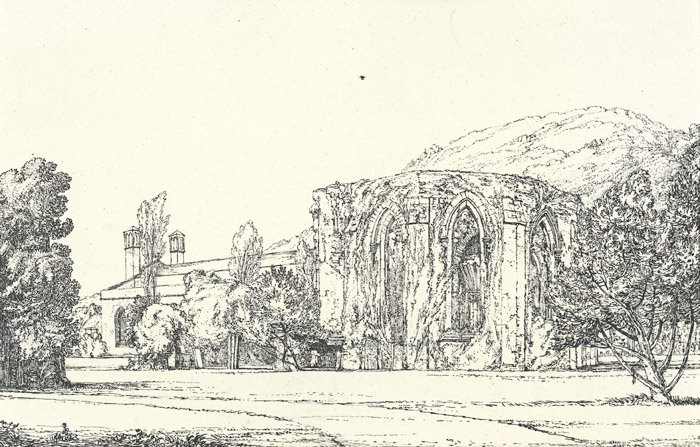
A view of the Chapter House, with trees in the foreground.

In 2020, a beech tree located in the ruins of Margam Abbey was voted Tree of the Year in Wales.

The 'Chapter House Tree' won an online vote conducted by the Welsh Woodland Trust, beating other trees such as the Monmouth Catalpa Tree and the Chirk Castle Sweet Chestnut. It was awarded £1000 as a prize, and received 1118 votes.

== See also ==
- Margam Country Park
- Margam Stones Museum
- List of monastic houses in Wales
- List of Scheduled Monuments in Neath Port Talbot

== Photos ==
- Original Abbey Complex:
- www.geograph.co.uk : photos of Margam Abbey
