= Brocklebank baronets =

Baronetcy in the Baronetage of the United Kingdom

Escutcheon of the Brocklebank baronets of Greenlands and Springwood

The Brocklebank baronetcy, of Greenlands in the parish of Irton in the County of Cumberland and Springwood in the County Palatine of Lancaster, is a title in the Baronetage of the United Kingdom. It was created on 22 July 1885 for Thomas Brocklebank, a deputy lieutenant, high sheriff and justice of the peace for Cumberland. Born Thomas Fisher, he had assumed by Royal licence the surname of Brocklebank (which was that of his maternal grandfather) in lieu of Fisher in 1845.

The Brocklebank family business was T&J Brocklebank Ltd, a shipping company formed early in the 19th century by the sons of Daniel Brocklebank. In 1911, a large shareholding in the company was sold to Edward Bates and Son, and a further acquisition then gave Cunard a controlling interest in Brocklebanks in 1912. The 3rd Baronet was a director of the Cunard Steamship Company, of the Suez Canal Company and of the Great Western Railway. His eldest son, the 4th Baronet, died unmarried and was succeeded by his younger brother, the 5th Baronet. He was chairman of Cunard Ltd between 1959 and 1965.

== Brocklebank baronets, of Greenlands and Springwood (1885) ==
- Sir Thomas Brocklebank, 1st Baronet (1814–1906).
- Sir Thomas Brocklebank, 2nd Baronet (1848–1911)
- Sir Aubrey Brocklebank, 3rd Baronet (1873–1929)#
- Sir Thomas Aubrey Lawies Brocklebank, 4th Baronet (1899–1953)
- Sir John Montague Brocklebank, 5th Baronet (1915–1974)
- Sir Aubrey Thomas Brocklebank, 6th Baronet (born 1952)

The heir apparent is the current holder's son Aubrey William Thomas Brocklebank (born 1980).

== Extended family ==
Harold Brocklebank, third son of the 1st Baronet, built Grizedale Hall in 1905.

Baronetage of the United Kingdom
| Preceded by Bell baronets | Brocklebank baronets of Greenlands and Springwood; 22 July 1885 | Succeeded by Vernon baronets |
