= Vernon baronets of Hanbury Hall (1885) =

Vernon of Hanbury arms: Or, on a fess azure three garbs of the first, in chief a cross-crosslet fitchée gules

The Vernon baronetcy, of Hanbury Hall in Worcestershire was created on 23 July 1885 in the Baronetage of the United Kingdom for Harry Foley Vernon, Member of Parliament for East Worcestershire from 1861 to 1868.

The title became extinct in 1940 on the death of the 2nd Baronet, who left no heir.

== Vernon baronets, of Hanbury Hall (1885) ==
- Sir Harry Vernon, 1st Baronet (1834–1920)
- Captain Sir Bowater George Hamilton Vernon, 2nd Baronet (1865–1940), left no heir. An inquest on his death returned a verdict of suicide.

== Notes ==
Baronetage of the United Kingdom
Preceded by Brocklebank baronets	Vernon baronets of Hanbury Hall; 23 July 1885	Succeeded by Harland baronets
