= Castor (1782 ship) =

Merchant ship

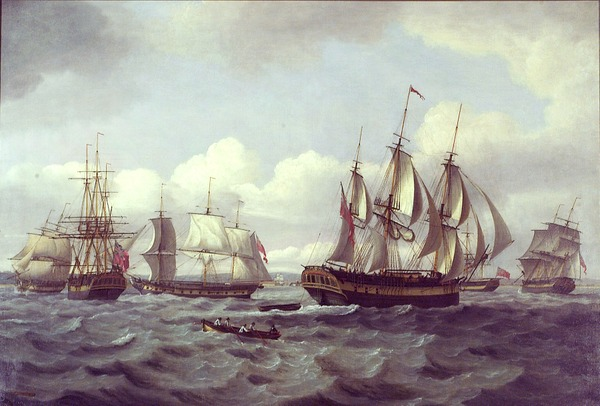
- Castor and other vessels in a choppy sea; Thomas Luny, 1802, National Maritime Museum (Note: The ship in the foreground to the right of the painting above bears the name Castor on her stern. It is likely that this is the Castor that Spedding and Co., of Whitehaven, built in 1782.)

History

Great Britain
- Name: Castor
- Namesake: Castor
- Owner: Daniel Brocklebank (Note: One source gives the owner as Captain Salkeld, but the earliest listings in Lloyd's Register give the owner as Brocklebank.); 1793: Thompson; 1799: Curling & Co.
- Builder: Spedding & Co., Whitehaven (Note: One source gives the builder as Brocklebank, however Daniel Brocklebank did not start building ships at Whitehaven until 1785.)
- Launched: 1782
- Fate: Last listed in Lloyd's Register in 1808, and in the Register of Shipping in 1809

General characteristics
- Tons burthen: Originally: 343; Post-1799:46715/94, (bm)
- Complement: 35
- Armament: 16 × 6-pounder guns + 6 × swivel guns

Castor was a merchantman launched in 1782 that played a significant role in the maritime trade during the late 18th century. The ship was associated with the British East India Company (EIC) and underwent several ownership changes before being last listed in 1808.

Lloyd's Register

Year	Master	Owner	Trade	Notes
1789	J. Storey	Brocklebank	Whitehaven - West Indies	400 tons (bm)
1790	J. Storey; J. Stalkheld	Brocklebank	Whitehaven - Jamaica	
1791	J. Stalkheld	Brocklebank	London - Madeira	
1792	J. Stalkeld	Thompson	Hull - New York	
1793	J. Stalkeld	Thompson	Hull - New York; London - Jamaica	
1794	J. Stalkeld	Thompson	London - Jamaica	
1795	J. Stalkeld	Thompson	London - Martinique	18 × 6-pounder guns
1796	J. Stalkeld	Thompson	London - Martinique	18 × 6-pounder guns

On 10 September 1793, Captain Joseph Salkeld, received a letter of marque for Castor.

Salkeld sailed Castor from Portsmouth on 17 May 1796, bound for Bengal. She reached the Cape on 2 August and remained there until 10 December. She arrived at Calcutta on 8 March 1797. Homeward bound, she was at Diamond Harbour on 7 June, and reached St Helena on 3 September. She left St Helena on 26 September and arrived at The Downs on 30 January 1798. Castor was at Ramsgate on 6 February 1798.

Lloyd's List for 2 February reported that Castor, Salkeld, master, from Bengal, had been run afoul of by Minerva, Blaney, master, in The Downs. Castor was onshore at Ramsgate, and the cargo was expected to be saved. The EIC reported that part of the cargo was saved, and put the value of the cargo that it had lost on Castor at £7878.

By one report, her owners sold Castor to Dutch owners in 1800. Salkeld had by then become master of Minerva and was on his way to Australia, transporting convicts. That same source states that in 1802 Curling and Co., of London, purchased Castor for use as a West Indiaman.

However, by 1799 Curling & Co. already owned Castor. Her master was Mackenzie, and her trade London - Jamaica. She had been lengthened in 1796, and as a result, her burthen was now 467 tons. She had also undergone a thorough repair in 1799. Apparently her new owners chose not to arm her, let alone apply for a letter of marque.

Lloyd's Register

Year	Master	Owner	Trade
1799	M'Kenzie	Curling & Co.	London - Jamaica
1800	M'Kenzie	Curling & Co.	London - Jamaica
1801	M'Kenzie	Curling & Co.	London - Jamaica
1802	M'Kenzie; A. Sibald	Curling & Co.	London - Jamaica
1803	A. Sibald	Curling & Co.	London - Amsterdam
1804	A. Sibald	Curling & Co.	London - Amsterdam
1805	A. Sibald	Curling & Co.	London - Amsterdam
1806	A. Sibald	Curling & Co.	London - Amsterdam
1807	A. Sibald	Curling & Co.	London - Amsterdam
1808	A. Sibald	Curling & Co.	London - Amsterdam
1809		No longer listed	

Register of Shipping

Year	Master	Owner	Trade
1806	A. Sibald	Curling & Co.	London - Jamaica
1809	A. Sibald	Curling & Co.	London - Jamaica
1810		No longer listed	
