= Bell baronets of Rounton Grange and Washington Hall (1885) =

Escutcheon of the Bell baronets of Rounton Grange and Washington Hall

The Bell baronetcy, of Rounton Grange in the County of York and Washington Hall in the County of Durham, was created in the Baronetage of the United Kingdom on 21 July 1885 for the ironmaster and Liberal politician Lowthian Bell.

He was succeeded by his son, the 2nd Baronet, was Mayor of Middlesbrough for many years and also served as Lord-Lieutenant of the North Riding of Yorkshire between 1906 and 1931. His son from his first marriage, the 3rd Baronet, was a colonel in the 4th Battalion of the Yorkshire Regiment and fought in the Second Boer War and in the First World War; he was High Sheriff of Durham in 1921. He died unmarried and was succeeded by his nephew, the 4th Baronet. He was the son of Rev. Hugh Lowthian Bell, only son from the second marriage of the 2nd Baronet. As of 2026 the title is held by his son, the 5th Baronet, who succeeded in 1970.

== Bell baronets, of Rounton Grange and Washington Hall (1885) ==
- Sir (Isaac) Lowthian Bell, 1st Baronet (1810–1904).
- Sir (Thomas) Hugh Bell, CB, 2nd Baronet (1844–1931).
- Sir Maurice Hugh Lowthian Bell, CMG. 3rd Baronet (1871–1944)
- Sir Hugh Francis Bell, 4th Baronet (1923–1970).
- Sir John Lowthian Bell, 5th Baronet (born 1960)

The heir apparent is the present holder's son John Hugh Bell (born 1988).

== Extended family ==
Gertrude Bell was the daughter of the 2nd Baronet from his first marriage..

== Notes ==
Baronetage of the United Kingdom
Preceded by Jardine baronets	Bell baronets of Rounton Grange and Washington Hall; 21 July 1885	Succeeded by Brocklebank baronets
