= Margam Stones Museum =

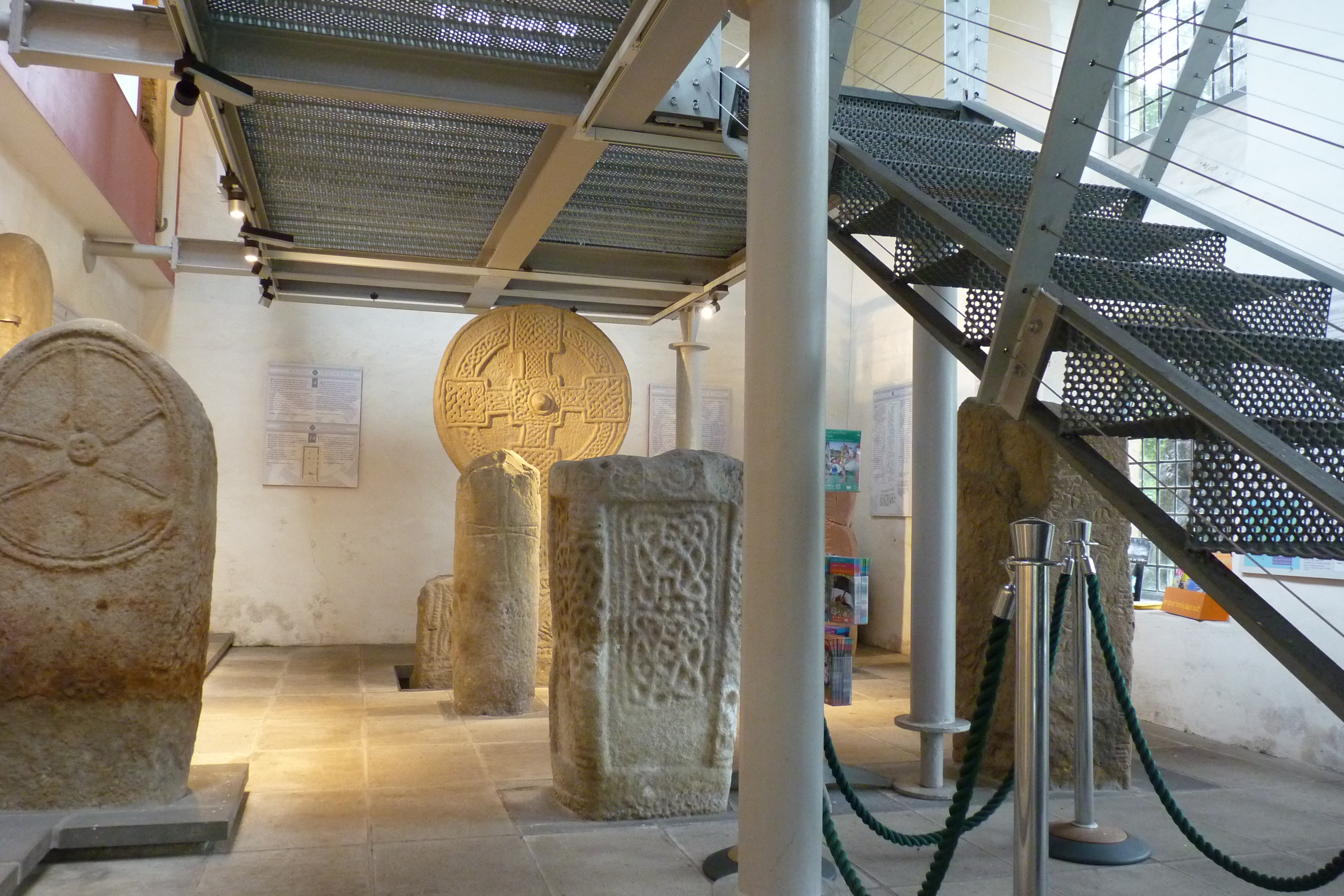

- Museum location in Neath Port Talbot, South Wales
- Established: 1892 (1932 in current building)
- Location: SS80078632, Port Talbot, South Wales, SA13 2TA
- Coordinates: 51.56327°N 3.73057°W
- Type: Museum of early Christian carved stones
- Curator: Cadw
- Parking: On site (free)
- Website: cadw.wales.gov.uk

Margam Stones Museum is a small Victorian schoolhouse near Port Talbot, South Wales, which now provides a home for one of the most important collections of Celtic stone crosses in Britain. All originally found within the locality of Margam, and mostly assembled as a collection in the 19th century, they provide enduring testimony to a Welsh Christian culture between the 6th and 16th centuries. The striking Cross of Conbelin is the most celebrated example. From around 1000 AD, it is a huge disc cross with Celtic interlace and plaitwork patterns, figurative scenes including a hunting scene, and inscriptions telling us who made it and who erected it. There are 17 early Christian stones, plus 11 memorials and other stones from the post-Norman periods. The museum is run by Cadw, the Welsh historic sites agency, and is close to Margam Abbey Church and the ruins of the Abbey buildings.

== Access ==
Postcode: SA13 2TA. Access road is just north of J38 of the M4, 4 miles (6.4 km) south-east of Port Talbot. There is a car park for visitors to the Abbey, Museum and Abbots Kitchen Restaurant.

== History of the museum ==
Margam Abbey was a Cistercian Abbey founded in 1147, and the nave survives as Margam Parish Church. Upon its dissolution in 1536 the Mansel family acquired it, and built a mansion in the grounds. In 1786 it passed by marriage to the Talbot family of Lacock, Wiltshire, and it is they, during the 19th century, who began to gather together various stone crosses and standing stones in the locality. Initially they were placed in the mansion grounds. In 1892 Emily Talbot gave them to the nation, in the care of the Commissioner of Public Works. In 1932 they were moved into their present building, a former Church schoolhouse close to Margam Abbey Church. Other stones from the Abbey and the local area were added to the collection, which is now in the care of Cadw.

== The Stones ==
Source locations for the Margam Stones (where known).
1 Margam Stones Museum
2 Pumpeius Stone (Kenfig)
3 Bodvoc Stone
4 Cwrt Uchaf (4, Pillar of Thomas; also 9 and 16)
5 Margam Church and churchyard (5,6,7, 8 and 15)
6 Cwrt-y-defaid (10, 11: Ilci and Ilquici crosses)
7 Port Talbot Railway Station (cross 12)
8 Eglwys Nunydd (Cart wheel cross 13)

Of the 30 or so ancient carved stones in the museum, 17 are pre-Norman, and are displayed on the ground floor. The remainder are Margam Abbey memorials, housed in the upper gallery, and are mainly tomb slabs. They include Cistercian and post-reformation memorials.

The pre-Norman stones form a distinct local group of early Christian carvings and inscribed text, and are described as one of the most important such collections in Britain. Ten of these stones originate from Margam and its outlying settlements. Four others came from the area that became the Port Talbot steelworks, and three are from the hills and farms of the wider area.

The stones in the museum are part of a much larger group of carved and inscribed stones found across Glamorgan dating to the early Christian centuries. They can be classified into three groupings:

Latin inscribed memorials
These date from 450 to 650 AD, and indicate an early Welsh Christian culture. The three stone pillars in the museum provide early text including a Welsh family tree, and a stone with both Latin and Ogham inscriptions.
Cross inscribed slabs
Dating from 600 to 900 AD and crudely produced compared to the sculptured crosses, they have outline crosses cut into the stone.
Sculptured crosses and cross slabs
From 900 to 1100 AD, these have detailed patterns of lattice or plaitwork, and include a number of inscriptions in Latin. They are the most visually dramatic group within the museum, and are the bulk of the pre-Norman collection.

== Latin inscribed memorials ==
=== No. 1. Roman Milepost and post-Roman memorial ===
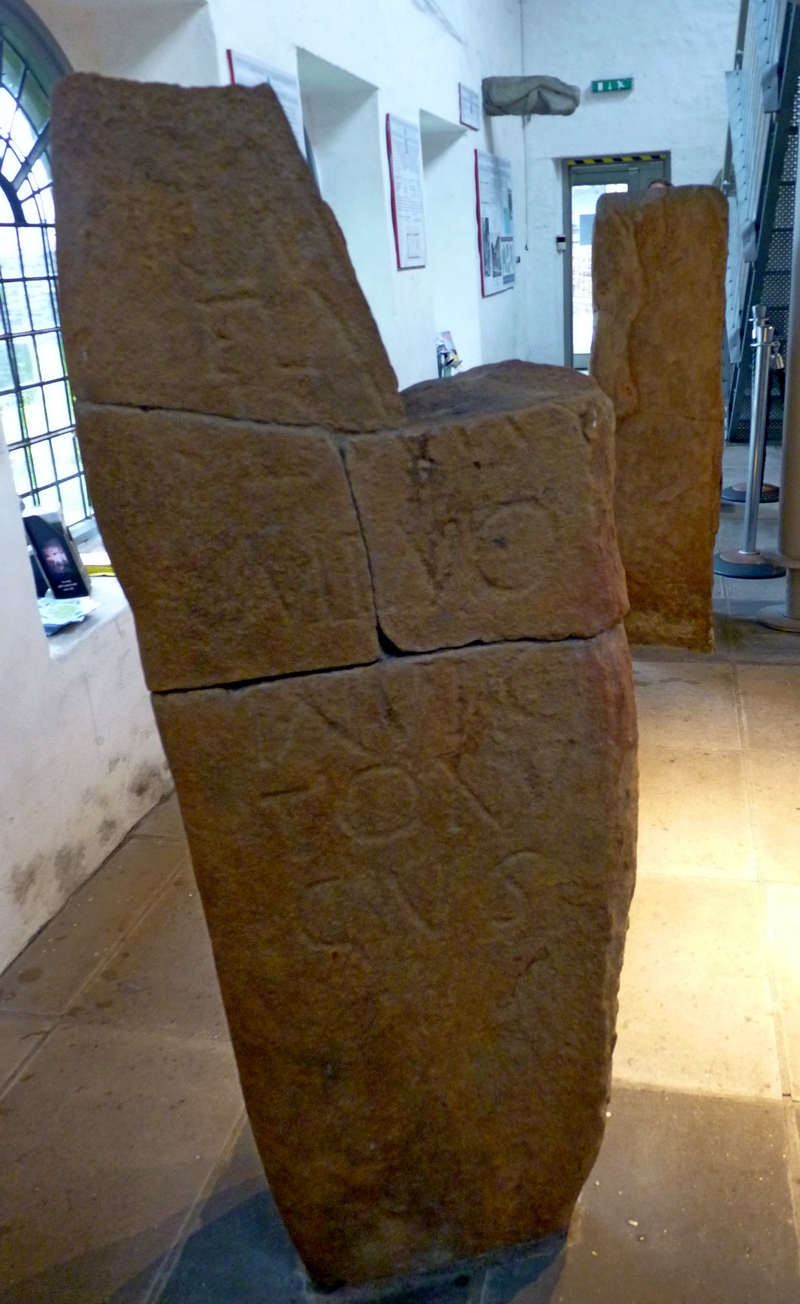
Roman Milestone

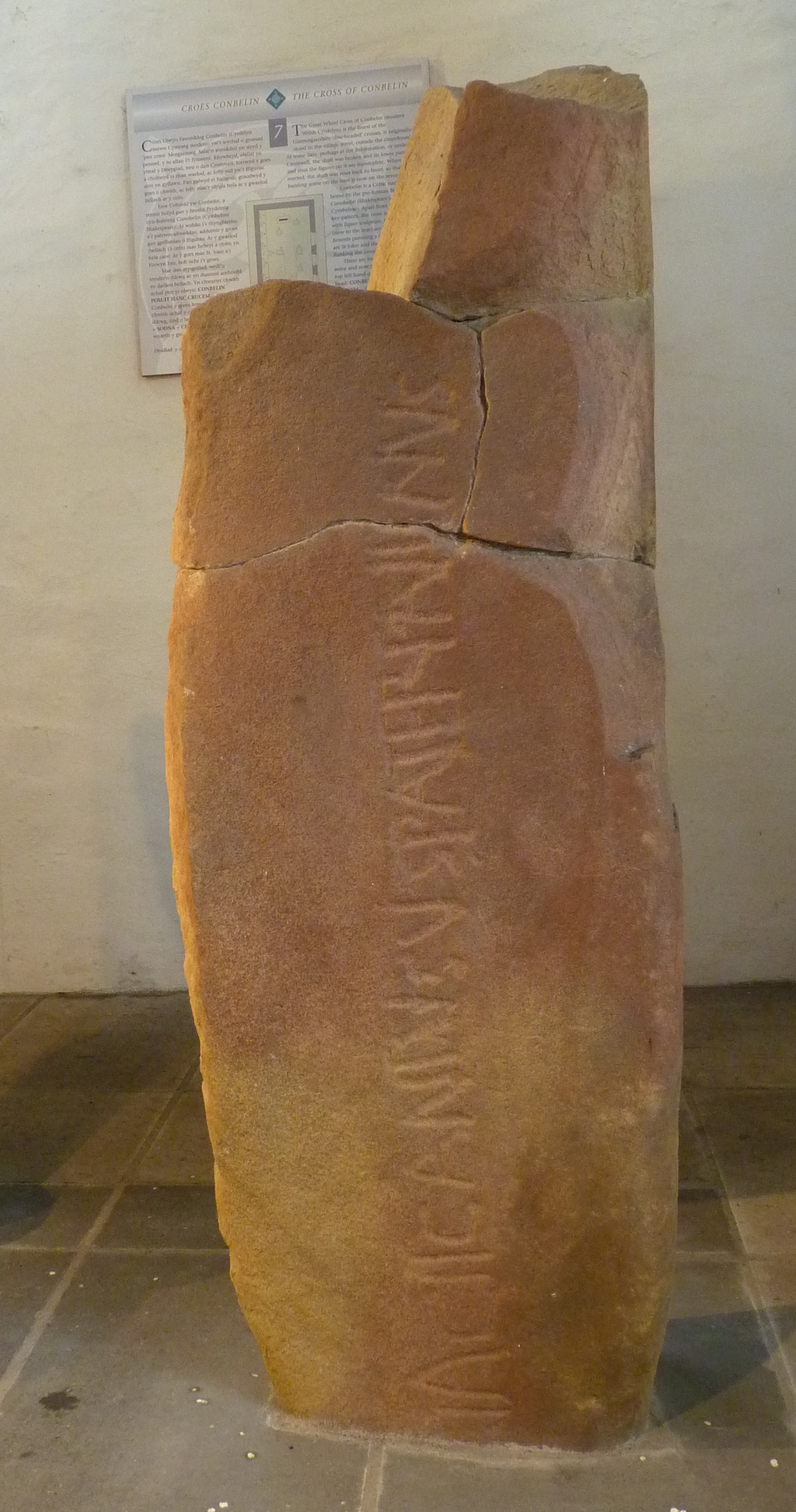
Roman Milestone reverse side

The milestone dates to 309–313, the dates for Emperor Maximinus. It was turned upside-down and re-used in the 6th century, when a memorial to Cantusus was inscribed. It is a sandstone pillar, 1.52 metres (5.0 ft) high, and 0.48 metres (1.6 ft) by 0.25 metres (0.82 ft), first noted in 1839.

Inscription, Side A
IMPC[easar] FLA[vio]MAX MINO INVIC TO AV GVS[to]

In expanded form this translates as '(Set up in the reign of) the Emperor Caesar Flavius Valerius Maximinus, the Unconquered, Augustus'.

Inscription Side B
HIC IACIT CANTVSVS PATER PAVLINVS
translates as 'Here lies Cantusus – his father was Paulinus.'
Location
It was found in 1839 at the Roman Road near Port Talbot. The missing pieces (top corner and lower tip) were lost soon after discovery, but a full transcription of both sides had been made.

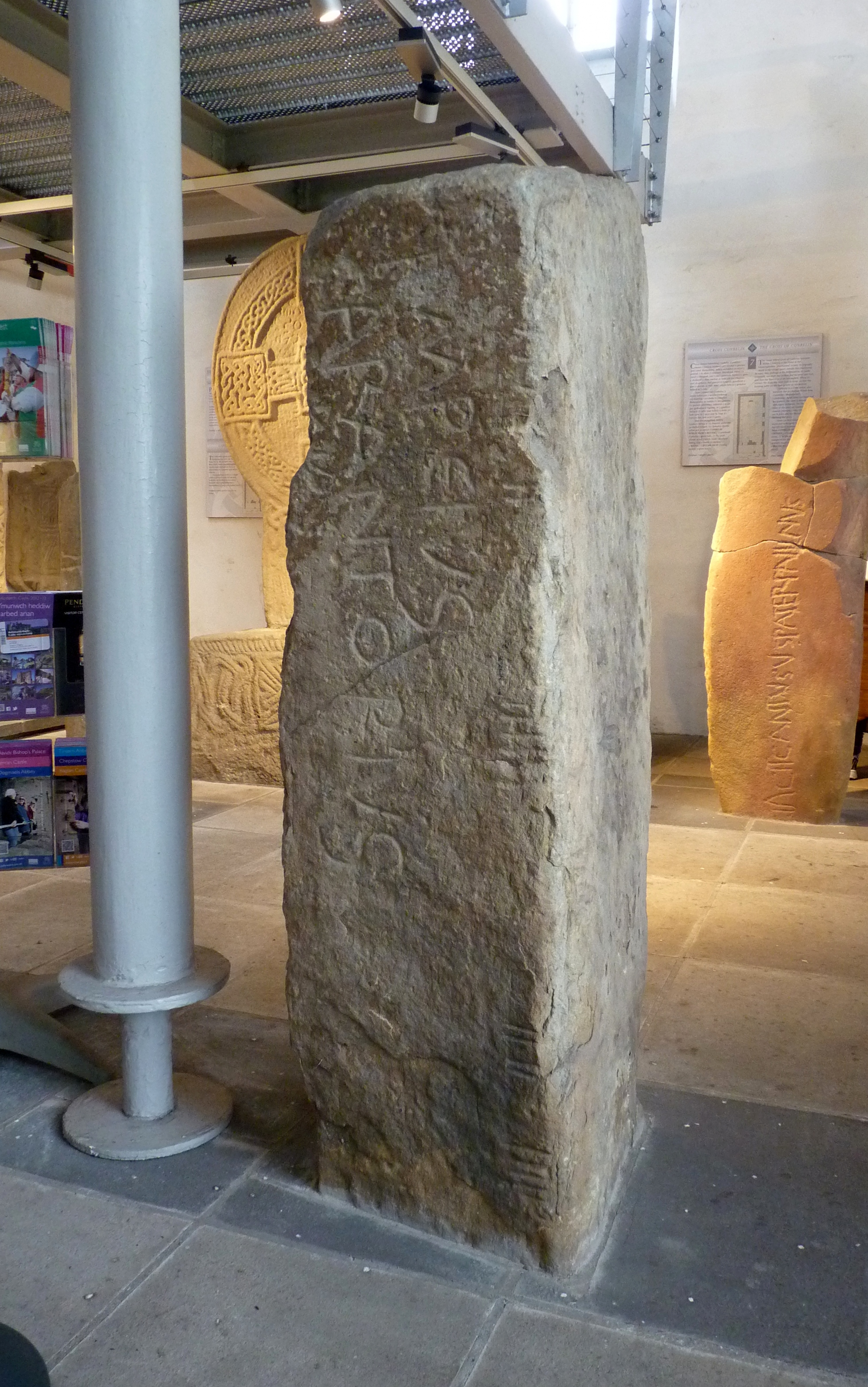
Pumpeius Stone

=== No. 2. Stone of Pumpeius Carantorius ===
This stone is also known as the Pumpeius Stone, the Kenfig Stone, and by local tradition 'Bêdh Morgan Morganwg' (The sepulchre of Prince Morgan). It was first recorded in 1578. A squared pillar of Old Red Sandstone, 1.35 metres (4.4 ft) tall, it contains both Latin and Ogham scripts. Two areas of Ogham script appear, written as notches along the side of the stone, on the same face as the Latin name.

Date
6th century
Inscription
Latin: PUMPEIVS CARANTORIVS (An expansion of this gives '[The stone of] Pumpeius, [son of] Carantorius'. These are a Roman and a Latinised British name.)
Ogham (top left) transliterates as P[AM]P[E]S (taken to be a repetition of 'Pumpeius')
Ogham (right side) ROL[ACU]N M[A]Q ILL[U]NA (translated as 'Rolacun son of Illuna', two Irish names)
Location
The stone previously stood beside Water Street, Kenfig, near Eglwys Nunydd, a ruined church 1 mile (1.6 km) south of Margam. (Coordinates 51.5450°N 3.7267°W, grid reference SS 8036 8433 It may have been nearer the ruined church until the 18th century. It was moved from its roadside location to the museum some time between 1928 and 1945.

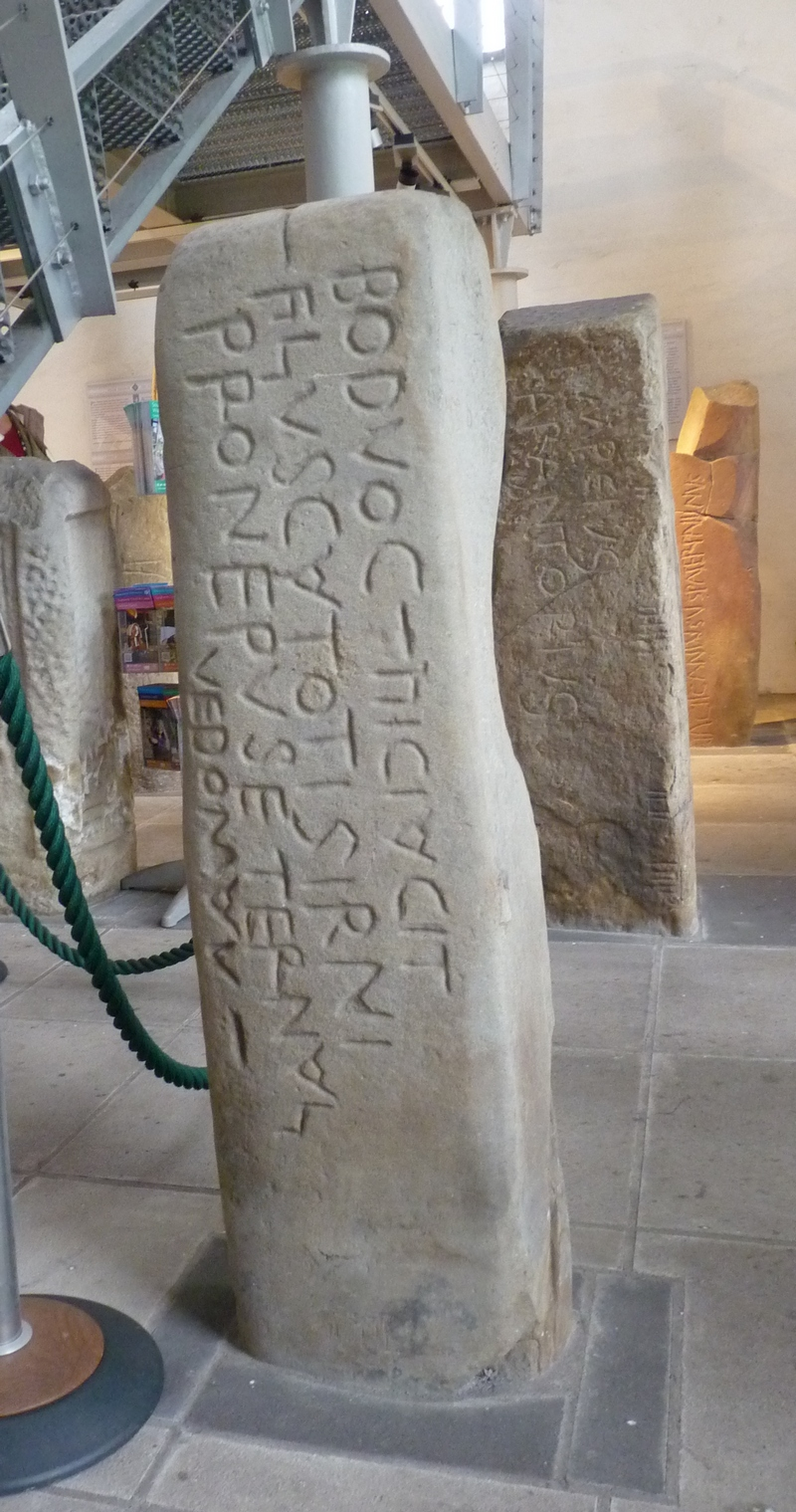
Bodvoc Stone

=== No. 3. Bodvoc Stone ===
A stone pillar also known as 'The Margam Stone', and 'Carreg Lythyrenog'. It originates from a nearby mountain location, set into a prehistoric burial mound, where a replica now stands. It was first documented in 1578, and local folk-lore declared that anyone reading the inscription would die soon afterwards. It is a stone pillar, 1.01 metres (3.3 ft) high, with four lines of Latin inscription and an incised cross. On the back there is an Ordnance Survey bench mark, and various more recent carvings. It was moved to the museum before 1945.

Date
Late 6th or early 7th century
Inscription
BODVOCI HIC IACIT FILIUS CATOTIGIRNI PRONEPUS ETERNALI VEDOMAVI
translates as '[The Stone] of Bodvoc. Here he lies, son of Cattegern [or Cattegirn], and great-grandson of Eternalis Vedomavus'.
decoration
A small incised Maltese cross is on the top surface of the pillar. This may be of the same date as the inscription.
Location
It originally stood on a cairn on Margam Mountain, between Bridgend and Maesteg. The Ordnance Survey cut a bench mark on it, and graffiti was also carved onto the stone, before it was moved to the museum, with a replica replacing it at its original location (coordinates 51.5857°N 3.6893°W, grid reference SS 8306 8878).

== Cross inscribed slabs ==
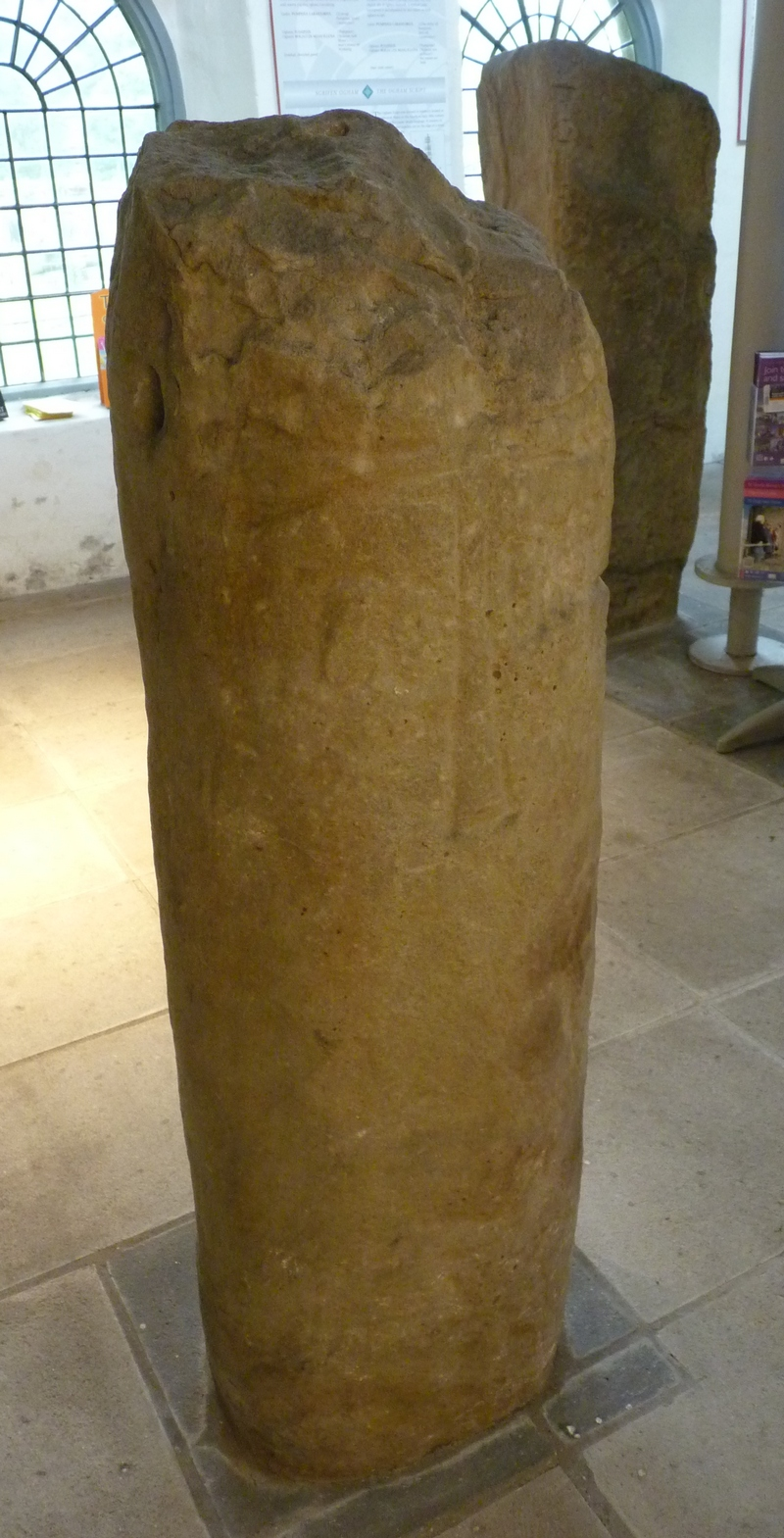
Pillar of Thomas

These date from 600 to 900 AD and are crudely produced compared to the later sculptured crosses. Several of the Margam stones feature these incised carvings, including No 3, and the back of No 13. Only No 4 falls purely within this category.

=== No. 4. Pillar of Thomas ===
A tall cylindrical stone pillar with the top broken and missing. Three outline Latin crosses are cut in, and a short inscription. The pillar is 1.14 metres (3.7 ft) high, with a diameter of 0.38 metres (1.2 ft), tapering slightly towards the base. It was discovered 'under a hedge' at Cwrt Uchaf Farm in 1857, before being moved to join the Margam collection.

Date
8th to early 9th century
Inscription
TO ME

'Thomas' (implying 'The cross of Thomas', which could be a reference to the apostle or a local namesake.)

Location
It is from Cwrt Uchaf Farm, Port Talbot (Now under the steelworks).

== Sculptured crosses and cross slabs ==
These date from 900 to 1100 AD, and form the great majority of the Margam early Christian collection. Seven of them are from the immediate environs of Margam, and three are from the same location as the Pillar of Thomas, implying perhaps two pre-Norman monastic establishments in the area, using the local sandstone to create distinctive Celtic stone sculpture.

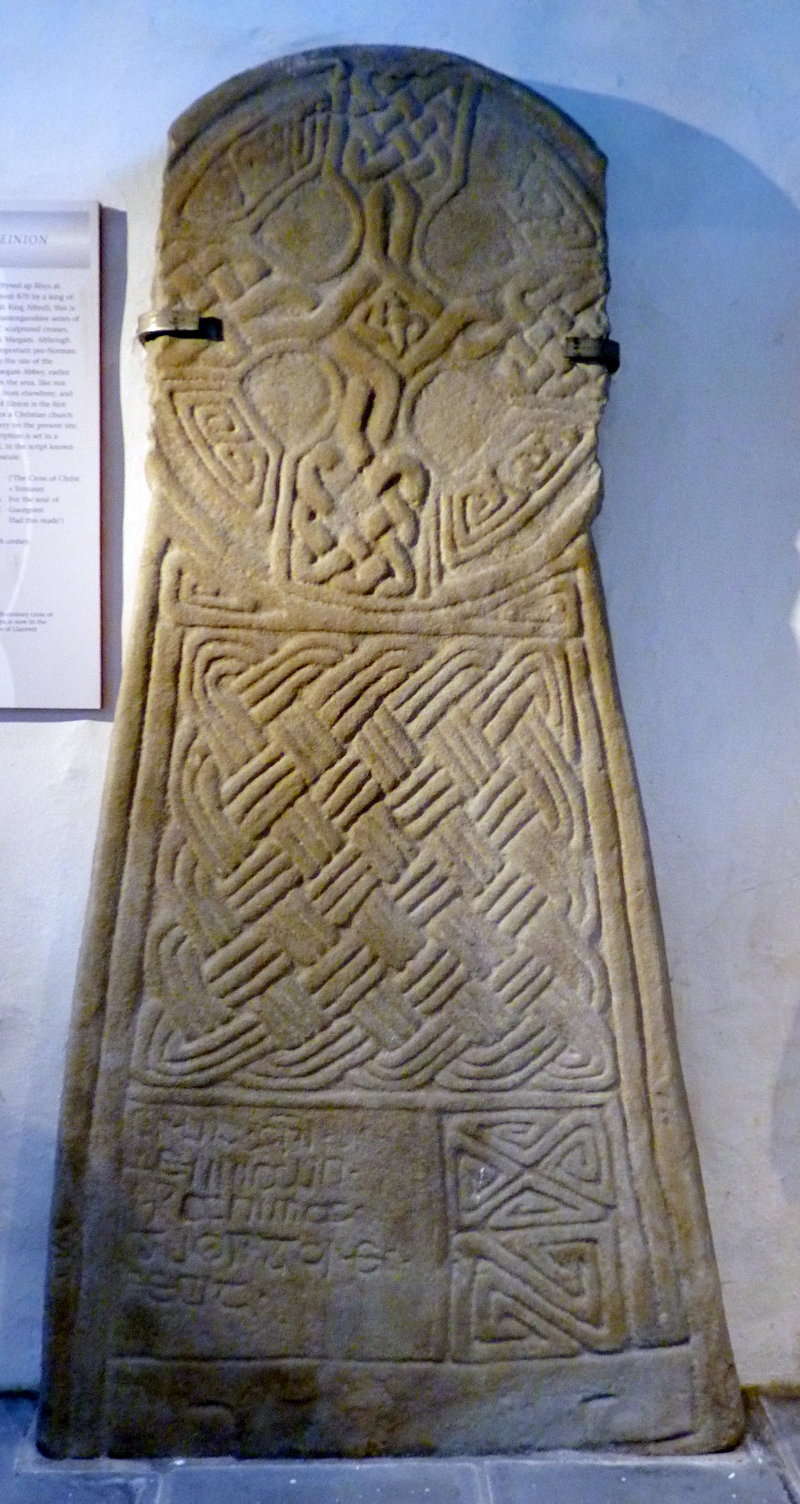
Cross of Einion

=== No. 5. Cross of Einion ===
The earliest of the Glamorgan disc-headed crosses (along with one at Llantwit Major). The cross and stem have intricate lattice patterns with an inscription in insular majuscule script. First mention of this cross was in 1873, by which time it was in the Abbey Chapter house collection. It measures 1.88 metres (6.2 ft)high, 0.96 metres (3.1 ft) wide and 0.13 metres (0.43 ft) thick, made from locally occurring Pennant sandstone. The circular head of the cross has been roughly cut back to make it a more even shape for re-use as building material.

Date
late 9th century
Decoration
Square headed ringed cross, Geometric ribbon interlace and geometric key pattern.
Inscription
CRUX XPI +ENNIAUN P[RO] ANIMA GUORGORET FECIT

'The Cross of Christ +Enniaun For the soul of Guorgorest Had this made'

Location
Margam. This provides the earliest evidence of a Christian Monastery at this site.

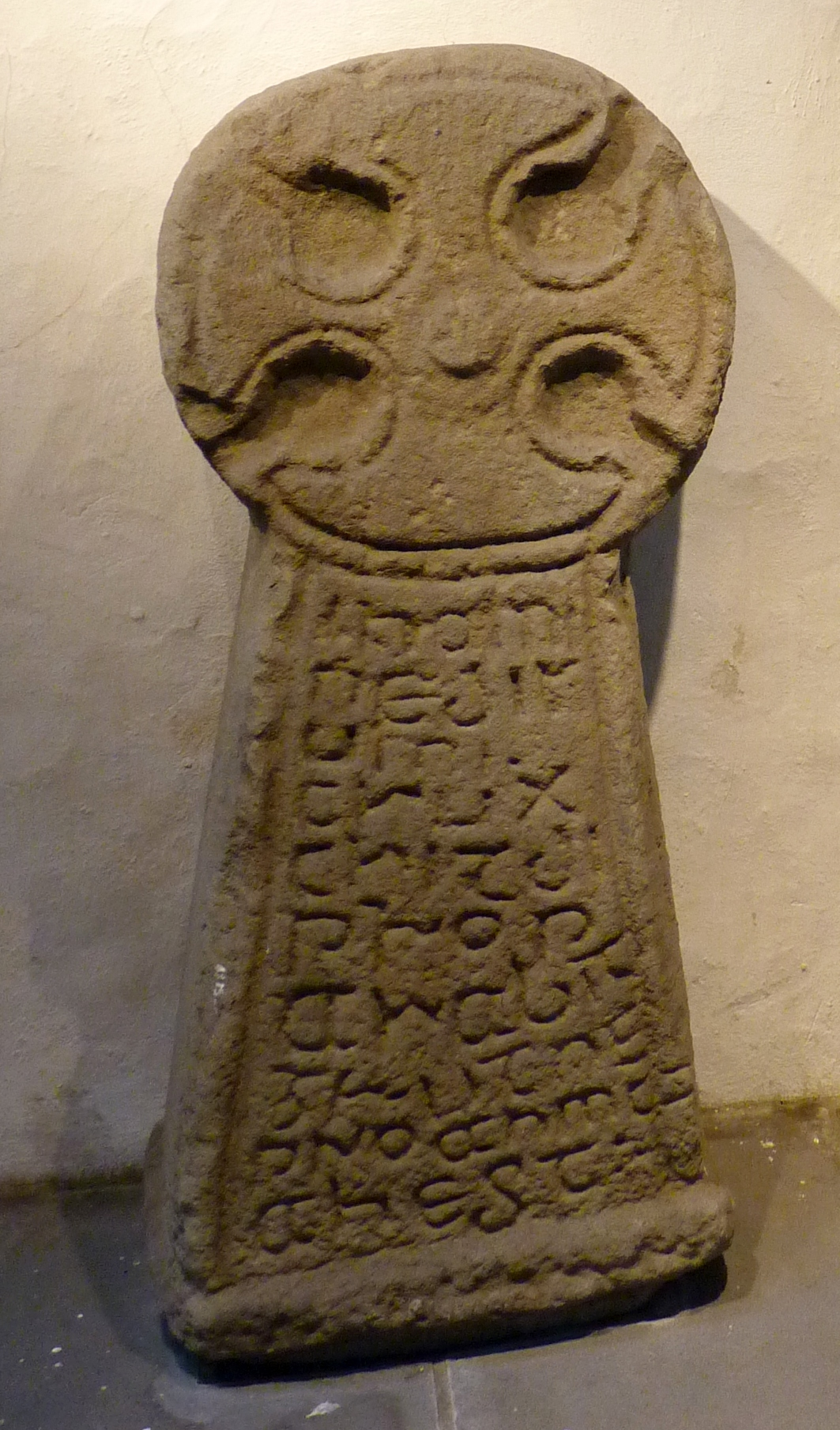
No 6. Cross of Grutne

=== No. 6. Cross of Grutne ===
A disc-headed sculptured cross, with an inscription which fills the cross stem. First mentioned in 1697, it was in Margam Abbey Churchyard, south of the Church, until it was moved into the museum. It is 1.01 metres (3.3 ft)high, 0.48 metres (1.6 ft) wide and 0.3 metres (0.98 ft) thick, made from locally occurring Pennant sandstone. The cross head is 0.44 metres (1.4 ft) in diameter. It is made from a single piece of Pennant sandstone, although a thin tenon on its base suggests it was made to fit into a pedestal socket. Stylistically the splayed arms and wide circular armpits are similar to 10th-century crosses from the north of England.

Date: 10th century

Inscription
I[N] NOMI NE D[E]IS UM[M]I CRUX CRITDI PROP ARABIT GRUTNE PRO AN[I]MA AHEST

'In the name of God the most High This cross of Christ was erected by Grutne for the soul of Ahest'

Location
Margam Churchyard

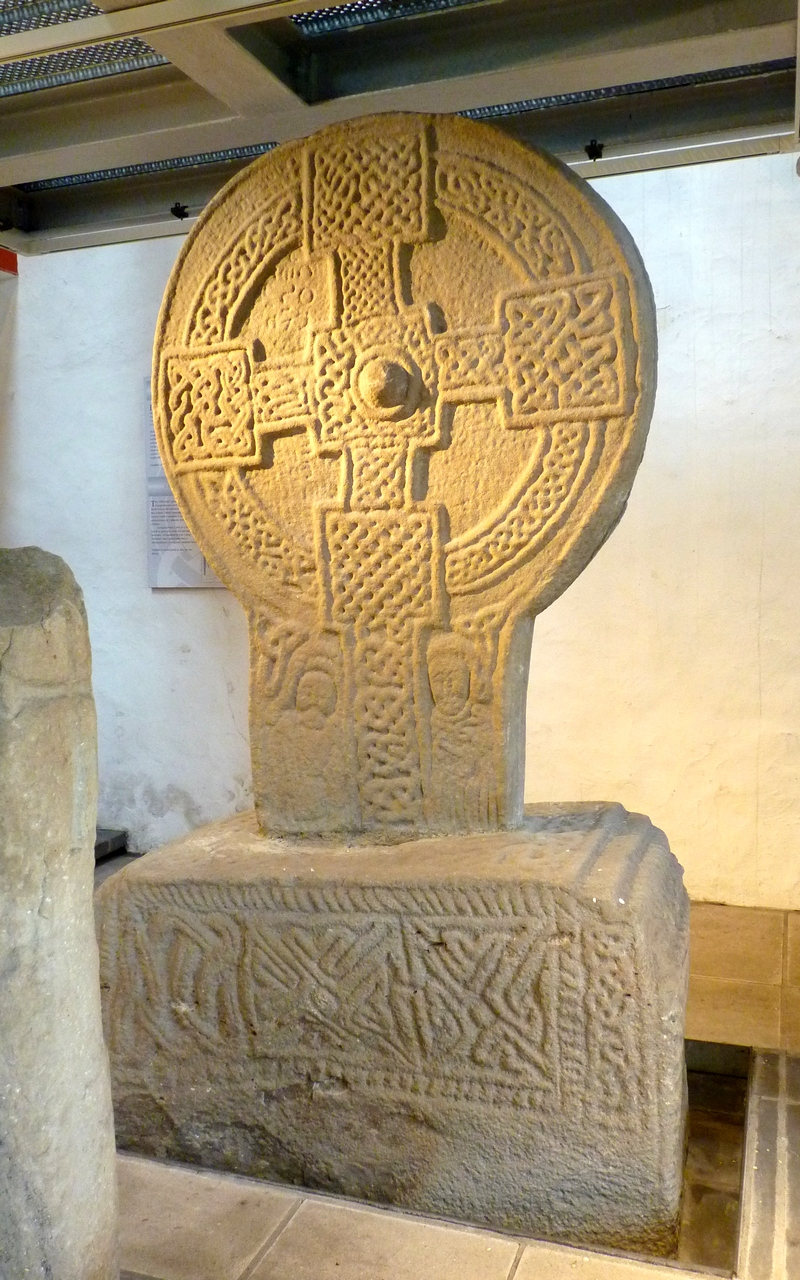
No 7. The Cross of Conbelin

=== No. 7. Cross of Conbelin ===
The largest of the Margam Stones, and with the most decorative and figurative carvings, the RCAHMW describe it as "the most impressive of the monuments of this category in the county, if not in all Wales". It has an immense stone wheel-cross with knot-work arcs, plaitwork cross, and a central boss. The shaft includes carved figures flanking the cross, taken to be St John holding his gospel, and the virgin Mary. This is set into a massive stone pedestal block with intricate geometrical patterns and a hunting scene which would originally have formed the front, but was at some point reversed, so is now at the back of the pedestal. Both parts are made from Pennant sandstone and it has been known traditionally as 'The Sanctuary Stone'.

Date
Some time between 950 and 1050 AD.
Dimensions
Total height is 2.61 metres (8.6 ft). The head and shaft are a single stone, 1.85 metres (6.1 ft) high (with a further 13 centimetres (5.1 in) within the pedestal socket). The shaft was originally longer by perhaps 18 centimetres (7.1 in), probably re-socketed before the Reformation. The head is 1.07 metres (3.5 ft) in diameter, and some 28 centimetres (11 in) thick. The pedestal is rectangular, 0.67 metres (2.2 ft) high, 1.2 metres (3.9 ft) wide, and 0.63 metres (2.1 ft) deep.
Inscriptions
1, within the top-left quadrant of the cross: CONBELIN P[O]SUIT HANC CRUCEM (P[RO] [A]NIMA RI[C?])

'Conbelin erected this cross for the soul of Ric...'

2, on the upper left ring margin: + SODNA + CRUCEM FECIT

Sodna made this cross.

Location
It was first documented in 1690 and in 1798 it was leaning against the wall of a cottage outside Margam churchyard. By 1879 it had been moved by the Talbot family into the Chapter House ruins of the Abbey, and in 1932 was transferred to the Museum building.

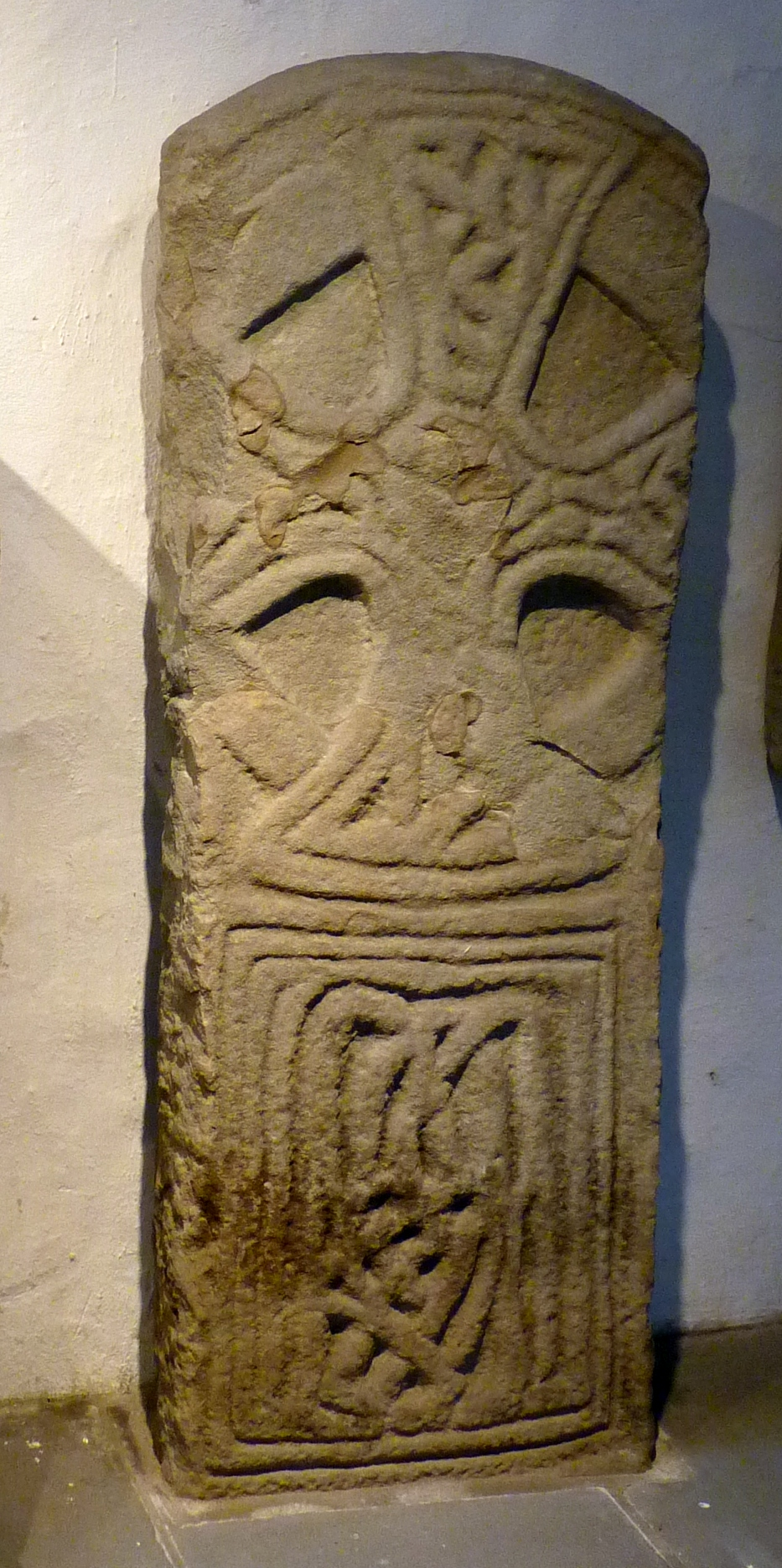
No 8. Disc-headed slab cross

=== No. 8. Disc-headed slab cross ===
The sides of this cross have been trimmed back, probably to use for building material. The cross and stem have decorative interlace panels.

Date
10th to early 11th century
Location
Margam.

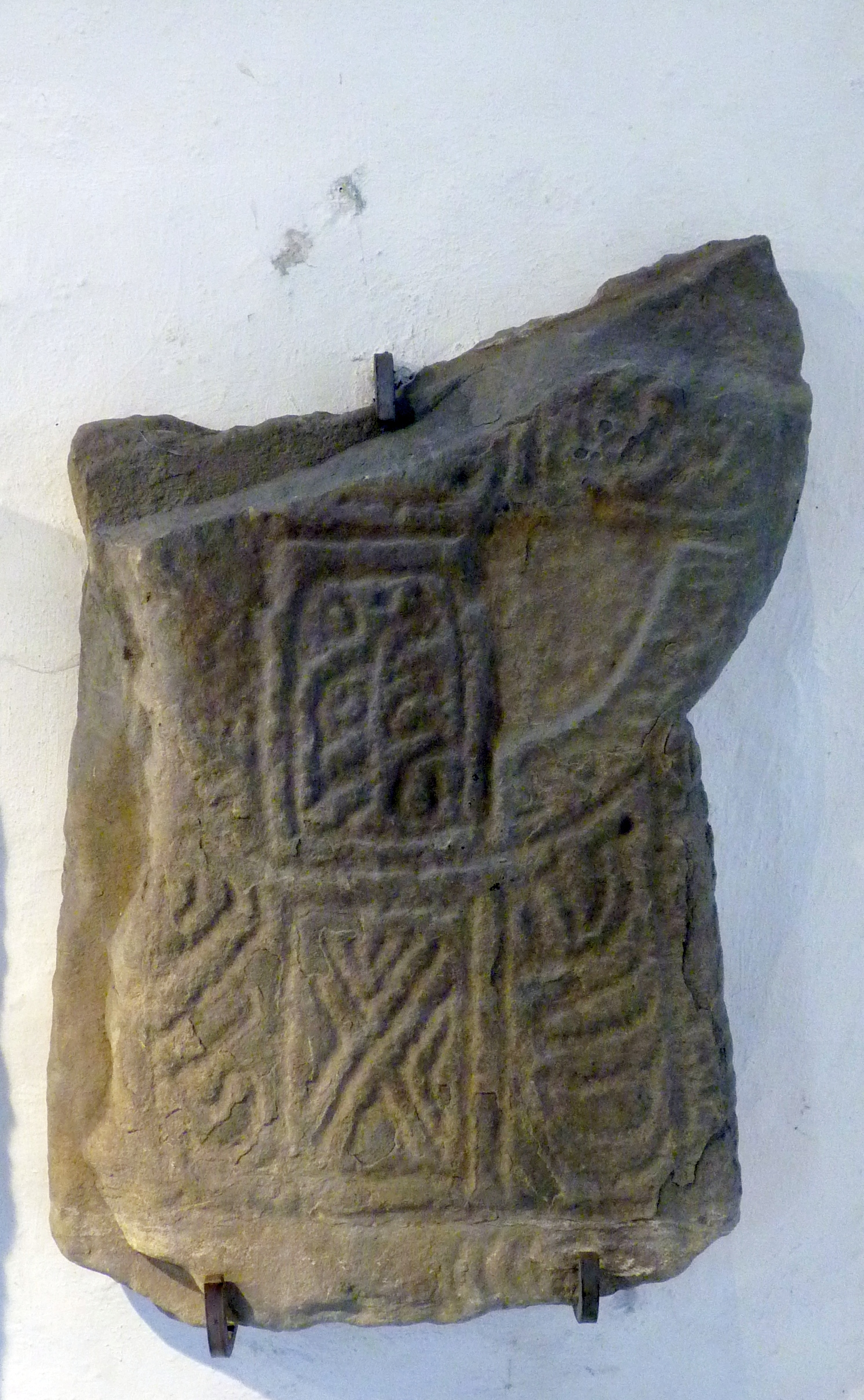
No 9. Disc-headed slab cross

=== No. 9. Disc-headed slab cross ===
This cross head has suffered considerable damage, such that less than half of the circular head of the cross remains. It has a crude interlace pattern.

Date
11th
Location
From Cwrt Uchaf Farm, Port Talbot (Now under the steelworks)

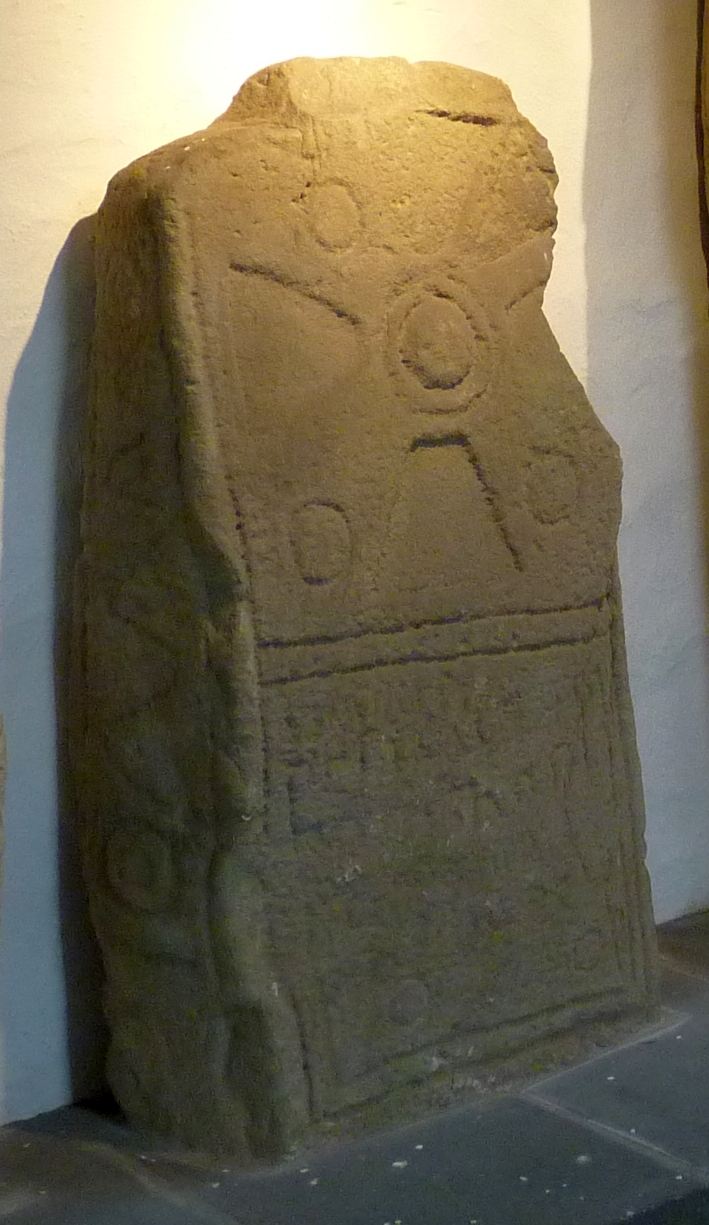
No 10. Cartwheel cross

=== No.10. Cart-wheel Cross ===
So-called 'pannelled cart-wheel cross' with an illegible inscription.

Date
11th century
Location
Stood at 'St Nyddid's Church' (Eglwys Nunydd, long ruined) between Margam and Kenfig.

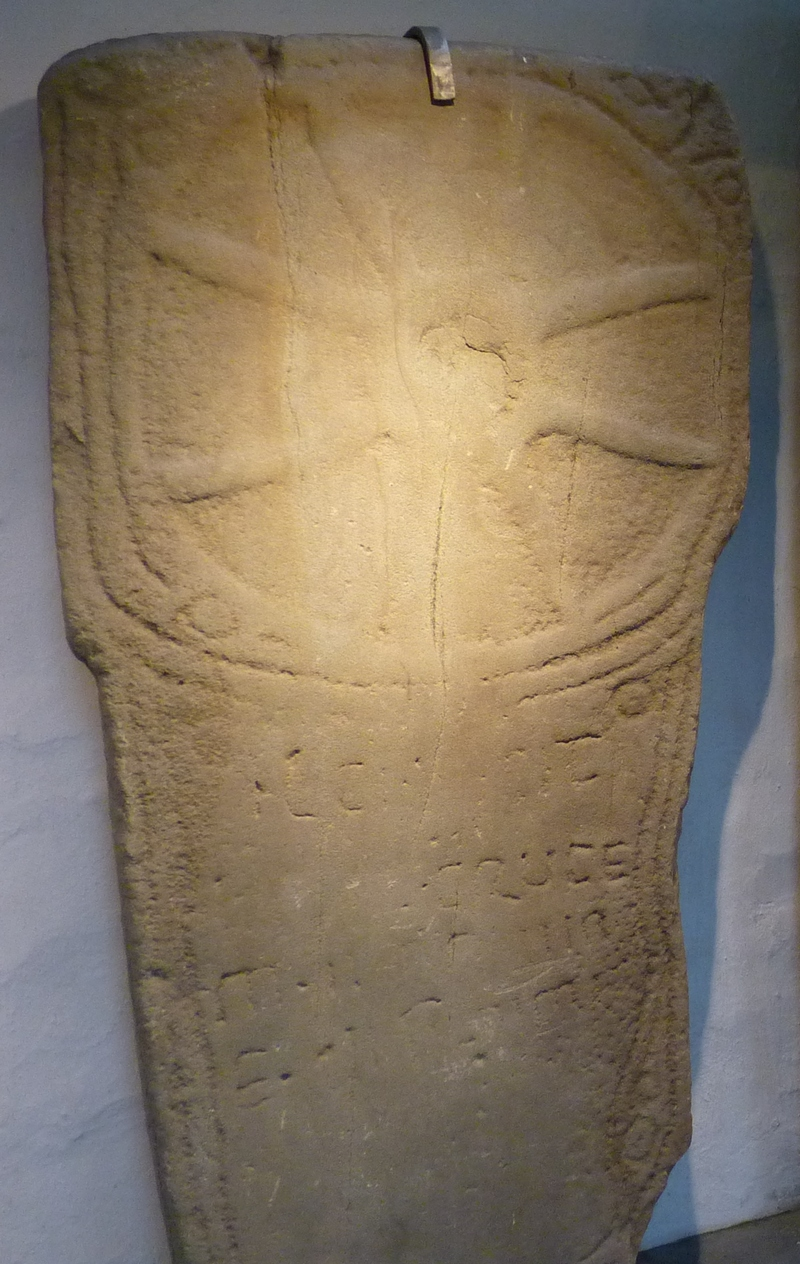
No 11. Cross of Ilci

=== No. 11. Cross of Ilci ===
Cart-wheel Cross, found along with No 12 being used as a footbridge, which has caused severe abraiding of both the carvings and the inscriptions. First noted in 1693, it is smaller but otherwise very similar to No 12, the cross of Ilquici, and shares its subsequent history. It stands 1.65 metres (5.4 ft) above ground, 0.79 metres (2.6 ft) wide and 0.25 metres (0.82 ft) thick, made from locally occurring Pennant sandstone.

Date
late 10th or 11th century
Inscription
Possible deciphering of worn inscription: ILCI [FE]CIT H[ANC] CRUCE M IN [NOM]IN E DEI SUMMI

'Ilci made this cross in the name of God most High'

Location
From Cwrt Dafydd Farm, south of Margam.

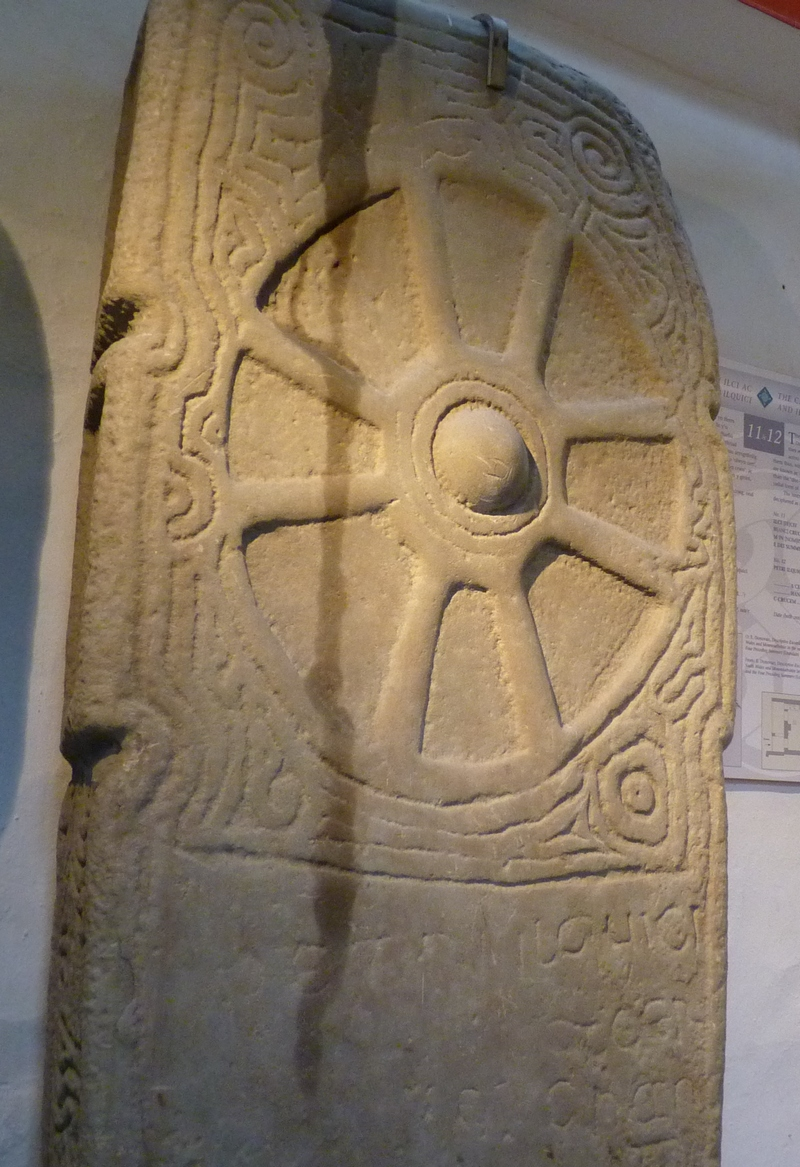
No 12. Cross of Ilquici

=== No. 12. Cross of Ilquici ===
Cart-wheel Cross, found along with No 11 being used as a footbridge. It was first noted in 1693, was moved to the Margam Abbey Chapter house ruins during the 19th century, and moved again into the museum building in 1932. It stands 1.93 metres (6.3 ft) above ground, 0.93 metres (3.1 ft) wide and 0.25 metres (0.82 ft) thick, made from locally occurring Pennant sandstone.

Date
late 10th or 11th century
Inscription
Possible deciphering of worn inscription: PETRI ILQUICI ... A CER ... HAN C CRUCEM ...T

'The cross of St Peter Ilquici erected this cross ? for the soul of ...'

Location
From Cwrt Dafydd Farm, south of Margam.

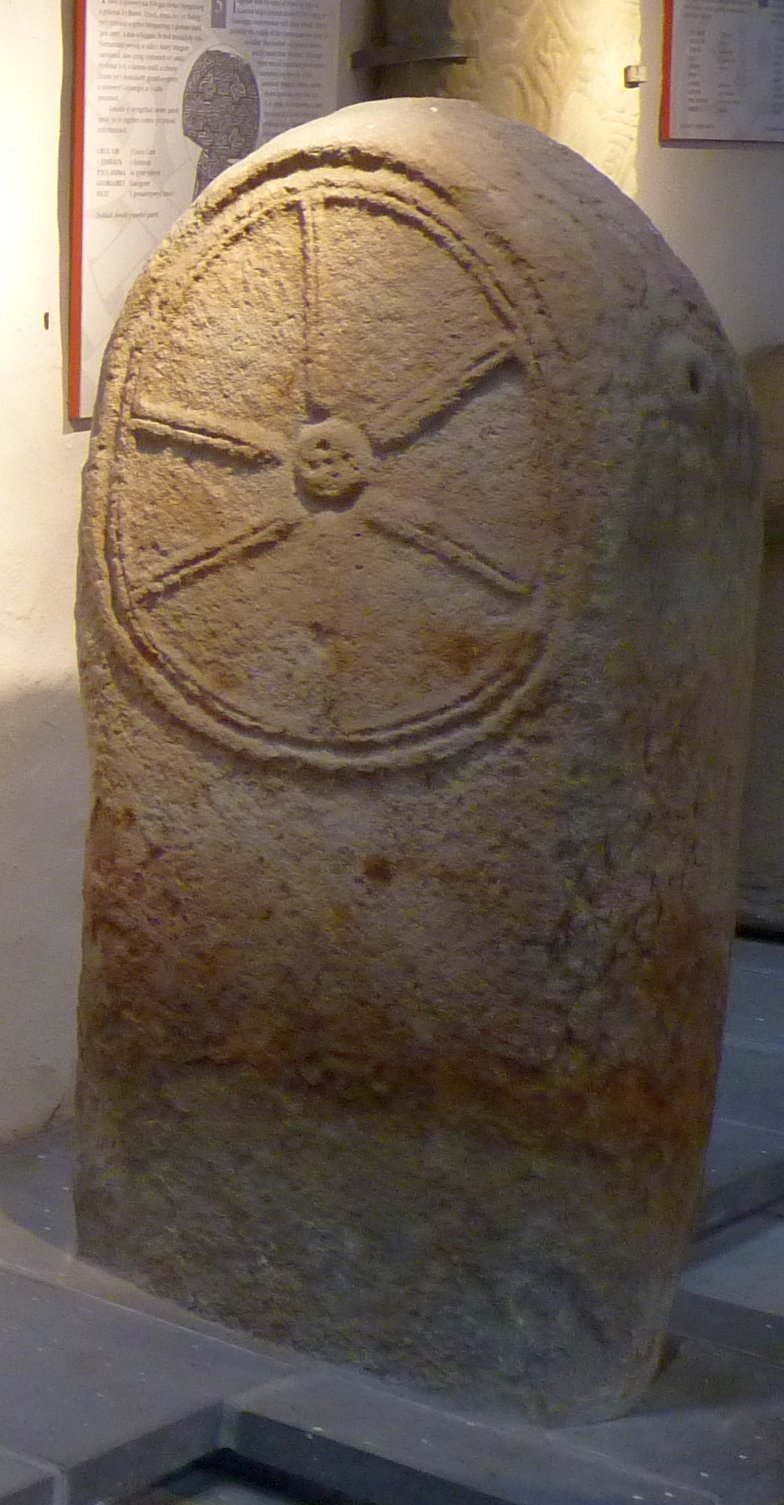
No 13. (front) Cart-wheel cross

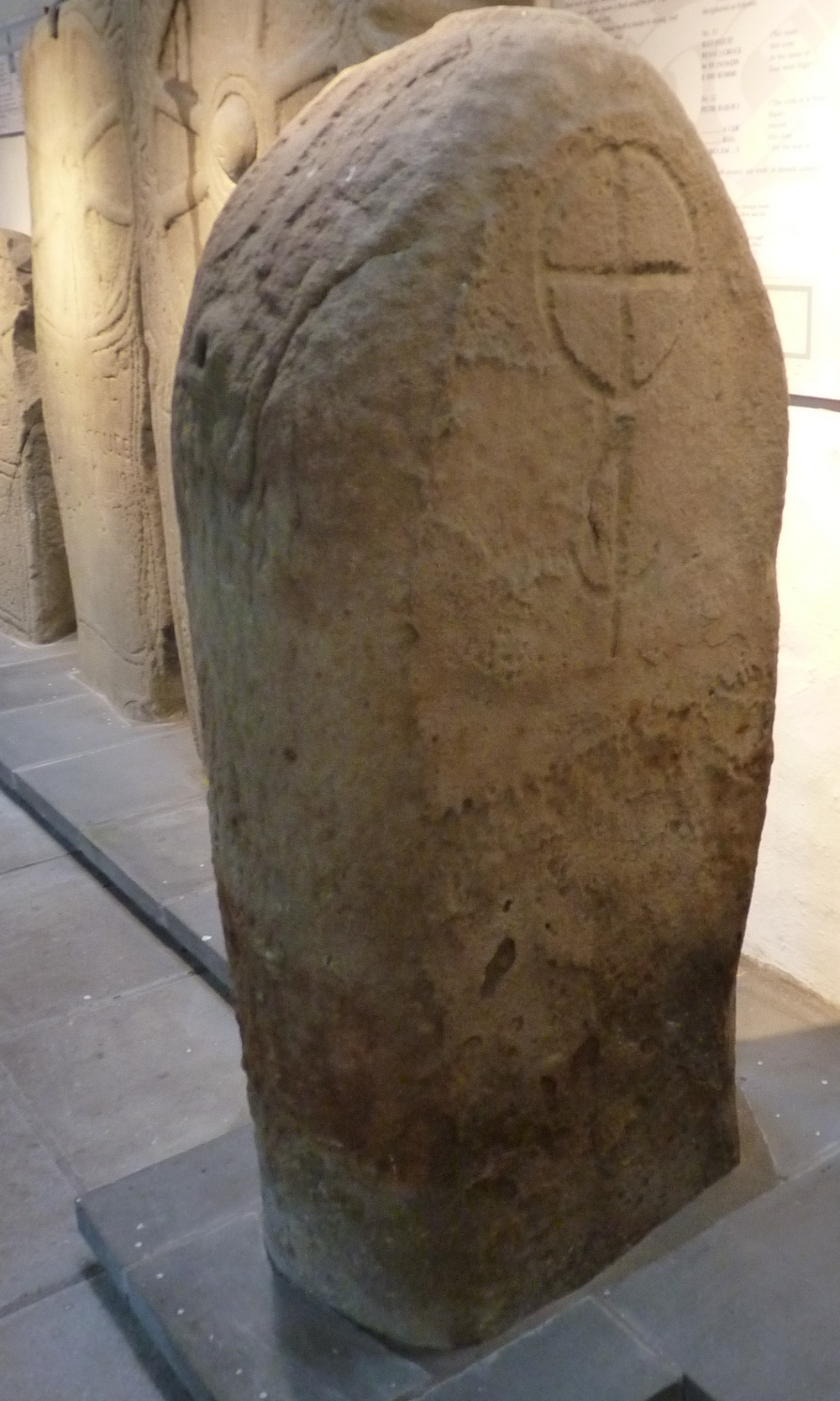
No 13. (reverse) linear ring-cross

=== No. 13. Cart-wheel Cross ===
A stone slab showing a six-spoked 'cart-wheel' on the front and a linear 'ring cross' on the reverse. Although most linear crosses are dated rather earlier than the sculptured crosses, these are most likely to have been made at the same time.

Date
late 10th or 11th century
Location
Originally stood near Port Talbot Railway Station.

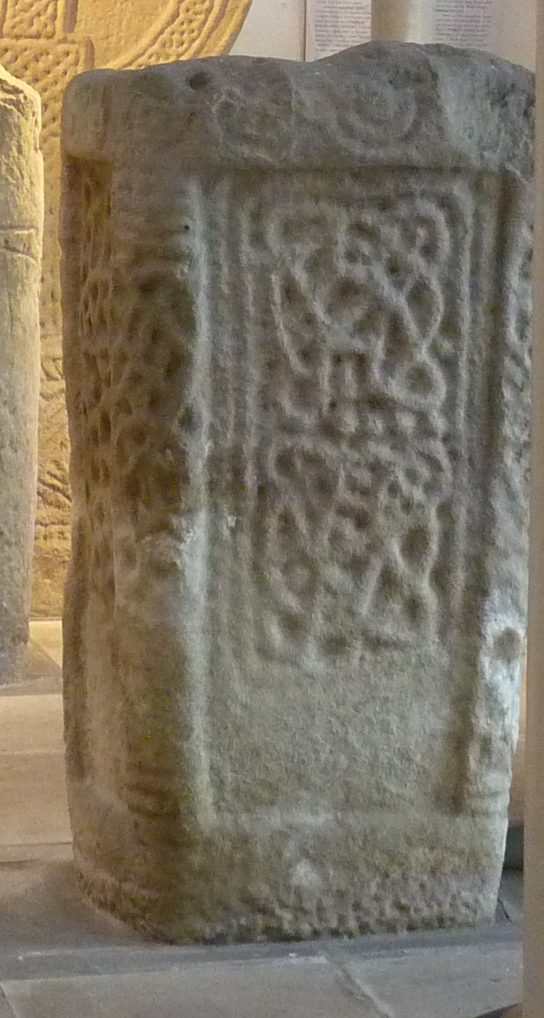
No 14. Carreg Fedyddiol

=== No. 14. Carreg Fedyddiol ===
This translates as 'The stone of Baptism' as it was wrongly thought to be a font. What was thought to be a central bowl is now identified as a pedestal with socket to hold a now absent cross. It has interlace pattern and moulded edging.

Date
11th century
Location
It stood until 1968 at Litchard north of Bridgend.

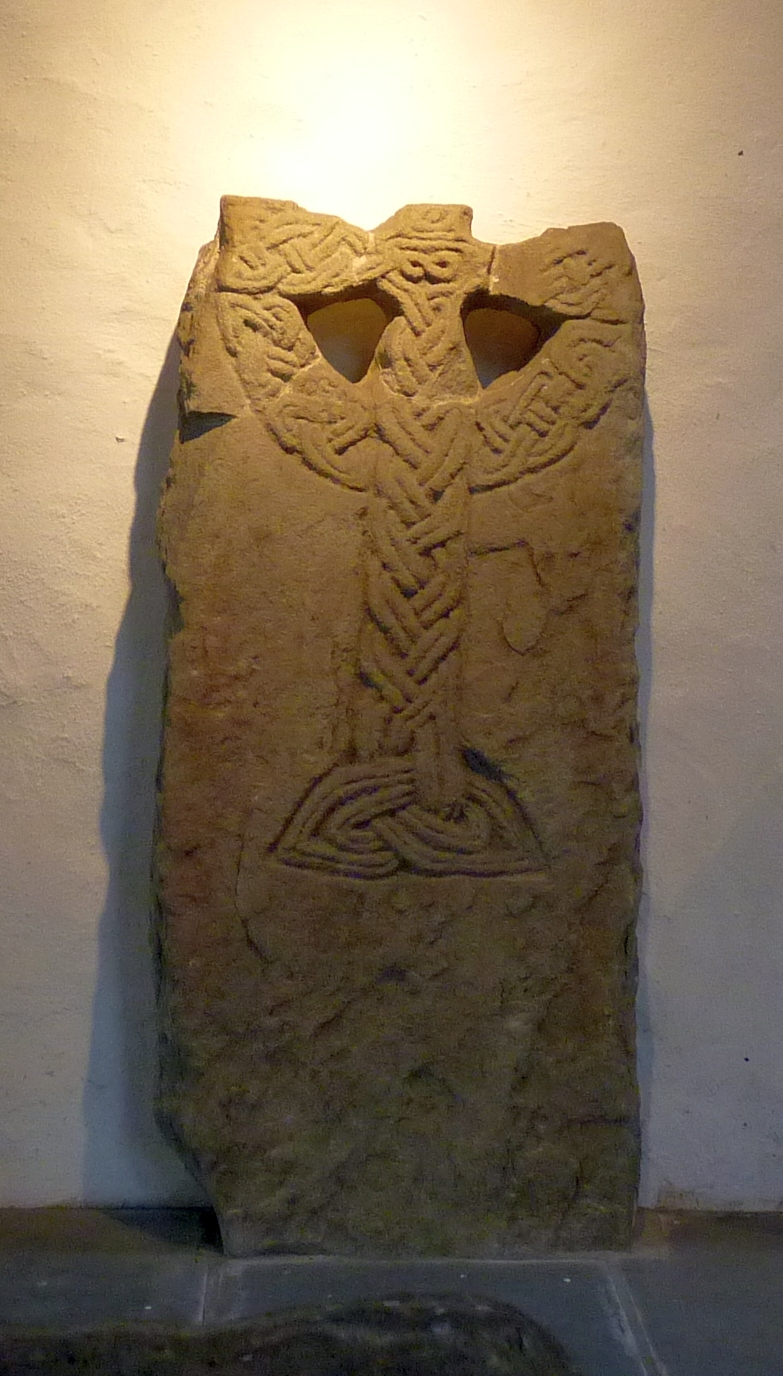
No 15. plaitwork cross

=== No. 15. Crux Christi plaitwork cross slab ===
Part of a slab, the top of the cross, is missing. The holes through the cross arms may not originally have gone all the way through.

Date
9th or 10th century
Location
Margam. (It is named after similar crosses that include a Crux Christi inscription.)

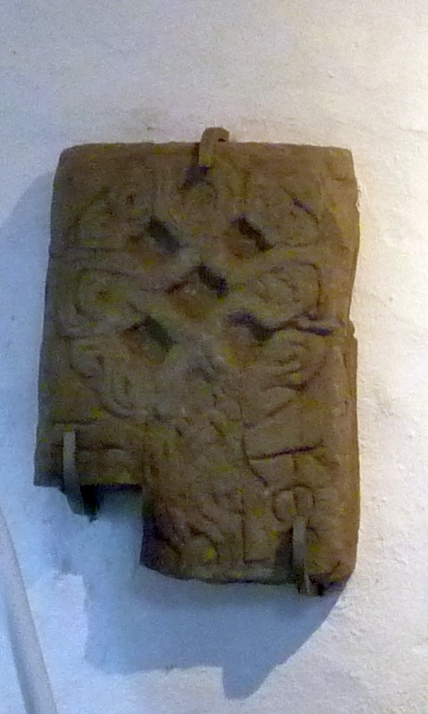
No 16. Crux Christi plaitwork cross

=== No. 16. Crux Christi plaitwork cross slab ===
Part of a slab, possibly made to lie flat over a grave.

Date
9th or 10th century
Inscription
Fragments of text may have included: ... FECIT CRUX CHRIST UT....||...made the Cross of Christ for Ut...
Location
From Cwrt Uchaf Farm, Port Talbot (Now under the steelworks)

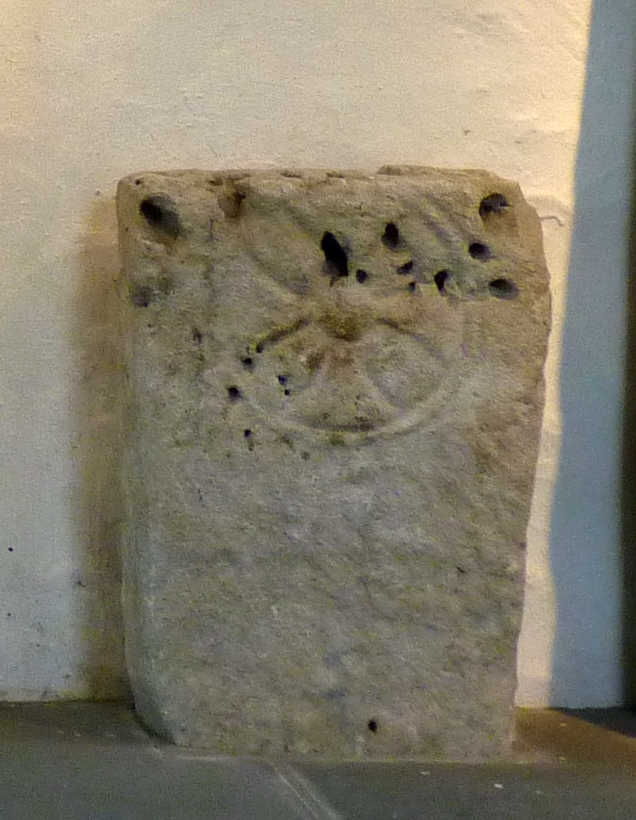
No 17. Grave marker

=== No. 17. Grave Marker ===
Small grave marker

Date
11th or early 12th century
Location
From Llangewydd Church near Bridgend, which was demolished in the early 13th century.

== Post-Norman stones ==
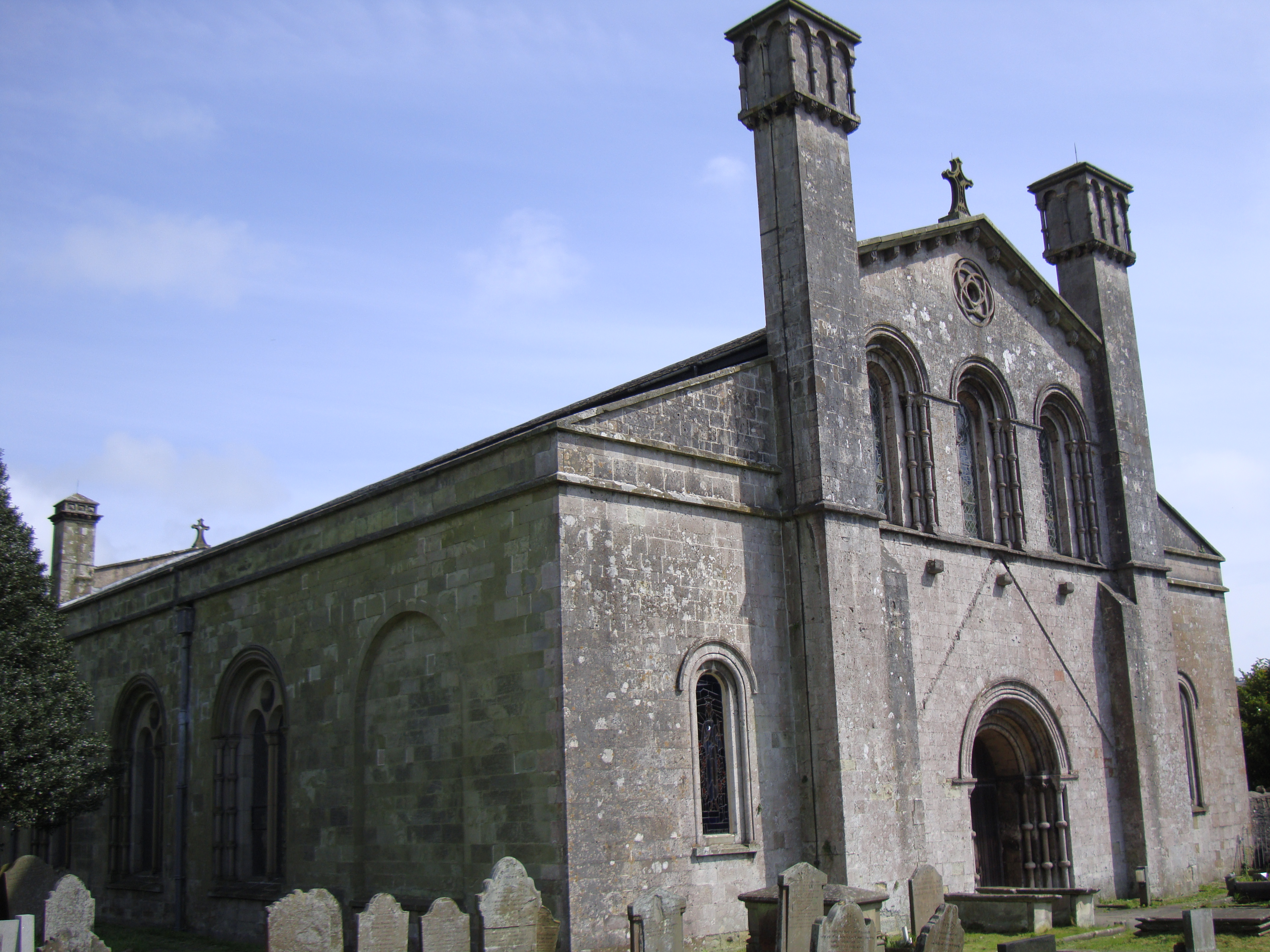
Margam Abbey: West front of the Church

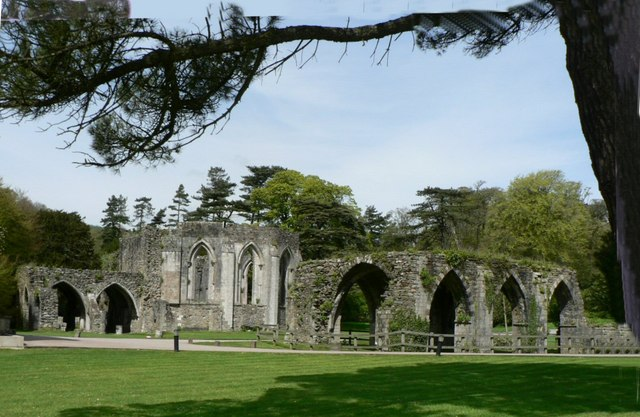
Margam Abbey Ruins, including the Chapter House

In 1147 the Margam monastery was re-founded as a Cistercian Abbey by Robert, 1st Earl of Gloucester and lord of Glamorgan. With French monks, an English lord and new Abbey buildings, there would have been little or no interest in the earlier monastery, and the early stones are the main evidence that survives. The Nave and west front of the Cistercian Abbey Church, on the other hand, survived both the reformation and a 19th-century renovation, and is now the Parish Church. The remainder of the Abbey buildings, including the Chapter house, with its memorials to the Cistercian Abbots, became part of the estate of the Mansel and then Talbot families, and are now part of Margam public park.

The Talbot family collected the early Christian Stones in and around the Chapter house, and under the care of the Commissioner of Public Works they were all re-housed in the current museum, including five grave-slabs and an effigy from the pre-reformation period, and four post-reformation memorial slabs. Following Cadws major reworking of the museum building in the 1990s these later stones are all housed in the upper gallery, creating a clear distinction between the early Christian stones and the Cistercian and later memorials.

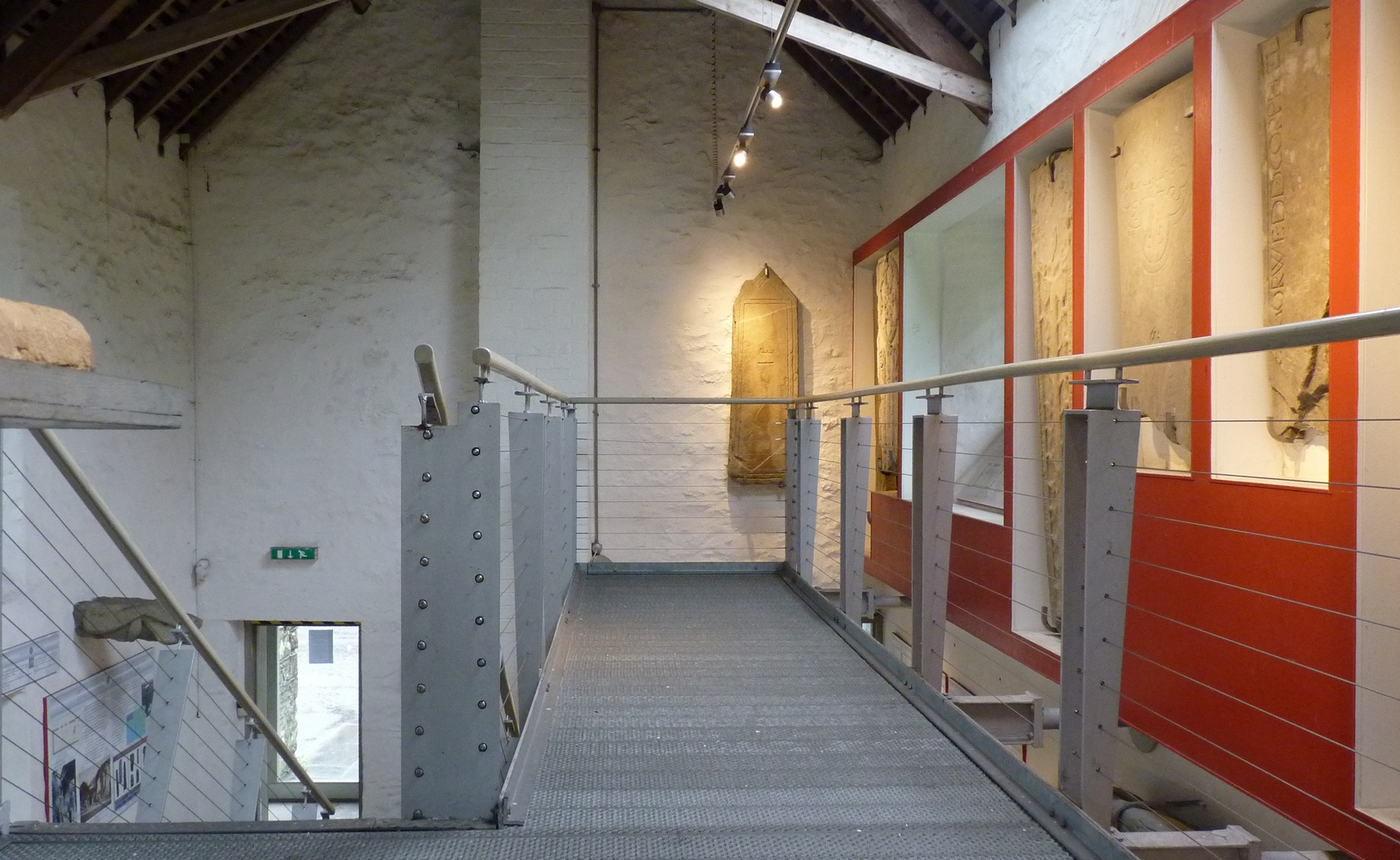
Margam Stones Museum upper gallery

Most of the grave slabs give simple initials, but three that have names are to Robert, Abbot of Rievaulx (No. 21, 1307); Henry, the 9th Abbot (No. 23, 14th century) and a partial inscription in Welsh '...EV GORWEDD GORPH ELI[ZABETH] .. HON V GLADDWYD ...' ( [here] lies the body of Elizabeth ... who was buried...', (No. 25, c. 1600).

== See also ==
- Margam Country Park
- Margam Abbey
- The Celtic crosses at St Illtyd's Church, Llantwit Major
- List of museums in Wales
- List of Cadw properties
- List of Scheduled Monuments in Neath Port Talbot
