= John Brocklebank =

Personal information
- Full name: John Montague Brocklebank
- Born: 3 September 1915; Meols, Cheshire, England
- Died: 13 September 1974 (aged 59); Palazz Zetjun, Malta
- Batting: Right-handed
- Bowling: Leg break Right-arm medium
- Relatives: Thomas Brocklebank (brother); Stanley Jackson (uncle)

Domestic team information
- Years: Team
- 1936: Cambridge University
- 1938–1948: Marylebone Cricket Club
- 1900: Lancashire
- 1947/48: Bengal

Career statistics
Competition	First-class
Matches	21
Runs scored	112
Batting average	9.33
100s/50s	–/–
Top score	23
Balls bowled	3,883
Wickets	68
Bowling average	29.38
5 wickets in innings	4
10 wickets in match	2
Best bowling	6/92
Catches/stumpings	7/–
- Source: ESPNcricinfo, 20 February 2019

Sir John Montague Brocklebank, 5th Baronet (3 September 1915 – 13 September 1974) was the 5th baronet of the Brocklebank baronets, the chairman of the shipping company Cunard, and a first-class cricketer for Cambridge University, Lancashire, Bengal and various amateur sides before and after the Second World War.

Brocklebank was born in Hoylake, Cheshire and died in Malta. He was educated at Eton College and gained the rank of Major in the Royal Artillery (Territorial Army). He fought in the Second World War, and was a POW from 1943 to 1945. He was a younger son of Sir Aubrey Brocklebank, 3rd Baronet and succeeded his unmarried brother Sir Thomas Aubrey Lawies Brocklebank, 4th Baronet, also a first-class cricketer for Cambridge University, to the baronetcy in 1953. He was in turn succeeded by his own son Sir Aubrey Thomas Brocklebank, the 6th and present Baronet.

He appeared in 21 first-class matches as a righthanded batsman who bowled right arm leg break or medium pace. He scored 112 runs with a highest score of 23 and held seven catches. He took 68 wickets with a best analysis of six for 92. Brocklebank was chosen in the England team to play three Tests in India in 1939–40, but the tour was cancelled due to the outbreak of World War II.

Baronetage of the United Kingdom
Preceded by Thomas Brocklebank	Baronet (of Greenlands and Springwood); 1953–1974	Succeeded by Aubrey Brocklebank
