= Thomas Brocklebank =

English cricketer, businessman, and baronet

Sir Thomas Aubrey Lawies Brocklebank, 4th Baronet (23 October 1899 – 15 September 1953) was the 4th baronet of the Brocklebank baronets, a businessman and a first-class cricketer for Cambridge University in two matches in 1919.

He was the eldest son of Sir Aubrey Brocklebank, 3rd Baronet and was educated at Eton and Trinity College, Cambridge. He was unmarried and was succeeded in the baronetcy by his brother John, also a first-class cricketer for Cambridge University.

== See also ==
- Brocklebank (surname)

Baronetage of the United Kingdom
Preceded by Aubrey Brocklebank	Baronet (of Greenlands and Springwood); 1929–1953	Succeeded by John Brocklebank
