= Brocklebank (automobile) =

British automobile

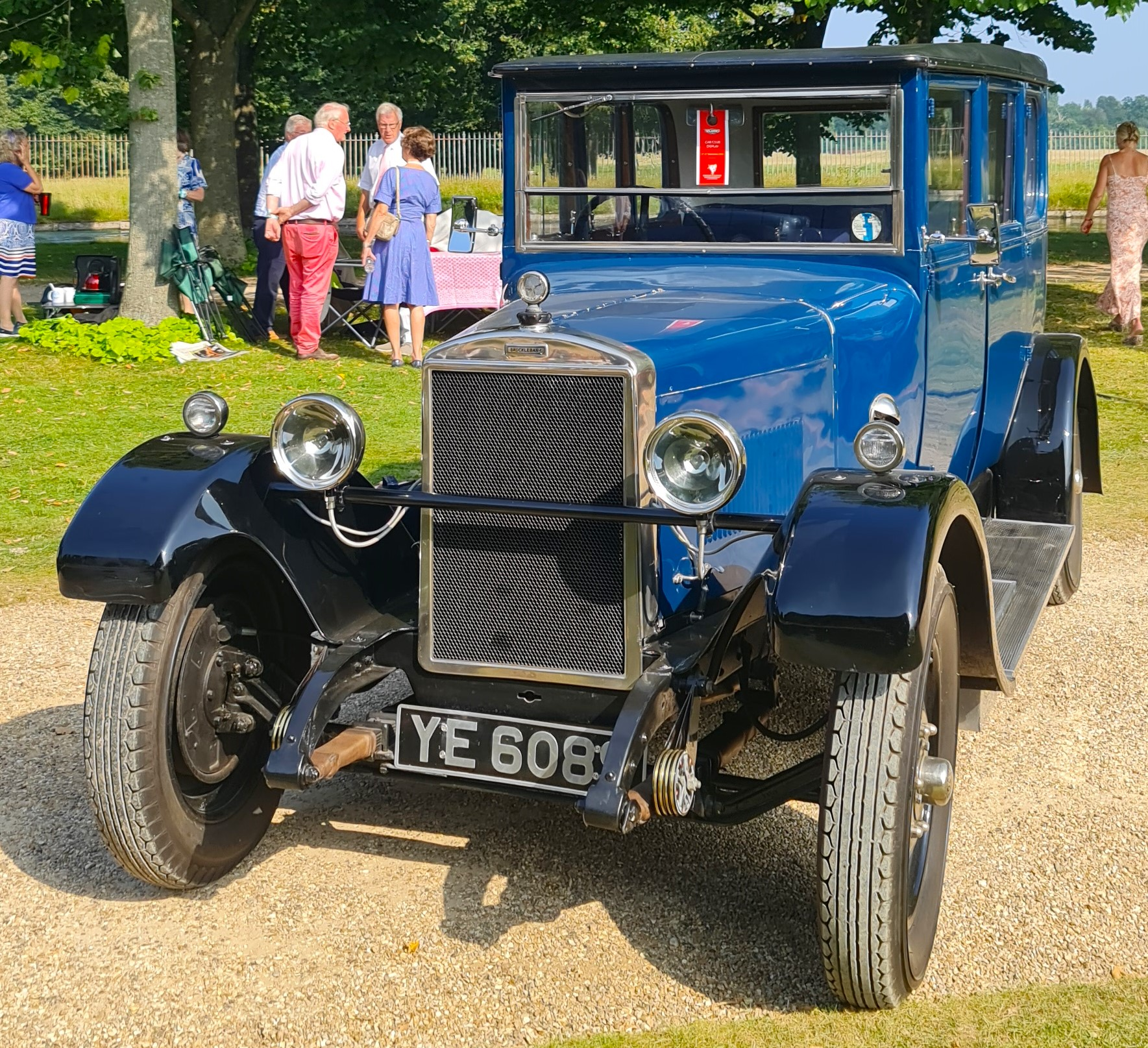
1927 Brocklebank 15 HP

The Brocklebank is a British car that was built by Brocklebank and Richards Ltd in Birmingham from 1925 to 1929. Assembly took place in the former Wolseley aero engine factory under the supervision of Charles Bull.

The only model produced was the 15 HP, with a 2051 cc six cylinder engine of their own design. The car was advertised as 'Birmingham's answer to the American challenge', and featured various American components, such as Warner gearboxes and axles and Lockheed brakes. Cars were shown at the London Motor Shows in 1927 and 1928 and body styles included 4 door saloons, Weymann fabric saloons, and open 2 and 4 seaters.

Production estimates varying from 350 to 600. The majority of Brocklebank production was exported to various countries of the British Empire.

The company failed in 1929.
