= Buchanan-Jardine baronets =

Baronetcy in the Baronetage of the United Kingdom

Escutcheon of the Jardine baronets of Castlemilk

The Jardine, later Buchanan-Jardine baronetcy, of Castle Milk in the County of Dumfries, is a title in the Baronetage of the United Kingdom. It was created on 20 July 1885 for the businessman and Liberal politician Robert Jardine. He was head of Jardine, Matheson and Co, merchants in China, and also represented Ashburton from 1865 to 1868, Dumfries from 1868 to 1874 and Dumfriesshire from 1880 to 1892, in Parliament. Jardine married Margaret, daughter of John Buchanan Hamilton and sister and heiress of John Hamilton-Buchanan, Chief of Clan Buchanan.

The 2nd and 3rd Baronets were also heads of Jardine, Matheson and Co. The latter assumed the additional surname of Buchanan.

== Jardine, later Buchanan-Jardine baronets, of Castlemilk (1885) ==
- Sir Robert Jardine, 1st Baronet (1825–1905)
- Sir Robert William Buchanan Jardine, 2nd Baronet (1868–1927)
- Sir John William Buchanan-Jardine, 3rd Baronet (1900–1969)
- Sir Andrew Rupert John Buchanan-Jardine, 4th Baronet (1923–2010)
- Sir John Christopher Rupert Buchanan-Jardine, 5th Baronet (born 1952)

The heir apparent is the present holder's only son, Jamie Rupert Buchanan-Jardine (born 1994).

== See also ==
- Buchanan baronets
- Jardine baronets
- William Jardine

== Notes ==
Baronetage of the United Kingdom
Preceded by Errington baronets	Jardine baronets of Castlemilk; 20 July 1885	Succeeded by Bell baronets
