= Daniel Brocklebank (shipbuilder) =

Daniel Brocklebank (c. 1741-1801) was a shipbuilder, first in North America and then in Whitehaven, and a mariner in between.

He was born in 1741 (or 1742) at Torpenhow, England. At age 14 he moved to Whitehaven to take up an apprenticeship as a carpenter for a shipbuilder. In 1770, Brocklebank established a shipyard at Sheepscutt (Sheepscot), which is near Portland, Maine. He brought with him his wife Anne, to whom he had been married only one year, and their baby daughter Sarah.

At Sheepscot he built five ships, one per year. When the American Revolution commenced, he took his family and his newest vessel, Castor, launched in early 1775 and not yet fully fitted out, and sailed home to Britain.

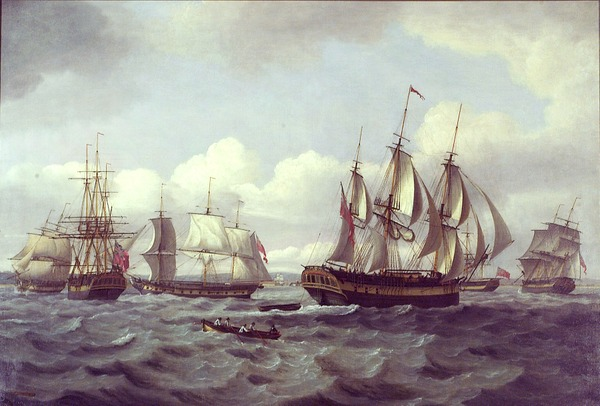
Castor and other vessels in a choppy sea; Thomas Luny, 1802, National Maritime Museum

In 1779 he received a letter of marque and became a privateer, using Castor, reportedly a brig of 220 tons (bm), that he armed with 20 guns. When Castor was lost near Jamaica in 1781, he had the firm of Spedding & Co. build a second Castor. This was probably the Castor launched in 1782 that traded as far as Bengal and served until 1808, though Brocklebank apparently sold her in 1791 or 1792. Spedding & Co. also built the ship Precedent and the brig Cyrus for Brocklebank. In addition, Brocklebank purchased several ships from Stockdale & Co.

Brocklebank was able to restart his shipbuilding firm in 1785 (or 1788). Here he built some 25 (or 27) vessels. By 1795 he had built up a fleet of eleven vessels of a total burthen of 1,750 tons (bm).

Brocklebank died in 1801. His two sons then took over the firm, which they renamed Thomas and John Brocklebank; later it became Thos. and Jno. Brocklebank.
