= Brocklebank Line =

Brocklebank Line House flag

The Brocklebank Line (formally named Thos. and Jno. Brocklebank) was an English shipping line that operated in the 19th and 20th centuries.

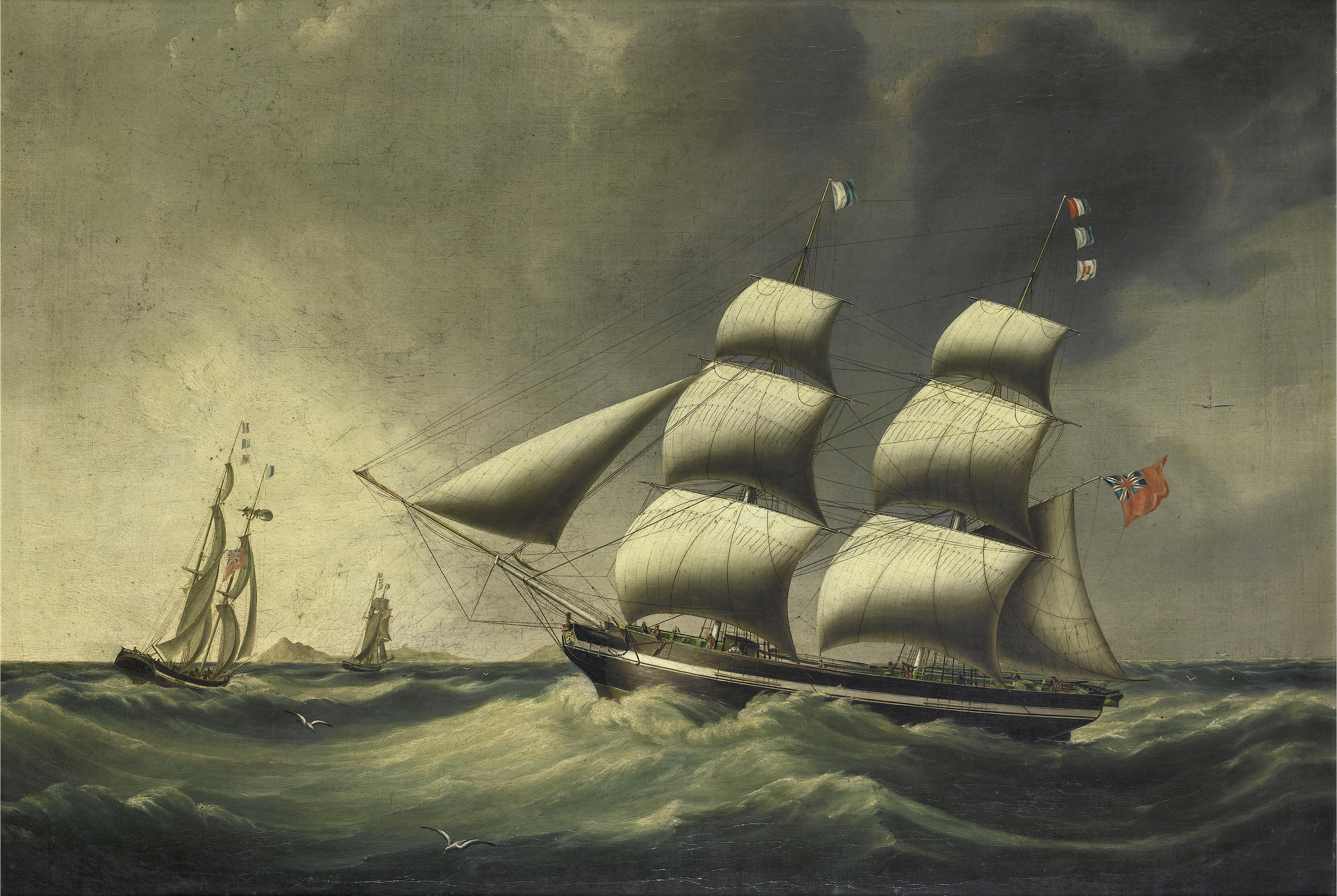
A painting of the Brocklebank–built and operated brig Rimac, which sailed in the mid-19th-century

Daniel Brocklebank founded a shipyard in Whitehaven in 1785, and expanded in the following years into operating ships. Following Brocklebank's death in 1801, his sons Thomas and John took over the business, which was incorporated as Thomas and John Brocklebank. The line expanded steadily in the first half of the 1800s, opening routes to South America by 1809, India in 1815 following the end of the East India Company's monopoly, and China in 1829. The line's operations were based out of Liverpool and run by Thomas Brocklebank, while John ran the Whitehaven shipyard until his death in 1831. The next generation of Brocklebanks, Thomas Jr. and Ralph, became partners in the business in 1843, and the following year the line reached its peak with a fleet of fifty ships.

In 1865 the shipyard at Whitehaven closed, with most of the line's subsequent ships built at Harland & Wolff. In 1911 the Brocklebank family gave up full control of the company, when Sir Percy, Frederic and Denis Bates—descendants of shipping magnate Sir Edward Bates—acquired a stake in the line.

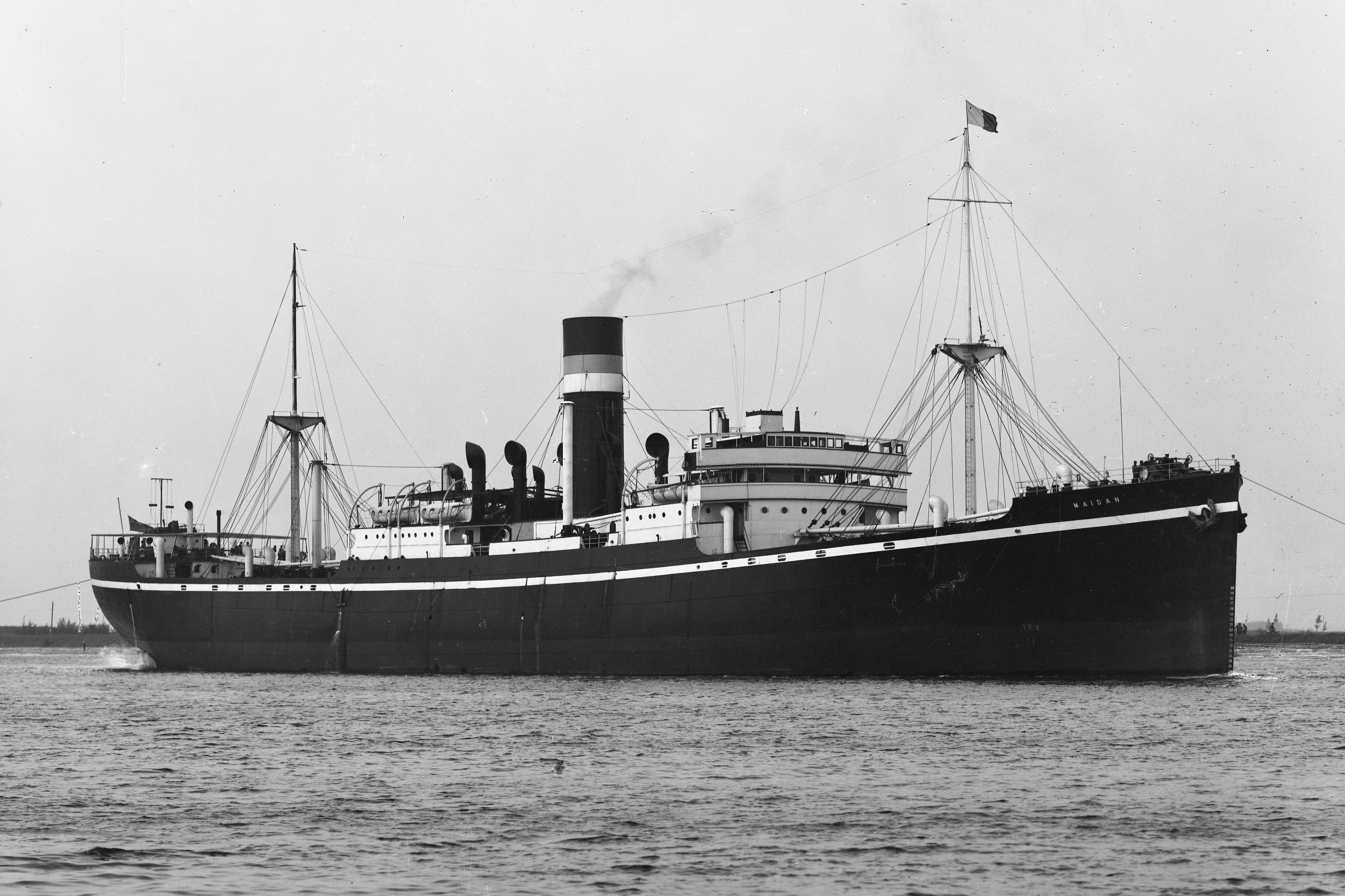
Maidan sailed for Brocklebank between 1925 and 1940

In 1912 the Anchor Line, a Cunard Line subsidiary, took a controlling interest in Brocklebank. In 1916 Brocklebank bought the Wells Line, and came under the control of Cunard in 1919 when the latter bought the entirety of the Brocklebank and Bates families' shares. After retraction during the 1930s, Cunard bought the remaining outstanding Brocklebank stock in 1940, and while the line lost the majority of its ships during World War II, it rebuilt following the war. In 1967 a Cunard restructuring led to a renamed Cunard Brocklebank Line taking over all of Cunard's cargo traffic. Cunard suffered financially in the following years, however, and the freight business was eventually shuttered, with the last Brocklebank–flagged ships sold in 1983.
