= Jardine =

Jardine is a surname. Notable people with the surname include:

- Al Jardine (born 1942), member of the Beach Boys
- Alexander Jardine (British Army officer) (died 1799), Scottish army officer and author
- Alexander Jardine (Medal of Honor) (1874–1949), American Medal of Honor recipient
- Alexander William Jardine (1843–1920), Australian engineer and geographer
- Antonio Jardine (born 1988), NCAA college basketball player for the Syracuse Orange
- Cassandra Jardine (1954–2012), British journalist and writer
- Christine Jardine (born 1960), British politician
- David Jardine (disambiguation), several people:

- David Jardine (1840–1892), of David and John Jardine, US architect
- David Jardine Jardine (1847–1922), Scottish landowner and racehorse owner
- David Jardine (barrister) (1794–1860), English barrister and magistrate
- David Jardine (footballer) (1867-?), Scottish football goalkeeper
- David Jardine (merchant) (1818–1856), tai-pan of the Jardine, Matheson & Co.

- Don Jardine (1940–2006), American professional wrestler
- Douglas Jardine (1900–1958), English cricketer
- Sir Ernest Jardine, 1st Baronet (1859–1947), Scottish MP
- Frank Jardine (ice hockey) (1924–1999), British ice hockey player
- Francis Lascelles Jardine (1841–1919), Australian pioneer
- George Jardine, Scottish religious minister and academic
- George Jardine (rugby league), Australian rugby league footballer
- Henry V. Jardine, former U.S. Ambassador to Mauritius and Seychelles
- James Jardine (disambiguation), several people:

- James Jardine (engineer) (1776–1858), Scottish civil engineer, mathematician and geologist
- James Jardine (cricketer, born 1794) (1794–1872), English cricketer
- James Jardine (judge) (1846–1909), English cricketer, academic, barrister and judge
- James Jardine (Medal of Honor) (1837–1922), Union Army soldier and Medal of Honor recipient
- James Bruce Jardine (1870–1955), British soldier and diplomat
- James Willoughby Jardine (1879–1945), British judge and politician

- Jeanne Jardine, British domestic and culinary writer
- John E. Jardine (1838–1920) of David and John Jardine, US architect
- John Jardine (football coach) (died 1990), American football coach
- Sir John Jardine, 1st Baronet (1844–1919), Scottish Liberal politician and businessman
- Keith Jardine (born 1975), American mixed martial artist
- Lisa Jardine (1944–2015), British historian
- Nicholas Jardine (born 1943), British mathematician, philosopher of science and its history, and historian
- Ray Jardine, American author and adventurer
- Robert Jardine (disambiguation), several people:

- Robert Jardine (politician) (1825–1905), Scottish businessman, politician and baronet
- Robert Jardine (railway promoter) (1812–1866), Canadian businessman
- Bob Jardine (1864–1941), Scottish footballer
- Robert Jardine (surgeon) (1862–1932), Canadian professor of midwifery in Glasgow, Scotland
- Robert Anderson Jardine (1878–1950), priest of the Church of England

- Rick Jardine, Canadian mathematician
- Quintin Jardine Scottish author
- Sandy Jardine (1948–2014), Scottish footballer
- Taylor Jardine (1990–), lead singer for the pop-punk band We Are the In Crowd
- James W. Jardine (1908–1977), City of Chicago Water Commissioner; Jardine Water Purification Plant named for him
- Sir William Jardine, 7th Baronet (1800–1874), Scottish naturalist
- Walter Jardine (1884–1970), Australian commercial artist
- William Jardine (disambiguation), several people:

- William Jardine (1784–1843), Scottish surgeon and businessman
- William Jardine (merchant), Scottish surgeon and merchant, of Jardine, Matheson & Co.
- Sir William Jardine, 7th Baronet (1800–1874), Scottish naturalist
- William Marion Jardine (1879–1959), U.S. Secretary of Agriculture, Ambassador to Egypt
- William Murray Jardine (born 1984), 24th Chief of Clan Jardine
- William Jardine, editor of the Farmers' Almanac

== See also ==
- Clan Jardine, a lowland Scottish clan
- Jardine baronets
  - Buchanan-Jardine baronets
- Jerdan
