= John Jardine =

John Jardine may refer to:

- John Jardine (American football) (1936–1990), American football coach
- John Jardine (British Columbia politician) (1857–1937), politician in British Columbia, Canada
- Sir John Jardine, 1st Baronet (1844–1919), Scottish businessman and Liberal politician
- Sir John Jardine, 3rd Baronet (1683–1737)
- John Jardine (Prince Edward Island politician), Prince Edward Island, Canada politician
- John Jardine, police magistrate at Rockhampton, Government Resident in the Torres Strait Islands from 1862.
- Rick Jardine (John Frederick Jardine), Canadian mathematician
- John Jardine (minister) (1716-1766) Dean of the Chapel Royal in Scotland

== See also ==
- Jardine baronets for others
