= James Jardine =

James Jardine may refer to:

- James Jardine (engineer) (1776–1858), Scottish civil engineer, mathematician and geologist
- James Jardine (cricketer, born 1794) (1794–1872), English cricketer
- James Jardine (judge) (1846–1909), English cricketer, academic, barrister and judge
- James Jardine (Medal of Honor) (1837–1922), Union Army soldier and Medal of Honor recipient
- James Bruce Jardine (1870–1955), British soldier and diplomat
- James Willoughby Jardine (1879–1945), British judge and politician
