= Jerdan =

Jerdan is a Scottish surname. It is a variant of Jardine. Notable people with this surname include:

- William Jerdan (1782–1869), Scottish businessman
- David Smiles Jerdan (1871–1951), Scottish businessman and horticulturist
- William Jerdan Jr. (1915–2001), American Reformed Episcopal bishop

== See also ==
- Jardine
