= Colonial Life Arena =

Multi-purpose arena in South Carolina

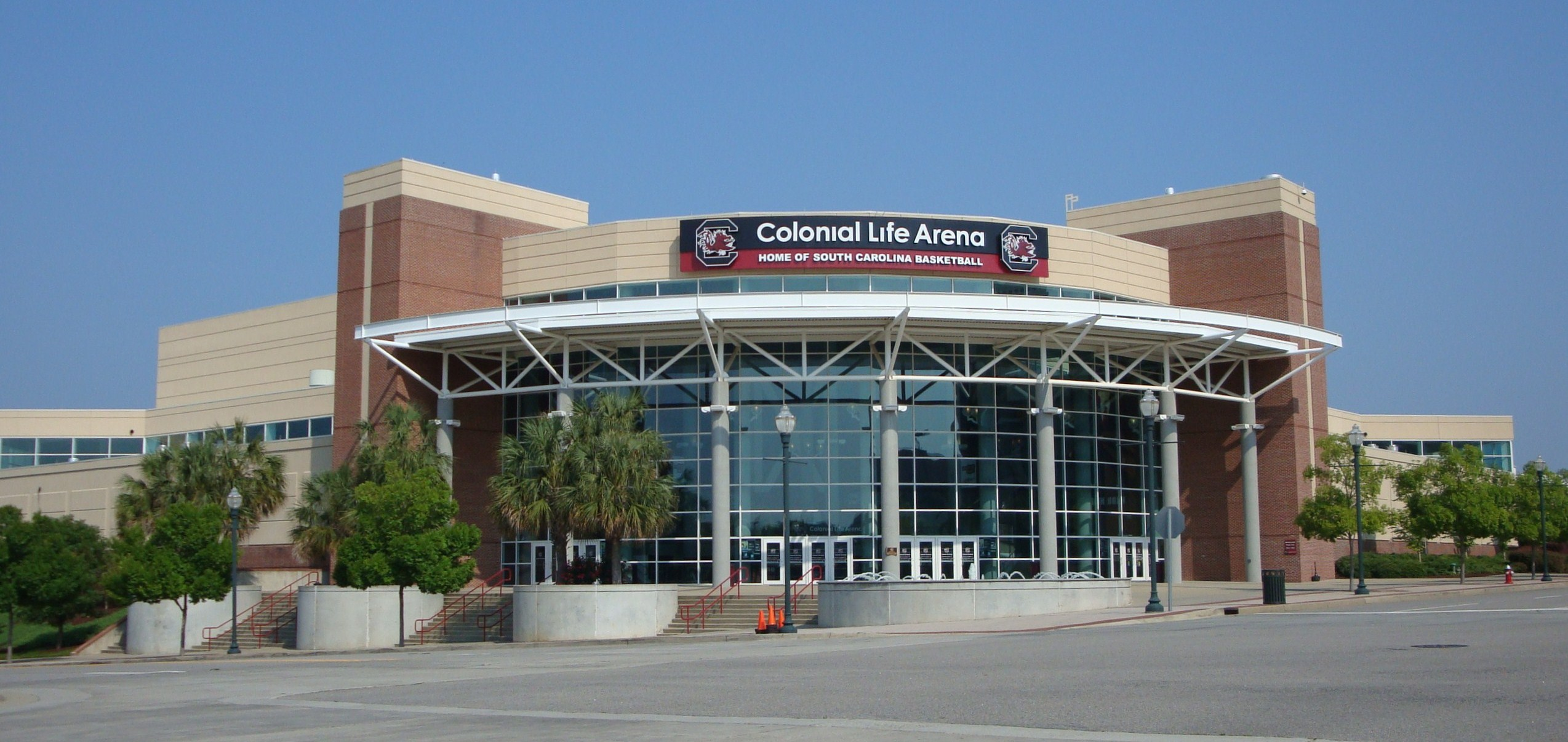
- The arena in 2011
- Interactive map of Colonial Life Arena
- Former names: Carolina Center (2002–2003); Colonial Center (2003–2008)
- Address: 801 Lincoln Street
- Location: Columbia, South Carolina, U.S.
- Coordinates: 33°59′42″N 81°02′14″W
- Owner: University of South Carolina
- Operator: OVG360
- Capacity: 18,000 (Basketball); 19,000 (Concerts)
- Surface: Multi-surface
- Public transit: The Comet: Routes 28, 52X, 63, 101, 201, 301, 401, 601; Amtrak Silver Star at Columbia

Construction
- Groundbreaking: April 25, 2001
- Opened: November 21, 2002
- Cost: $65 million ($116 million in 2025 dollars)
- Architects: Rosser International Inc. JHS Architects
- Structural engineer: Geiger Engineers
- General contractor: Beers Construction

Tenants
- South Carolina Gamecocks (NCAA) (2002–present); Columbia Stingers (NIFL) (2007)

Website
- coloniallifearena.com

The Colonial Life Arena is a multi-purpose arena in Columbia, South Carolina, primarily home to the University of South Carolina men's and women's basketball teams. Opened as a replacement for the Carolina Coliseum with the name Carolina Center in 2002, the 18,000-seat arena is also host to various events, including conferences, concerts, and graduation ceremonies. It is the largest arena in the state of South Carolina and the eighth largest campus college arena.

The naming rights were acquired in 2003 by Unum, a Portland, Maine–based insurance company, and it was renamed to the Colonial Center after the Colonial Life & Accident Insurance Company, a Unum subsidiary headquartered in Columbia. On July 22, 2008, the USC board approved renaming the building to the Colonial Life Arena as part of the rebranding by Unum (which by then had moved to Chattanooga, Tennessee) of Colonial Life & Accident as Colonial Life.

== History and use ==
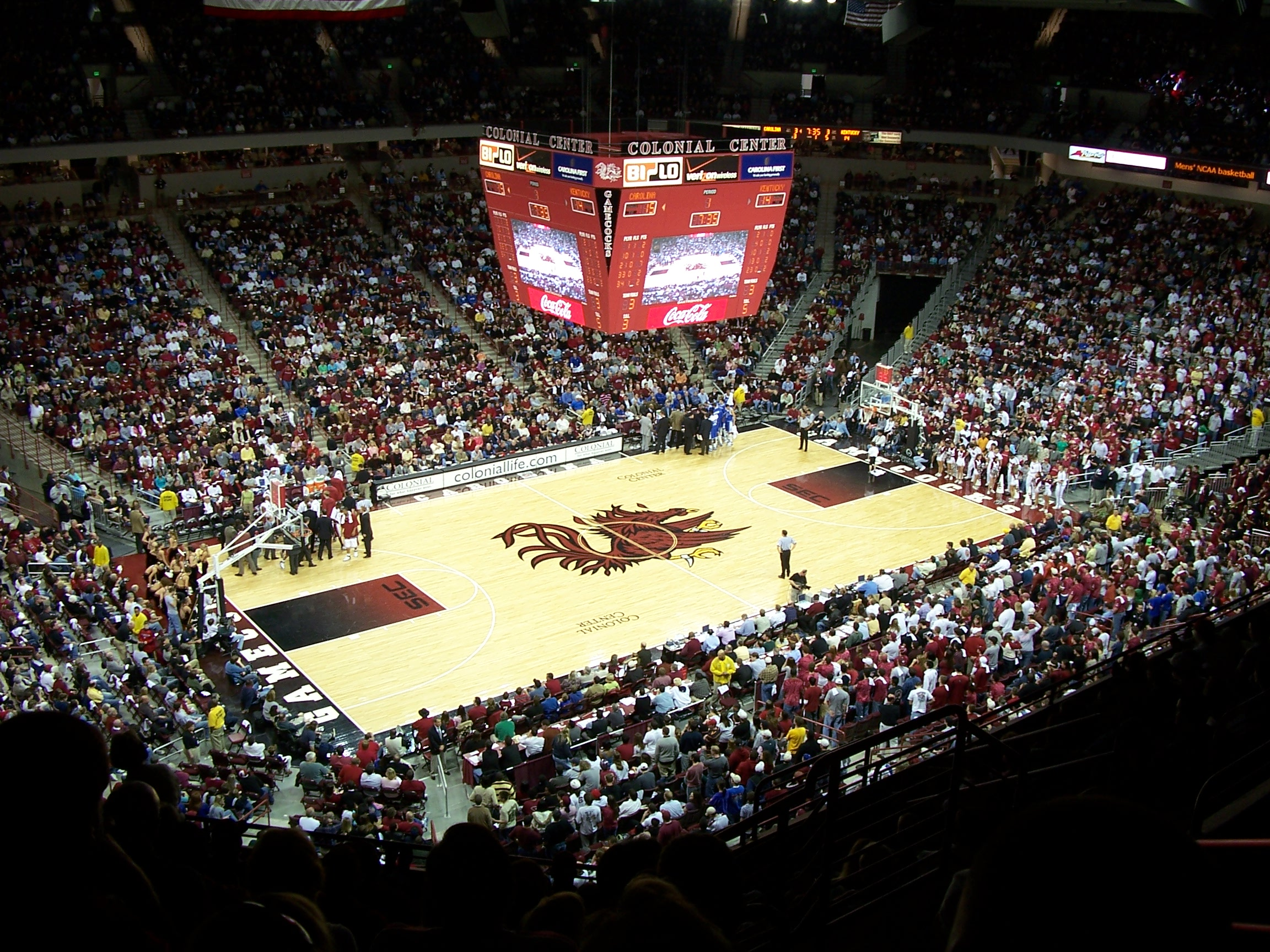
The arena floor of the Colonial Life Arena.

The arena first opened on November 22, 2002, with the season opener of the South Carolina women's basketball team. A near sell-out crowd of 17,712 fans saw the 72–58 Gamecocks victory over in-state rival Clemson, with a $1 admission charge, at that time commonly used by the women's basketball team to promote major games. The official grand opening took place December 2, 2002. The men's basketball team defeated Temple 66–47. On January 26, 2010 South Carolina defeated #1 ranked and undefeated Kentucky 68–62 in the arena, one of the biggest wins in South Carolina history.

On January 18, 2021, as part of the university's observance of Martin Luther King Day, the university dedicated a statue of Gamecocks great and 2020 WNBA MVP A'ja Wilson near the arena's main entrance.

Aside from Gamecock basketball, the Colonial Life Arena also hosts the South Carolina High School Basketball Championships each year. The facility is built to also host ice hockey games, and was intended to be the new home of the ECHL's Columbia Inferno. However, due to legal issues with the funding for the facility, the Inferno never played there. The franchise suspended operations in 2008, but after plans for a new arena in neighboring Lexington County fell through, the franchise was finally canceled in 2014. However, annual games pitting the Carolina Hurricanes alumni against Tampa Bay Lightning alumni have been played here.

The Colonial Life Arena was ranked 22nd in the world in ticket sales in 2003. It was also ranked the #1 arena in the Carolinas and was the #2 rated university arena in the world in 2005, based on ticket sales for touring shows.

It was managed by Spectra (formerly Global Spectrum), the facilities management subsidiary of Comcast Spectacor. The NBA's Philadelphia 76ers, then owned by Comcast Spectacor, played an exhibition game in the venue in October 2005. In 2021, Spectra was acquired by the Oak View Group and renamed OVG360. OVG360 remains the arena's manager to this day.

In 2007, it was home to the Columbia Stingers of the National Indoor Football League. The arena has hosted the Charlotte Bobcats and New York Knicks in the past.

Originally, the venue, like all Comcast-Spectator managed facilities, had its own ticketing policy, and therefore concerts were not controlled by the major ticketing industry firms.

Ticketing was provided by New Era Tickets, and tickets could be purchased through the Arena's website.

Ticketing for events at the arena is now provided through Ticketmaster.

== See also ==
- List of NCAA Division I basketball arenas
- List of indoor arenas in the United States
