= Robert Jardine =

Robert Jardine may refer to:

- Robert Jardine (politician) (1825–1905), Scottish businessman, politician and baronet
- Robert Jardine (railway promoter) (1812–1866), Canadian businessman
- Bob Jardine (1864–1941), Scottish footballer
- Robert Jardine (surgeon) (1862–1932), Nova Scotian and professor of midwifery in Glasgow, Scotland
- Robert Anderson Jardine (1878–1950), priest of the Church of England
