= Alexander Jardine (British Army officer) =

Scottish artillery officer, spy, and writer

- Died: April 8, 1799; Portugal
- Spouse: Juana
- Children: 5+
- Relatives: Alexander Jardine, 4th Baronet (father)
- Military career
- Allegiance: United Kingdom
- Branch: Army
- Service years: 1755–1780
- Rank: Brevet Lieutenant-Colonel
- Conflicts: Seven Years' War

Alexander Jardine (died 8 April 1799) was a Scottish artillery officer, spy, and writer on travel and politics.

== Life ==
He was an illegitimate son of Sir Alexander Jardine, 4th Baronet. He entered the Royal Artillery as a private matross in March 1755, by Forbes Macbean. He was transferred to the Royal Military Academy, Woolwich, as a cadet in June 1757. He passed out of the academy as a lieutenant-fireworker on 8 February 1758.

Jardine saw service in several theatres of the Seven Years' War, including the Raid on Rochefort, the Invasion of Martinique (1759) and the Invasion of Guadeloupe (1759), and in 1762 was in Gibraltar for its defence. His subsequent career was as second lieutenant on 11 September 1762, first lieutenant on 28 May 1766, and captain-lieutenant on 28 April 1773.

For four years from 1776, Jardine acted as a British intelligence agent in Spain. He was transferred to one of the Royal Artillery's invalid companies, on 1 November 1776. He became captain in 1777, brevet-major in 1783, and brevet lieutenant-colonel in 1793. On his return to England around 1780 he endured financial hardship, and appealed to highly placed friends. In 1787 he was in Jersey, a guest of Henry Seymour Conway, the Governor.

Jardine was sent in 1791 to Spain as consul in Galicia. He died in Portugal, on 8 April 1799.

=== Military Society of Woolwich ===
In 1772 Jardine returned from Gibraltar to Woolwich where he wrote to fellow officer Captain Edward Williams, proposing the formation of a Military Society at Woolwich, noting that "We have already in this country all kinds of Societies except a military one". This voluntary organisation, though the exchange of essays and ideas between the members, would give "an acquaintance to a fixed degree, with Geometry, Algebra, Mechanics, Fortification, Natural Philosophy, History, Law and Politics..."; he proposed that members become familiar with the ideas of a broad cross-section of authors and thinkers:

Ancients	Of the Moderns		
	Mathematical & Philosophy	Military	History, Politics, &c
Euclid	Emerson	Puisegar	Robinson
Herodotus	M'Laurin [sic]	Folard	Hume
Thucydides	Newton	Saxe	Macauley
Xenophon	Robins	Monticueuli [sic]	Blackstone
Arian	Gravesand	Turenne	Locke
Vegetius	Desaguliers	Fouguier	Bolingbroke
Polybius	Coates [sic]	Lloyd	De Thou
Caesar	Ferguson	Coehorn	Davila
Livy	Nolet	Vauban	Sully
Sullust	Simpson	Trincano	P. Daniel
	Belidor	Muller	Du Retz [sic]
	Mauduit	Du Pain	Montesquieu
		Du Lacq	Helvetius
			A. Ferguson
			Grotius

His proposal was accepted, and supported by others. It came into existence that year, with a set of rules established, and a library to be formed. Although the Society only lasted until 1775, its success inspired, in 1839, the formation of an Institution that later became the Royal Military College of Science.

== Works ==
Jardine wrote:

- Letters from Barbary, France, Spain, Portugal &c. (2 vols., 1788). At Gibraltar in 1771, Jardine was sent by the governor, General Edward Cornwallis, on a mission to Mohammed ben Abdallah, the Sultan of Morocco. This is Jardine's account of Morocco, with other letters written during visits to France and Spain, from Portugal in 1779, and from Jersey in 1787. He mentions as friends Sarah Proby (c.1741–1785, née Pownall) who was the wife of Charles Proby R.N., commissioner of Chatham Dockyard, and a Mrs. Pilcher; one of the two was his correspondent Mrs. P. Letters from Morocco were to an army officer, who has been tentatively identified as Robert Boyd. Some of the letters from the late 1770s were to a friend identified as Alexander Mackenzie.
- An Essay on Civil Government, or, Society Restored (1793), with Antonio Borghesi (or Borghese).

Both works reflect the views of Jardine as a reformer, and friend of William Godwin, particularly on the equality of the sexes. Jardine relied on stadial theory in arguing for the equality of women. His Letters was cited by Mary Hays, in her Appeal to the men of Great Britain in behalf of women (1798).

The second work was with the publisher James Ridgway in 1792, but was not actually published. Antonio Borghese was a French composer. Dybikowski concludes, of Jardine's contribution to the Essay, that it was "an amalgam of Godwinian personal and social ideals structured by a Williams-like political organization".

== Views ==
Jardine supported military reforms, such as Conway had carried out in Jersey. His opinions were tinged with republicanism and accepting agonistic behaviour. In 1782 he reviewed in The Monthly Review military works by Michael Dorset and Henry Lloyd, and James Douglas's anonymous translation A General Essay on Military Tactics from Jacques Antoine Hippolyte, Comte de Guibert. He made criticisms of British military education.

Politically, he identified as a Foxite critic of Lord North, an admirer of the theories on liberty of David Williams (philosopher), and his Letters were praised by Ralph Griffiths. He was personally acquainted with the reformer Francisco de Miranda. By the 1790s he was a regular of William Godwin's circle, to which he introduced James Glenie, and was familiar with some of the radical authors of the period, including William Ogilvie of Pittensear. He met Gaspar Melchor de Jovellanos in 1793, and they corresponded, but without finding much common ground.

On gender issues, Jardine's Letters broached matters such as the positive effects of female influence, and female education. Mary Wollstonecraft in the Analytical Review found some value in the work.

== Legacy ==
While stationed at Gibraltar Jardine collected military observations, and presented them in 1772 to the Regimental Society, Woolwich, which he helped to establish in 1772–5. The papers went to the Royal Artillery Institute.

== Family ==
Jardine married a Spanish woman, Juana. They had a family of at least five children. Their daughter Charlotte married Robert Dallas. Their daughters, Charlotte (1768–1792) and Joanna (c.1769–1830), are mentioned in The Early Journals and Letters of Fanny Burney, vol. v 1782 to 1783.

== Sources ==
- Hampson, Norman; Crook, Malcolm; Doyle, William; Forrest, Alan I. (2004). Enlightenment and Revolution: Essays in Honour of Norman Hampson. Ashgate. p. 94. ISBN 978-0754606826.
