= Columbia Stingers =

American indoor football team

Logo

General information
- Founded: 2006
- Folded: 2007
- Headquartered: Columbia, South Carolina at the Colonial Center
- Colors: Red, black, yellow

Personnel
- Owner: Global Spectrum
- General manager: Bobby Jackson
- Head coach: Corey Miller

Team history
- Columbia Stingers (2007)

Home fields
- Colonial Center (2007)

League / conference affiliations
- National Indoor Football League (2007)

The Columbia Stingers were a team in the National Indoor Football League (NIFL) which played for one season, in 2007. The team played their home games at the Colonial Center, home to South Carolina Gamecocks basketball.

The coach for the Columbia Stingers in 2007 was Corey Miller, who played football for both the University of South Carolina and the New York Giants.

Their offensive coordinator 2007 was Stephan Darby; assistant coach was Stacey Anderson; specialty coach was John Gill; secondary/strength coach was Danny Samuel; quarterbacks coach was Kent Merideth; and speed coach was Anthony Washington.

The team is now defunct. It remains to be seen as to whether there will be any other attempts to bring an arena football team to Columbia.

== Season-by-season ==
Season records
Season	W	L	T	Finish	Playoff results
2007	1	7	0	4th Atlantic	--
