= Applegarthtown =

Coordinates: 55.14°N 03.41°W

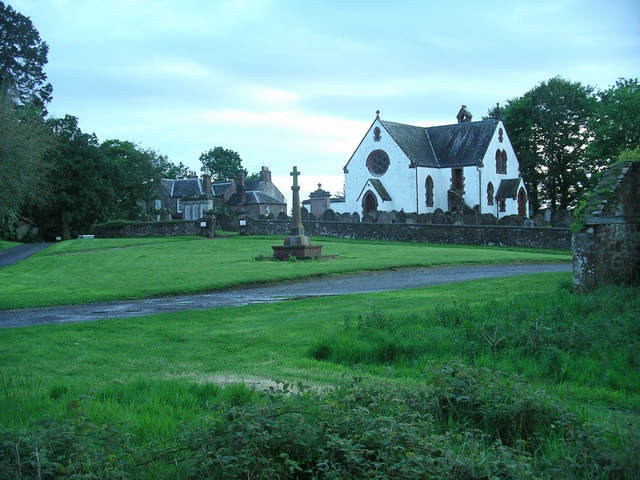
- Applegarthtown church, with the war memorial in the foreground

- Location within Dumfries and Galloway
- OS grid reference: NY1084
- Council area: Dumfries and Galloway
- Country: Scotland
- Sovereign state: United Kingdom
- Post town: LOCKERBIE
- Postcode district: DG11
- Dialling code: 01576
- Police: Scotland
- Fire: Scottish
- Ambulance: Scottish
- UK Parliament: Dumfriesshire, Clydesdale and Tweeddale
- Scottish Parliament: Dumfriesshire

Applegarthtown, also known as Applegarth or Applegirth, is a village near Lockerbie in Annandale, Dumfries and Galloway, Scotland.

Applegarthtown is situated on the east bank of the River Annan close to its junction with the Nethercleugh Burn. it is five kilometres (3.1 mi) west of Lockerbie. The name is derived from the Old Norse and means "apple-yard" or "orchard". Edward I of England offered oblation at a chapel in the parish in 1300 on his way to Caerlaverock.

The Jardine chiefs were established at Applegarth by the 14th century, The original seat of the Jardines of Applegarth was at Spedlins Tower, constructed in the 15th century over the site of a previous tower which had been the family seat since the 12th century. In the early 19th century the family seat was moved across the River Annan to Jardine Hall. The 7th Baronet of Applegirth, Sir William Jardine (1800–1874), was a well known naturalist and geologist.

There is believed to have been a church at Applegarthtown since the early 7th century. The current church, built in 1760, was closed in 2023 and was sold in 2025 by the Church of Scotland to the owners of the manse, who raised the purchase price by crowdfunding from Jardine family members and others. Friends of Applegarth Church has been registered as a charity.

Applegarth Primary School was founded by the Jardine family in the 19th century and is about three kilometres (1.9 mi) north north east of the village, across the A74(M) motorway. It was renovated and reopened in 1994.

The Applegarthtown Wildlife Sanctuary at nearby Dryfeholm was established in 1984 by converting a piece of low productivity agricultural land into a wetland to attract resident and migratory birds. An artificial sand bank was also created and this was colonised by sand martins. This has allowed scientists to study the breeding behaviour of the birds and has provided an example which has been replicated elsewhere.
