= Thomas R. Watjen =

American businessman (born c. 1955)

- Born: Thomas Ros Watjen c. 1955
- Education: Virginia Military Institute; University of Virginia Darden School of Business
- Known for: Former Chairman & CEO of Unum

Thomas R. Watjen (born c. 1955) is an American businessman. He is the former chairman and chief executive officer of Unum.

== Early life ==
Watjen was born circa 1955. He graduated from the Virginia Military Institute, where he earned a bachelor's degree in 1976, and he earned a master in business administration from the University of Virginia Darden School of Business in 1981.

== Career ==
Watjen first worked at Aetna, followed by Conning & Company. He was a managing director of Morgan Stanley from 1987 to 1994.

Watjen served as the executive vice president and chief financial officer of Provident Companies from 1994 to 1999, when it merged with Unum. He succeeded J. Harold Chandler as the chief executive officer of Unum in 2003, and he served until 2015. He was also the chairman from 2015 to 2017.

Watjen has served on the board of directors of SunTrust Banks since April 2010. He has also served on the board of Prudential plc since July 2017.
