= Clan Jardine =

Lowland Scottish clan

- Motto: Cave Adsum (Beware, I am coming!)

Profile
- Region: Lowlands
- District: Dumfriesshire
- Plant badge: Apple Blossom

Chief
- Sir William Murray Jardine of Applegirth
- The 13th Baronet of Applegarth
- Seat: Ash House
- Historic seat: Spedlings Tower; Jardine Hall
Septs of Clan Jardine
Jardine, Jardines, Gardino, Gardin, Gardinus, Garden, Jardin, Jardane, Jerdane, Jerden, Jerdone, Jarden, Jardyne, Jarding, Jardyn, Gerden, Gerdain, Gairdner, Gardynnyr, Gardynsr, Gardnsrd, Gardinare, Gardinar, Gardenar, Gardenare, Gardnare, Gardener, Gardennar, Gardnar, Gardiner, Gardner.
Clan branches
Scotland; Atlantic Provinces, Canada; New Zealand; Queensland, Australia; Mountain States, USA

Clan Jardine is a Scottish clan of the Scottish Lowlands.

== History ==
=== Origins of the clan ===
The surname Jardine is derived from jardin which is French for garden or orchard. However the genealogist, Black, has suggested that this does not mean that they were gardeners, but that they resided near to a garden.

The du Jardon family came over to England in 1066 with William the Conqueror. The name is first found in Scotland in charters to Kelso Abbey and Arbroath Abbey prior to 1153, when Wmfredus de Jardin appears as a witness. In about 1178 Humphrey de Jardin witnessed a charter by Robert Bruce to Arbroath Abbey.

The name Jardine is also found in the form of de Gardinus and Patrick de Gardinus was chaplain to the Bishop of Glasgow during the early thirteenth century. Sir Humphrey de Gardino witnessed a registration of the lands of Annandale in 1245.

Another variant of the name is found in the Ragman Rolls of 1296 where Jorden del Orchard appears rendering homage for his lands in Linlithgow to Edward I of England.

The chiefly line of the Clan Jardine appears to have been established by the fourteenth century at Applegirth on the River Annan in Dumfriesshire. Their first stronghold was Spedlings Tower which was abandoned in the late seventeenth century. From there the family moved across the river to Jardine Hall. This was allegedly to escape the ghost of a miller who had been left to starve to death in the tower's dungeon.

Y-DNA analysis informs us that the Clan Graham and the Clan Jardine share a male line ancestor, shortly before the two male lines got their Clan name. Both Jordan and Jardine surnames descent from the Jardine line. Since the closest Y-DNA matches are in the Middle East, another scenario for the etymology is possible: "du Jourdain" (from the Jordan river); "from" is used common in a relation to a recognizable city or river (see e.g. the Companions of William the Conqueror), less in relation to a common word like "garden".

=== 16th century and Anglo-Scottish Wars ===
Sir Alexander Jardine of Applegarth was actively involved in defending the Scottish Borders against English incursions. In 1524 Sir Alexander Jardine, along with Lord Maxwell attacked an English host near Carlisle and routed them, taking nearly three hundred English prisoners. However Alexander's son, John Jardine, faced English retribution in 1547 when Lord Wharton, with a force of over five thousand, overran Annandale. The Jardine lands were ravaged and he was forced to submit. Later that year the Jardines and some French troops harried the English and exacted a terrible retribution.

The Jardines followed the Clan Johnstone in supporting Mary, Queen of Scots. However, when the queen married the Earl of Bothwell the Jardines declared allegiance to the infant James VI of Scotland. For the support of his clan, Jardine was to receive a pension from the Archbishopric of Glasgow, but it was never paid.

=== 17th and 18th centuries ===
Another John Jardine, fourth in descent from Sir Alexander, married Margaret Douglas who was the sister of the first Duke of Queensberry. Their elder son, Alexander Jardine, was created a Baronet of Nova Scotia in 1672. The fourth baronet lived on the Continent and embraced the Catholic faith, becoming a Knight of the Sovereign Order of Malta. He died in 1790 and was succeeded by his brother, Sir William. Yet another William was Sir William Jardine, 7th Baronet who distinguished himself as an author and editor of works of natural history.

=== Modern history ===
Sir William Jardine, twelfth Baronet and twenty-third chief of Clan Jardine was active in promoting clan activities and also served on the Committee of the Council of Chiefs.

== Clan castles ==
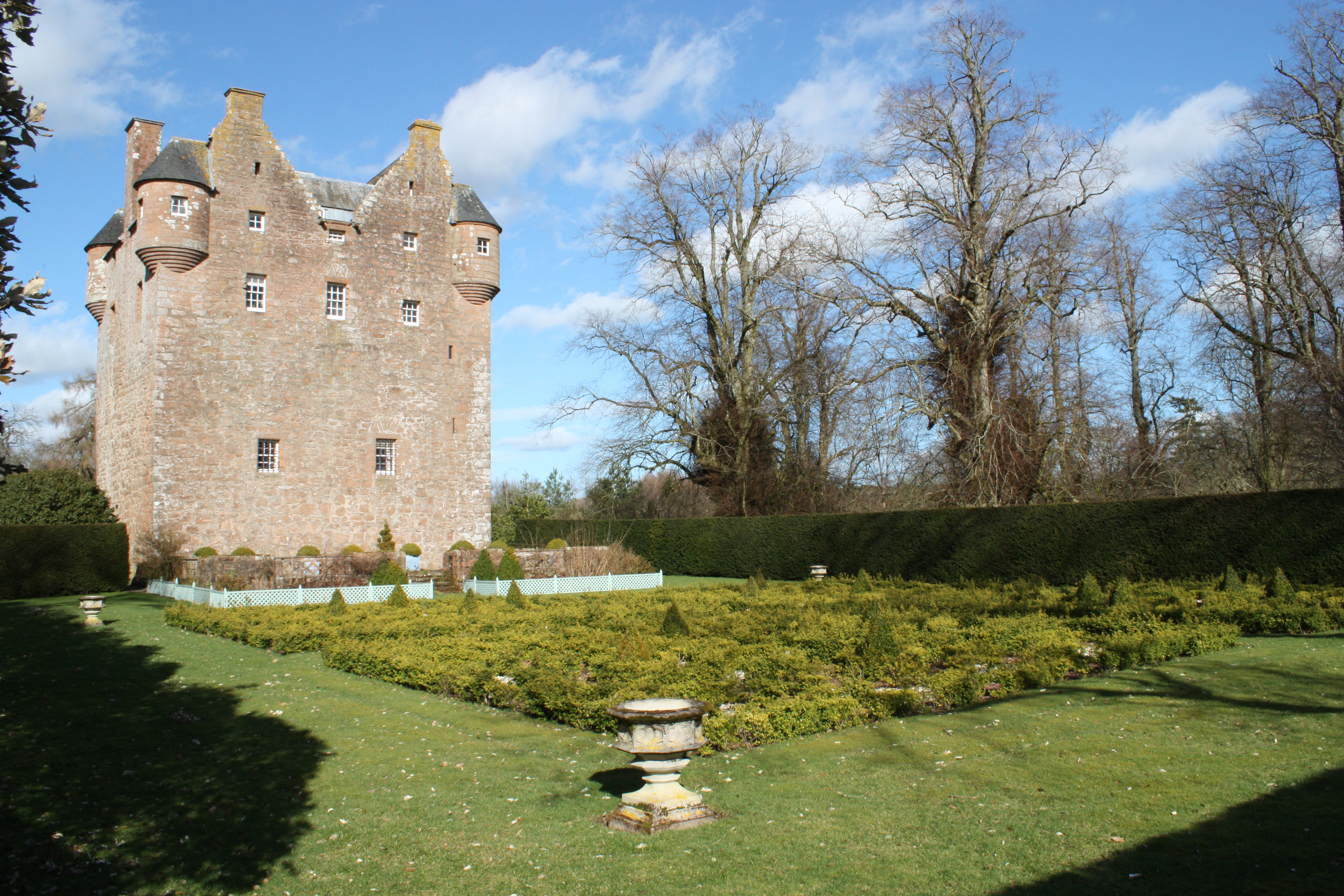
Spedlings (Spedlins) Tower, the original seat of the chiefs of Clan Jardine.

- Spedlings Tower was the original seat of the chiefs of Clan Jardine.
- Jardine Hall was the seat of the chiefs of Clan Jardine from the late seventeenth century.

== Clan profile ==
- Chief: Sir William Murray Jardine of Applegirth, 13th Baronet and Chief of the Name and Arms of Jardine.
- Chief's crest: A spur rowel of six points Proper
- Chief's arms: Argent, a Saltire Gules, on a chief of the last three mullets of the first pierced in the Second
- Chief's motto: Cave Adsum (Latin: Beware I am here)
- Plant badge: Apple blossom

== See also ==
- Scottish clan
- Jardine Baronets
- Jardine, notable people with Jardine surname
