= Robert Dallas =

English judge

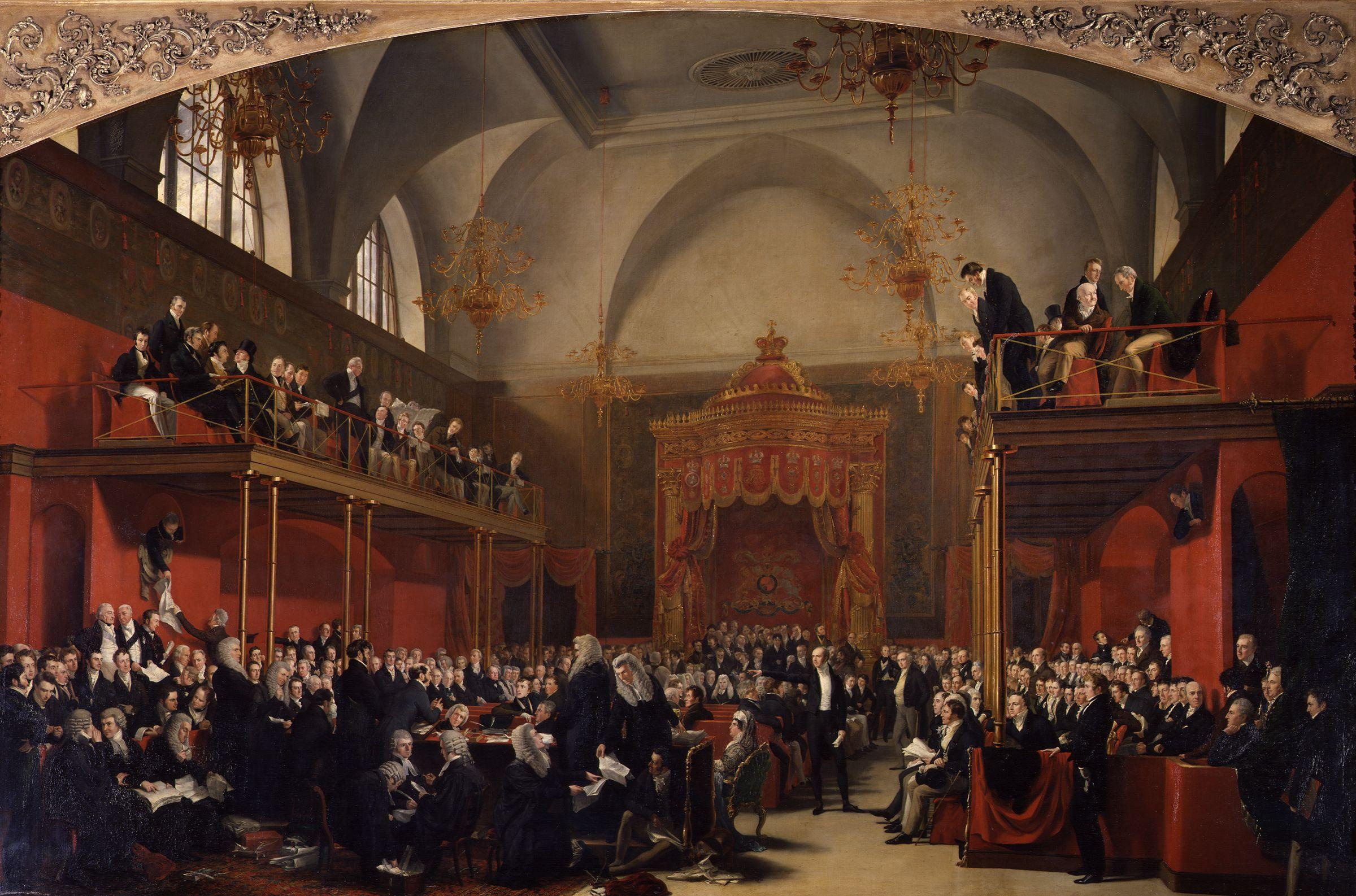

Sir Robert Dallas, PC, SL KC (16 October 1756 – 25 December 1824) was an English judge, of a Scottish family.

== Life and career ==
Robert Dallas was born at St Michael's, Cornhill, London. He and his brother George were educated first at James Elphinston's school in Kensington, and then in Geneva, by the pastor Chauvet. He entered Lincoln's Inn on 4 November 1777. During this period, he honed his facility of oratory at the public debates in Coachmaker's Hall, where he was known for his extensive general knowledge and his politeness.

Called to the bar on 6 November 1782, Dallas soon built a considerable practice, and specialized in parliamentary and privy council cases. In 1783, he was retained as junior counsel by the British East India Company to challenge the East India Bill.

Dallas's most notable accomplishment, perhaps, was to come in 1787, when he served as junior counsel for the defence in the Impeachment of Warren Hastings. Hasting's defence, led by Edward Law and seconded by Dallas and Thomas Plumer, formed a particularly able and harmonious legal team, and many of his contemporaries praised Dallas's exertions during the seven-year case. Hastings was exonerated in 1795, and Dallas took silk on 2 March 1795 and was elected a bencher of Lincoln's Inn on 23 April 1795.

Dallas continued to enjoy an active practice, receiving numerous briefs to assist parliamentary committees in investigating disputed elections. He briefly entered the House of Commons himself from 1802 until 1805 as Member of Parliament for the rotten borough of Mitchell, resigning in February 1805 to accept the office of Chief Justice of Chester. He re-entered Parliament in March, representing Dysart Burghs, but left that seat in 1806. While little active in the Commons, he was considered a useful supporter of Addington.

From 1806 until 1808, he led the defence of General Thomas Picton, and while he failed to obtain Picton's acquittal in his first trial, he was able to compel a retrial and secure a special verdict for him. He was retained by the Jamaican merchants and planters in 1807 to challenge the Slave Trade Act 1807, but without success.

Dallas did not neglect his judicial duties in Chester, during this period. He retained the position until 1813, when he resigned it to become Solicitor General on 6 May 1813, and was knighted on 19 May 1813. Towards the end of the year, he was made a serjeant-at-law and was made a puisne justice of the Court of Common Pleas on 18 November 1813, replacing Sir Vicary Gibbs, promoted to the Exchequer. In 1817, he was a member of the special commission which tried the leaders of the Pentrich Rising.

He was appointed Chief Justice of the Common Pleas and was sworn of the Privy Council on 19 November 1818. He headed, with Lord Chief Justice Charles Abbott, the special commission that tried the Cato Street conspirators in 1820, and presided over the trial of James Ings. In that year, the two also headed the judges attending the consideration of the Pains and Penalties Bill 1820 to advise the House of Lords on points of law. He retired on grounds of ill health at the end of 1823, and died in London on 25 December 1824.

Dallas was celebrated as both a barrister and a judge, for his command of the law, his clarity of statement, and his gracious and pleasing manners in both offices. In private, he enjoyed a "puckish" sense of humor, and his widow published a collection of his "Poetical Trifles" after his death. These include his famous epigram on Edmund Burke, his opponent in the trial of Hastings:

Oft have I wonder'd why on Irish ground
No poisonous reptile ever yet was found;
Reveal'd the secret stands of Nature's work,—
She saved her venom to create a Burke.

Dallas was married first, on 11 August 1788, to Charlotte Jardine, daughter of Alexander Jardine, by whom he had one son and one daughter; she died on 17 October 1792. On 10 September 1802, he married Giustina Davidson, by whom he had five daughters and who survived him.

== Notes ==
Parliament of the United Kingdom
Preceded by Sir Stephen Lushington, Bt; John Simpson	Member of Parliament for Mitchell; 1802–1805; With: Robert Sharpe Ainslie	Succeeded by Robert Sharpe Ainslie; Earl of Dalkeith
Preceded by Sir James St Clair-Erskine, Bt	Member of Parliament for Dysart Burghs; 1805–1806	Succeeded by Sir Ronald Crauford Ferguson
Legal offices
Preceded by Vicary Gibbs	Chief Justice of Chester; 1805–1813	Succeeded by Richard Richards
Preceded by Sir William Garrow	Solicitor General; 1813	Succeeded by Samuel Shepherd
Preceded by Sir Vicary Gibbs	Chief Justice of the Common Pleas; 1818–1824	Succeeded by The Lord Gifford
