= Rick McKenney =

American businessman

Richard McKenney
- Born: Eliot, Maine
- Occupations: CEO and president of Unum

Rick McKenney is an American businessman. He is currently known as the CEO of the insurance company Unum. Previously the Unum chief financial officer since 2009, in April 2015 he became CEO and president. Before Unum, he was CFO for Sun Life Financial and Genworth Financial. In 2016, he was on the Wall Street Journal CEO Council.

== Early life ==
He was born circa 1969. He is a native of Eliot, Maine and attended Marshwood High School where he was a multi-sport athlete and class of 1987 valedictorian. McKenney graduated from Tufts University with a BS in Mechanical Engineering.

== Career ==
He was with General Electric from 1991 to 2004. He was then the CFO of Genworth Financial and Sun Life Financial. He was Genworth Financial from 2004 to 2007 and with Sun Life Financial from 2007 to 2009. He became CFO and executive vice president of Unum in August 2009, joining from Sun Life in Canada. He was CFO of Unum until he became CEO. He replaced Unum president and CEO Thomas Watjen in April 2015, joining as well the Unum board.

McKenney earned $5.7 million in 2016.
