= Colonial Life & Accident Insurance Company =

American insurance company

Colonial Life
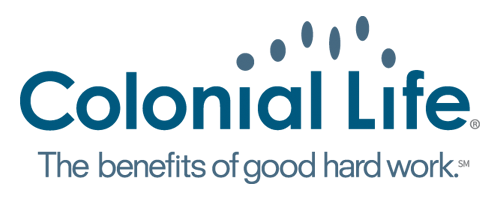
- Type: Subsidiary
- Industry: Insurance
- Founded: 1939; 87 years ago
- Founder: Edwin F. Averyt
- Headquarters: Columbia, South Carolina
- Area served: United States
- Key people: Timothy G. Arnold (President and CEO)
- Products: Personal Insurance Products; Accident Insurance; Cancer Insurance; Critical Illness Insurance; Dental Insurance; Disability Insurance; Life Insurance; Supplemental Health Insurance
- Parent: Unum (NYSE: UNM)
- Website: ColonialLife.com

Colonial Life & Accident Insurance Company is an American insurance company based in Columbia, South Carolina. Colonial Life offers disability, accident, life, cancer, critical illness and hospital confinement insurance plans in 49 states. Colonial Life was founded in 1939 by Edwin Averyt and became a wholly owned subsidiary of Unum in 1993.

Tim Arnold has served as Colonial Life's chief executive since January 2015.

== History ==
=== Independent company ===
Colonial Life's history traces back to 1929 when company founder Edwin Averyt was working as a bond salesman and met with a former University of Alabama classmate who was successful at selling individual accident insurance policies. Averyt later moved to South Carolina to become the regional manager of a firm that sold savings bonds, United Securities Company of Kansas City, Missouri. In 1937, he earned a $2,000 commission. He raised an additional $3,000 from investors and founded Mutual Accident Company the same year. Mutual Accident Company originally sold $1,000 accident policies for $3 annually; policies that were very similar to the policies sold by Averyt's former classmate.

Mutual Accident Company was converted to a stockholder company in 1939 and was later renamed as Colonial Life & Accident Insurance Company. Edwin Averyt served as company chief executive until 1970 when failing health forced his retirement. His son, Gayle, replaced Averyt as chief executive. Colonial Life began offering accident and cancer insurance policies to employees using pre-tax dollars in 1985. These policies accounted for half of all new policies issued by the company by 1990. In 1989, Colonial Life created a holding company, Colonial Companies, Inc. Colonial Life became a wholly owned subsidiary of Colonial Companies. In March 1991, Stephen G. Hall was named chief executive of Colonial Life. Hall had served as company president since 1986. Gayle Averyt retained chairmanship of the company. Hall resigned from Colonial Life in February 1992 and was replaced by Frank Smith.

=== Unum subsidiary ===
Unum acquired Colonial Life in 1993 for $571 million. James Orr, Unum's chief executive, assumed the position of Colonial Life chief executive with the merger. In 2003, Colonial became the named sponsor of the University of South Carolina's basketball arena. The company agreed to pay $5.5 million over 12 years for the name rights to Colonial Life Arena. Randall Horn became Colonial Life president and chief executive officer in 2004. He replaced Jean Duke.

In 2014, Colonial Life completed a Habitat for Humanity building project during its 75th anniversary. In July 2014, Timothy G. Arnold became the company's president. He assumed the role of chief executive in early 2015. Through the acquisition of Starmount, Colonial Life became active with dental in 2016. In 2017, Colonial Life opened a new office in Virginia, to serve the Virginia and Washington, D.C. areas. The company has also expanded in Georgia.

== Operations ==
Colonial Life sells voluntary insurance products for employees. The company issues insurance policies in the disability, accident, life, critical illness, hospital confinement and cancer segments. Its products are marketed by independent insurance agents and brokers.

The company is headquartered in Columbia, South Carolina. Colonial Life is wholly owned by Unum, but operates as an independent subsidiary. Colonial Life is one of Unum's three major business segments and accounted for 15% of Unum's premium income for the year 2012. Tim Arnold is Colonial Life's chief executive.

== See also ==
- Colonial Life Arena
- List of United States insurance companies
