= David Jardine =

David Jardine may refer to:

- David Jardine (barrister) (1794–1860), English barrister and magistrate
- David Jardine (footballer) (1867-?), Scottish football goalkeeper
- David Jardine (merchant) (1818–1856), taipan of the Jardine, Matheson & Co.

== See also ==
- David Jardine Jardine (1847–1922), Scottish landowner and racehorse owner
