= Corey Miller (American football) =

American football player (born 1968)

No. 57, 55
- Position: Linebacker

Personal information
- Born: October 25, 1968 (age 58); Pageland, South Carolina, U.S.
- Listed height: 6 ft 2 in (1.88 m)
- Listed weight: 252 lb (114 kg)

Career information
- High school: Pageland (SC) Central
- College: South Carolina
- NFL draft: 1991: 6th round, 167th overall pick

Career history
- New York Giants (1991–1998); Minnesota Vikings (1999)

Career NFL statistics
- Tackles: 252
- Sacks: 14
- Forced fumbles: 6
- Interceptions: 7
- Stats at Pro Football Reference

Corey James Miller (born October 25, 1968) is an American former professional football player who was a linebacker in the National Football League (NFL) for the New York Giants and Minnesota Vikings. He played college football for the South Carolina Gamecocks and was selected in the sixth round of the 1991 NFL draft.

In 2007, Corey was the head coach for the Columbia Stingers of the National Indoor Football League.

Pre-draft measurables
Height	Weight	Arm length	Hand span	Bench press
6 ft 1 5/8 in (1.87 m)	252 lb (114 kg)	34 in (0.86 m)	10 in (0.25 m)	26 reps

Corey Miller's son Christian Miller also played in the NFL as a linebacker.

== See also ==
- History of the New York Giants (1994-present)
