= William Jardine =

William Jardine may refer to:

- William Jardine (merchant), Scottish surgeon and merchant, one of the founders of Jardine, Matheson & Co.
- Sir William Jardine, 7th Baronet (1800–1874), Scottish naturalist
- William Marion Jardine (1879–1959), U.S. secretary of agriculture (1925–1929), U.S. ambassador to Egypt (1930–1933)
- Sir William Murray Jardine, 13th Baronet (born 1984), chief of Clan Jardine
- William Jardine, editor of the Farmers' Almanac

== See also ==
- William Jardine Smith, Australian writer
