= Forbes Macbean =

Lieutenant-General Forbes Macbean FRS
- Born: 1725
- Died: 11 November 1800 (aged 75); Woolwich, England
- Military career
- Allegiance: Kingdom of Great Britain; Kingdom of Portugal (1763–1769)
- Branch: British Army; Portuguese Army (1763–1769)
- Service years: 1745–1800
- Rank: Lieutenant-General
- Unit: Royal Artillery
- Commands: Inspector-General of Portuguese artillery; Royal Invalid Artillery
- Conflicts: War of the Austrian Succession; Jacobite Rising of 1745; Seven Years' War

Lieutenant-General Forbes Macbean FRS (1725 – 11 November 1800) was a British Army officer of the Royal Artillery.

== Biography ==
Macbean was born 28 June 1725, the son of the Reverend Alexander MacBean of Inverness and his wife Marjory, daughter of John MacBean, the son of William MacBean of Inverness; although some have cited him as the son of John MacBean Sheriff Clerk of Inverness who was a brother to William MacBean of Faillie in Strathnairn; this is not correct as that man's daughter 'Margaret' was born three years after Rev. Alexander married his wife Marjory. He entered the Royal Military Academy, Woolwich, as a cadet-matross on 16 July 1743, and passed out as a lieutenant-fireworker on 25 March 1745. Three weeks after his appointment in 1745 Macbean marched with the artillery from Ghent, and had command of two guns at the battle of Fontenoy on 30 April 1745. On the news of the Jacobite rising in Scotland, the four companies of artillery of the Duke of Cumberland's army were sent home. Macbean joined Cumberland's army at Lichfield, and served at the siege of Carlisle in December 1745. In the following summer he went back to the Low Countries, and made the campaigns of 1746–48, commanding the battalion of the 19th Regiment of Foot at the battle of Roucoux, and a detachment of two guns at the battle of Val.

In 1755, Macbean was selected to command an artillery detachment in Ireland, but with the adjutancy at Woolwich falling vacant at the same time, he purchased its commission (and the attendant rank of first lieutenant) under the system then in force. While in this office he was promoted to captain-lieutenant on 1 April 1756, and he held it until promoted to captain and the command of a company on 1 January 1759.

In April 1759, he proceeded with his company to Germany, and commanded the heavy brigade of British artillery in the campaigns of 1759–60. At the battle of Minden in August 1759, where his brigade consisted of ten medium 12-pounders manned by two companies, he rendered conspicuous services, for which he received an autograph letter of thanks from Field Marshal Prince Ferdinand of Brunswick and a gratuity of 500 crowns. He was again distinguished at the battle of Warburg on 30 July 1760, and at Fritzlar on 12 February 1761, where he commanded a brigade of eight heavy 12-pounders. On his return home on sick leave soon after, he was recommended to the king by Prince Ferdinand for some special mark of royal favour, which he never received. In 1762 he embarked with his company for service in the Portuguese Campaign under the Count of Lippe, of which he left a manuscript account placed in the Royal Artillery Institution, Woolwich. Macbean was one of the British officers allowed to return to Portugal, on the prospect of a renewed conflict with Spain the year after. He was appointed a colonel of the Portuguese Army's artillery, and in 1765 Inspector-General of Portuguese artillery, a post he held for four years, receiving a very handsome testimonial from Sebastião José de Carvalho e Melo, Conde d'Oeiras, the Portuguese secretary of state, on his departure.

Macbean commanded a company of artillery in Canada in 1769–73, and at home in 1773–77. In March 1778, he was appointed to command the Royal Artillery in Canada, in succession to Major-General Thomas Phillips, and in 1780, on the prospect of an American invasion, was appointed to the left brigade, consisting of the 31st, 44th, and 84th regiments, covering Sorel, on which, as on various other occasions, his services received the approbation of General Frederick Haldimand. Macbean was made a Fellow of the Royal Society in 1786, being the second artillery officer to receive that distinction (the first was Thomas Desaguliers). The artillery service was greatly indebted to him for his private notes and memoranda, without which much valuable information relating to the earlier history of the corps would have been lost.

Macbean, a lieutenant-general and colonel-commandant, Royal Invalid Artillery, died at his residence by Woolwich Common on 11 November 1800. His widow died at Greenwich in 1818, aged 88.

A street in central Woolwich is named after him.
