= David Smiles Jerdan =

Scottish businessman and horticulturalist (1871–1951)

David Smiles Jerdan FRSE (1871–1951) was a Scottish businessman and horticulturist.

== Life ==
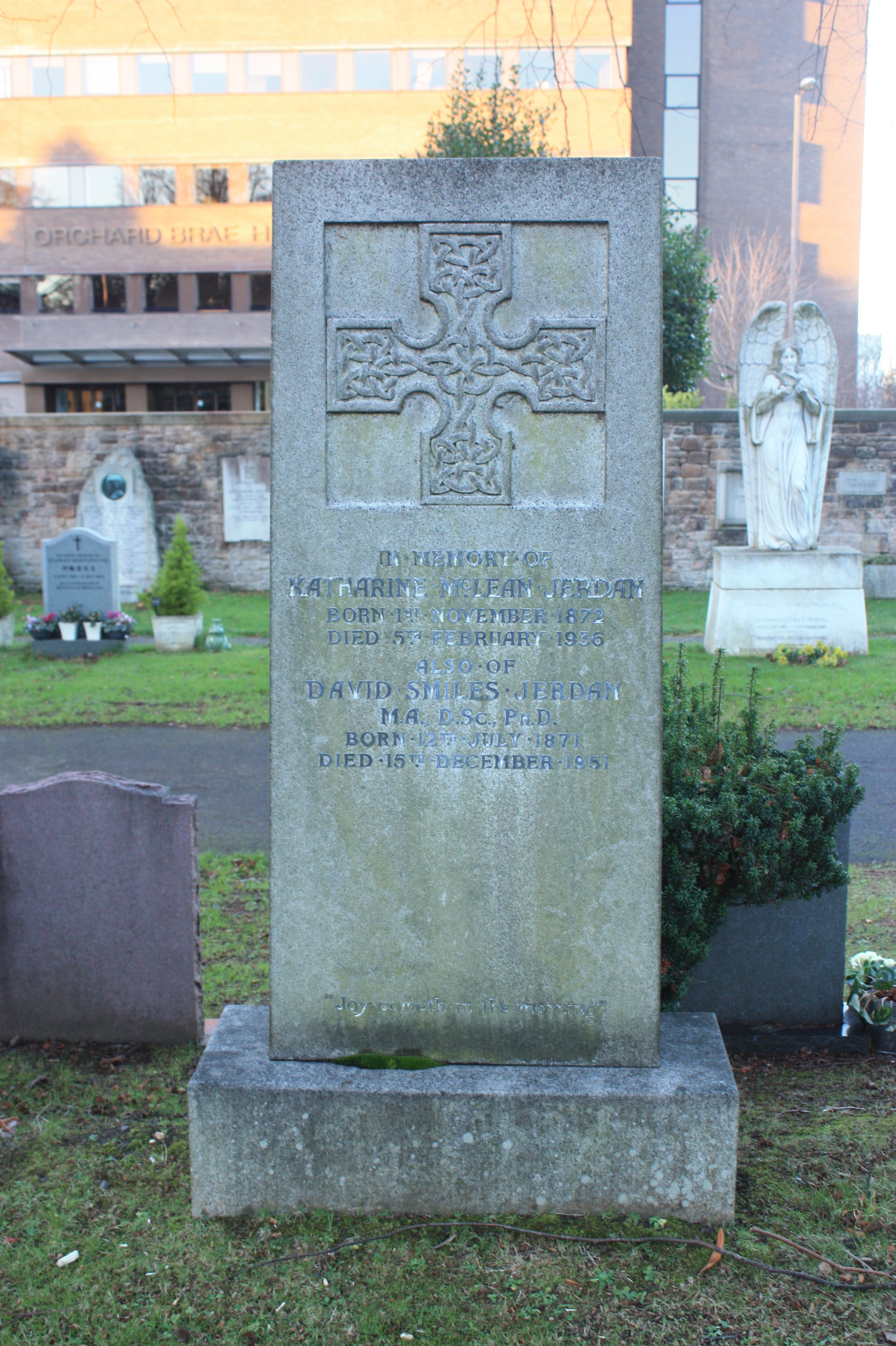
The grave of David Smiles Jerdan, Dean Cemetery

He was born on 12 July 1871 in Dennyloanhead in Stirlingshire in Central Scotland. His father was Rev Charles Jerdan, minister of St Michael Street Church in Greenock.

He graduated MA from Glasgow University in 1892. He then did further postgraduate studies at the University of Heidelberg where he gained a PhD and Victoria University of Manchester, where he gained a DSc.

He was Manager of J & G Cox Ltd, glue and gelatine manufacturers at Gorgie Mills in Edinburgh. From here he moved to the linked trade of tanning, becoming Manager of the Tannerie Maroquinerie in Brussels. He later returned to Scotland as Director of A & G Paterson Ltd timber merchants at 60 to 68 Tennant Street in Glasgow.

In 1900, he was elected a Fellow of the Royal Society of Edinburgh. His proposers were Sir John Murray, Alexander Crum Brown, Robert Irvine and John Gibson.

He died on 5 December 1951. He is buried in the 20th century north extension to Dean Cemetery in western Edinburgh with his wife, KatherineMcLean Jerdan (1872–1936).

== Publications ==
- The Direct Union of Carbon and Hydrogen (1897) co-written with William Arthur Bone.
