= Jeanne Jardine =

British domestic writer (fl. 1894–1914)

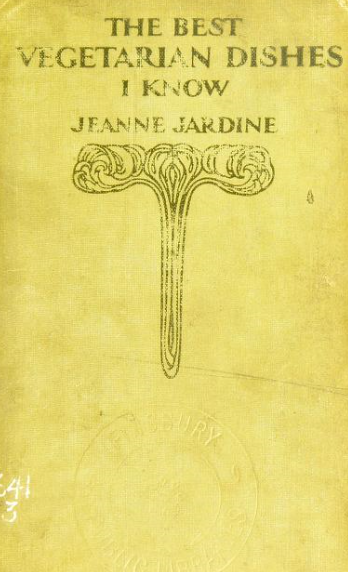
- Cover of The Best Vegetarian Dishes I Know (1910)
- Occupations: Writer; columnist
- Writing career
- Language: English
- Period: 1894–1914
- Subjects: Food; household management
- Notable work: The Best Vegetarian Dishes I Know (1910)

Jeanne Jardine (fl. 1894–1914) was a British domestic writer and columnist on food and household management. Her early published work included the regular domestic advice column in Woman, "Chats with Young Housewives" (starting in 1894) and the vegetarian recipe articles "Capital Vegetarian Dishes" in The Vegetarian in 1895. She later contributed columns to The Ladies' Field, wrote chapters for books on home life and gardening, and published the 1910 vegetarian cookbook The Best Vegetarian Dishes I Know, which included 107 recipes and was reviewed in British and American periodicals.

== Career ==
By January 1894, Jardine was writing "Chats with Young Housewives", a regular domestic advice column in Woman. In April 1895, she published recipes for "Capital Vegetarian Dishes" in The Vegetarian, a periodical of the London Vegetarian Society.

In 1898, Jardine contributed the chapter "The Responsibilities of a Mother" to The Lady at Home and Abroad. She contributed to The Ladies' Field from 1898 to 1914, including the weekly column "Menage and Means". Kate Jackson describes "Jeanne Jardine" as the named cookery adviser for The Ladies' Field and states that she handled cookery correspondence for the magazine. In 1909, she authored the chapter "Cooking Vegetables" for The English Vegetable Garden: Written by Experts.

=== The Best Vegetarian Dishes I Know ===
Jardine's The Best Vegetarian Dishes I Know, a cookbook of 107 vegetarian recipes, was published in 1910. In the foreword, she wrote:

It is frequently asserted that a vegetarian diet is more costly than a meat diet, but those who adopt it will find that the extra cost of butter, milk, and eggs in a month will compare favourably with the butcher's bill for the same period.

A review in The Guardian described the book as clear and practical. It stated that readers could soon become self-sufficient cooks and referred to the book's account of an omelette technique often omitted from other guides. The Independent called it "helpful to the perplexed cook or housewife who must arrange hot-weather menus." The Guardian Journal described it as a practical cookbook for vegetarians who exclude fish, and noted its use of beans and peas, which the review said deserved more attention in British cooking.

== Publications ==
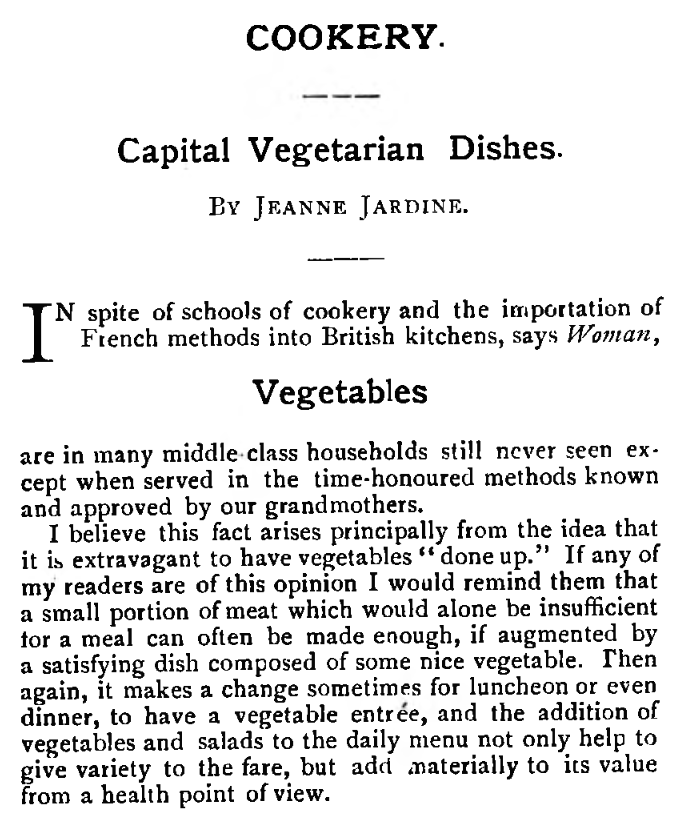
Extract from "Capital Vegetarian Dishes", 1895

=== Articles ===
- "Capital Vegetarian Dishes". The Vegetarian. 8 (14). London Vegetarian Society: 174. 6 April 1895.
- "Capital Vegetarian Dishes (continued)". The Vegetarian. 8 (15). London Vegetarian Society: 186. 13 April 1895.
- "Capital Vegetarian Dishes (concluded)". The Vegetarian. 8 (16). London Vegetarian Society: 198. 20 April 1895.
- "Practical Talks About Children". McCall's Magazine. 38 (2): 202–203. October 1910.

=== Books ===
- The Best Vegetarian Dishes I Know. London: J. M. Dent & Sons. 1910.

=== Chapters ===
- "The Responsibilities of a Mother". The Lady at Home and Abroad. 1898. pp. 157–180.
- "Cooking Vegetables". The English Vegetable Garden: Written by Experts. London: Charles Scribner's Sons. 1909. pp. 288–308.

=== Columns ===
- "Menage and Means". The Ladies' Field. 1898–1914.
- "Chats with Young Housewives". Woman.

== See also ==
- British cuisine
- History of vegetarianism
- Vegetarianism in the Victorian era
- Vegetarianism in the United Kingdom
- Women and vegetarianism and veganism advocacy
- Women in the Victorian era
