= Unum =

American insurance company

Unum Group
- Formerly: Union Mutual (1848–1986); Unum Corporation (1986–1999); UnumProvident Corporation (1999–2007)
- Type: Public company
- Traded as: NYSE: UNM; S&P 400 component
- ISIN: US91529Y1064
- Industry: Employee group benefits (disability, dental, life and critical illness insurance)
- Founded: 1848; 178 years ago
- Headquarters: Chattanooga, Tennessee, U.S.
- Key people: Rick McKenney, President and CEO; Kevin Kabat, Chairman of the Board; Steve Zabel, CFO
- Revenue: ▼US$11.991 billion (2022)
- Operating income: ▲US$19.32 billion (2022)
- Net income: ▲US$13.14 billion (2022)
- Total assets: ▼US$61.435 billion (2022)
- Total equity: ▼US$9.198 billion (2022)
- Number of employees: 10,937 (2022)
- Website: unumgroup.com

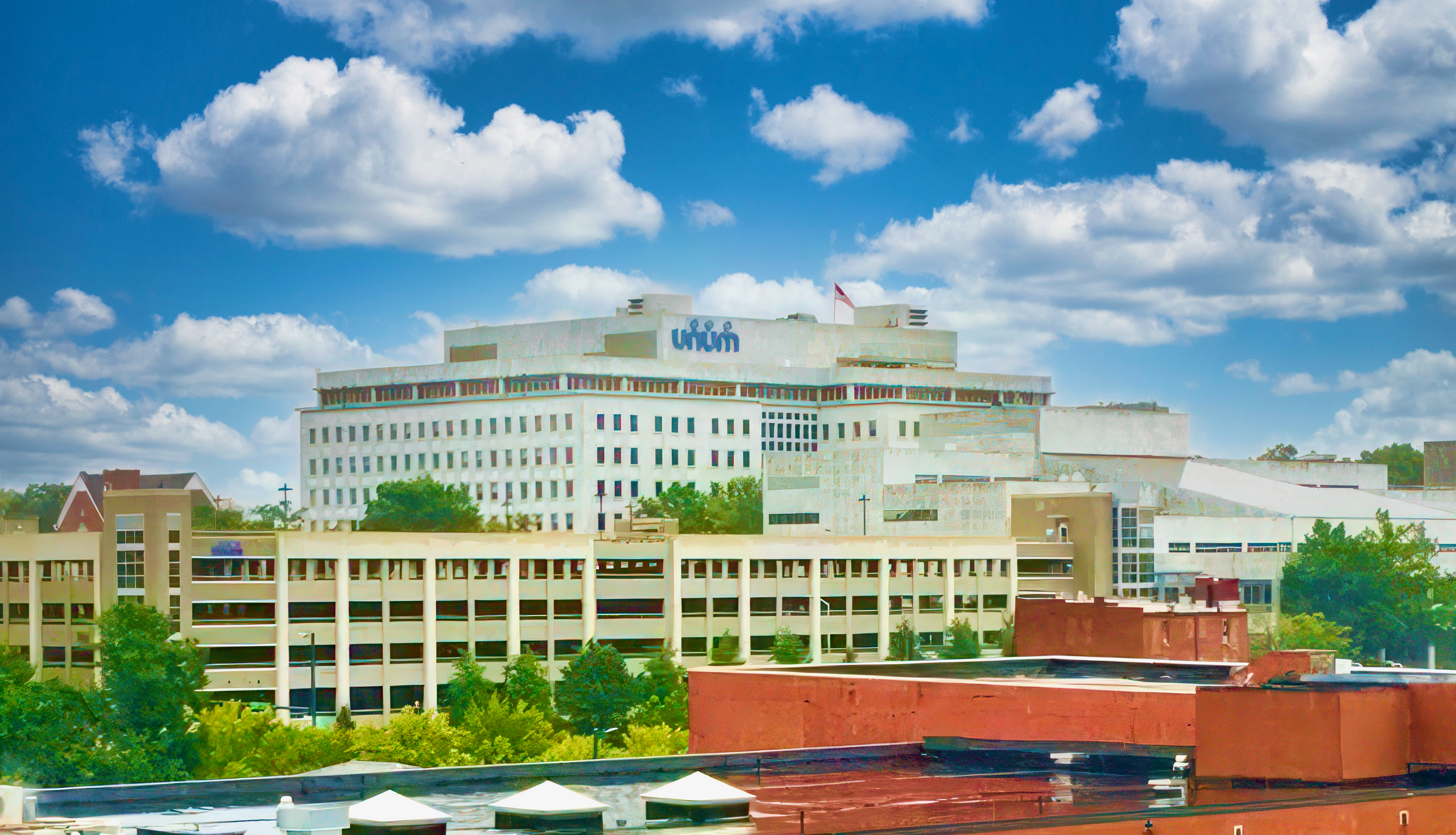
Unum's headquarters in Chattanooga, Tennessee

Unum Group (stylized as uṅu̇ṁ) is an American insurance company headquartered in Chattanooga, Tennessee. Founded as Union Mutual in 1848 and known as UnumProvident from 1999–2007, the company is part of the Fortune 500. Unum Group was created by the 1999 merger of Unum Corporation and The Provident Companies and comprises four distinct businesses – Unum US, Unum UK, Unum Poland and Colonial Life. Its underwriting insurers include The Paul Revere Life Insurance Company and Provident Life and Accident Insurance Company.

As of 2018, Unum was the third-largest disability insurer in the United States. Unum also offers other insurance products including accident, critical illness and life insurance as well as workplace leave management and mental health. In 2022, Unum insured about 45 million individuals through group policies and reported revenue of $11.991 billion.

== History ==
=== Founding as Unum corporation ===
Union Mutual Life Insurance was incorporated in 1848 in Maine. The company issued its first policy, which covered the life of founder and company president Elisha B. Pratt for $5000 (equivalent to $193,500 in 2025), on October 1, 1849. Union Mutual's principal office at the time was located in Boston, Massachusetts, where Pratt resided. Union Mutual remained headquartered in Boston until 1881, when the state of Maine passed a law that required the principal office and headquarters of all insurance companies incorporated by the state to be located within the state. The company relocated to Portland, Maine.

In 1940, the company acquired most of Massachusetts Accident Company's health and accident insurance business. The acquisition was Union Mutual's first expansion beyond individual life and endowment insurance. In 1969, Union Mutual established the insurance industry's first downstream holding company, which facilitated the company's continued expansion and diversification. Union Mutual also established its group disability business in the 1960s. Group disability would become the company's flagship product.

Union Mutual became the first major mutual insurance company to demutualize in 1986. Company CEO Colin Hampton had been pushing for demutualization since 1970 and the company formally began the process of converting to a publicly held company in January 1985. Union Mutual, now renamed Unum, began trading on the New York Stock Exchange in November 1986.

The company also began selling off underperforming businesses during the 1980s. From 1982 to 1990, Unum abandoned many insurance products, including medical insurance, individual life insurance, general investment contracts, and individual annuities and pensions. Under the leadership of then-CEO James Orr, the company turned its focus to long-term group disability insurance.

In March 1990, Unum acquired National Employers Life Assurance Holdings, which at the time was the United Kingdom's largest disability insurer. The company later acquired Duncanson & Holt, a reinsurer and insurance underwriter for the accident and health insurance sectors. In 1993, Unum acquired the Colonial Companies, parent company of Colonial Life & Accident Insurance Company. Colonial focused on individual insurance products, including accident, cancer and life insurance policies. Unum began offering individual disability policies under the Unum brand once again in 1995.

=== Growth as the Provident companies ===
The Provident companies was founded in Chattanooga, Tennessee in May 1887 as Mutual Medical Aid and Accident Insurance Company. The company originally specialized in providing both medical-aid and accident insurance to employees in high-risk industries, including miners and coal workers. Within a few months, the company’s founders became concerned that a single disease epidemic would bankrupt the company. Mutual Medical Aid and Accident purchased back all outstanding medical-aid policies and reincorporated as Provident Accident Insurance Company. Provident only issued accident policies.

In 1892, Thomas Maclellan and John McMaster purchased a 50% stake in the company for $1000. The two men purchased the remaining 50% equity in 1895 and Maclellan was the company's sole owner and president by 1900. Maclellan reorganized the company from being mutually held to a stock company in 1910.

Thomas Maclellan served as president of Provident until he was struck by an automobile and unexpectedly died 1916. Robert Jardine Maclellan, the son of Thomas and Helen Maclellan, and the maternal grandson of railroad promoter Robert Jardine, assumed the presidency of Provident following his father's death. Provident began selling life insurance the following year, in 1917, and the first life insurance policy issued by the company covered Robert Maclellan's life. The company also began offering railroad insurance.

Provident wrote its first group policy in 1924. The company expanded its operations with its 1926 acquisition of Detroit, Michigan-based Standard Accident Company. Provident operated in 34 states by 1928. It also acquired Southern Surety Company in 1931 and Meridian Insurance of West Virginia in 1938. The company expanded into Canada in 1948.

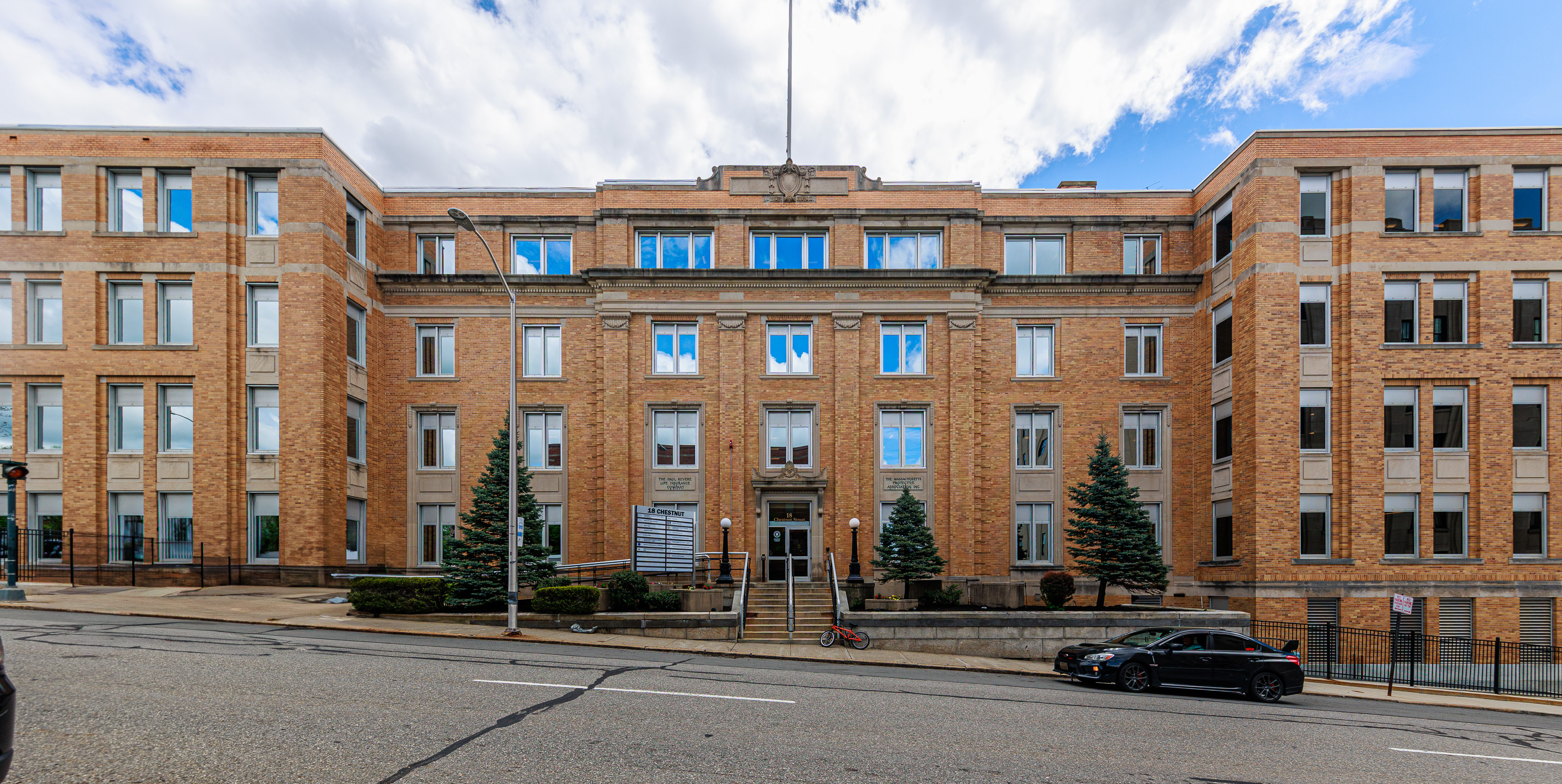
Paul Revere Life Insurance Company building in Worcester

In November 1993, J. Harold Chandler became president and chief executive officer of Provident. Chandler had previously served as a senior executive at NationsBank. Chandler initiated a company-wide restructuring at Provident, which included the 1995 sale of its health-related business to Healthsource for $231 million. Provident also increased its focus on individual disability and life policies with the 1997 acquisition of the Paul Revere Corporation, a Worcester, Massachusetts-based provider of individual disability insurance, from Textron for $1.2 billion. The purchase of Paul Revere made Provident the nation's largest provider of individual disability policies.

=== Unum Group (1999–present) ===
Unum and Provident of Chattanooga, Tennessee announced their intention to merge in November 1998. When the merger was completed in 1999, the new company, named UnumProvident, was the United States' largest disability insurance provider. Then-Unum chairman and chief executive James Orr was retained in as chairman and CEO of UnumProvident, which was headquartered in Portland, Maine.

Company Chief Operating Officer J. Harold Chandler, who had served as Provident's chief executive prior to the merger, succeeded Orr as UnumProvident CEO in November 1999. The company sold Provident National Assurance, a holding company for its life insurance and variable annuity business, to Allstate in 2001. In 2002, UnumProvident relocated its headquarters from Portland, Maine to Chattanooga, Tennessee. The former Provident Companies was headquartered in Chattanooga.

Unum received negative attention in 2002, when California regulators fined Unum, and alleged that the company inappropriately denied long-term disability insurance claims. Unum stated that "only 2% of the policyholders who filed a claim with the company last year [2001] were found not to be disabled, an amount consistent with prior experience."

UnumProvident acquired Sun Life Financial's United Kingdom-based group insurance business in 2003. Thomas Watjen replaced Orr as UnumProvident’s chief executive later that year. The company also sold its Japanese and Argentine businesses.

In 2004, Unum entered into a regulatory settlement agreement (RSA) with insurance regulators in over 40 states. The settlement related to Unum's handling of disability claims and required the company "to make significant changes in corporate governance, implement revisions to claim procedures and provide for a full re-examination of both reassessed claims and disability insurance claim decisions after the January 2005 effective date of the RSA." The review was completed in 2008, and resulted in a 41.7% reversal, "in whole or part", and an additional $676.2 million of benefits paid nationwide by Unum. The state of Maine press release announcing the result, praised regulators for their work, and the company for coming into compliance. The company was involved with the UK's controversial Welfare Reform Bill in 2007 and was investigated by the BBC in England at that time.

In 2007, UnumProvident was renamed Unum. The Unum moniker was last used by the Unum Corporation prior to the 1999 merger. In 2012 and 2013, Unum partnered with the Consumer Federation of America to release reports which examined the use of disability insurance by American workers. According to numbers released by the Bureau of Labor Statistics that were cited by the report, two-thirds of American workers do not carry disability insurance policies. In addition, the report found that, among other things, workers know little about disability insurance, despite expecting financial hardship if they were to become unable to work.

In 2008 Unum opened its IT centre of excellence in Carlow, Ireland, and continued to digitize its finance operations, and to invest in technology, in the U.S. and abroad during the following decades.

Richard McKenney has led Unum as its CEO since April 1, 2015. Unum UK entered the dental insurance market with acquisitions of National Dental Plan, then Starmount Life, in 2015 and 2016, respectively. As of December 2016, Unum had 9,400 full-time employees and annual revenues of $11.047 billion.

From 2019, Unum Group has been named annually among The Civic 50 by Points of Light.

In 2022, Unum Group provided coverage to about 45 million people with 10,937 employees, and reported revenue of $11.991 billion.

In 2023, subsidiary Colonial Life & Accident Insurance Company launched Gathr, a proprietary HR tech and benefits administration platform for small businesses.

== Corporate structure and company culture ==
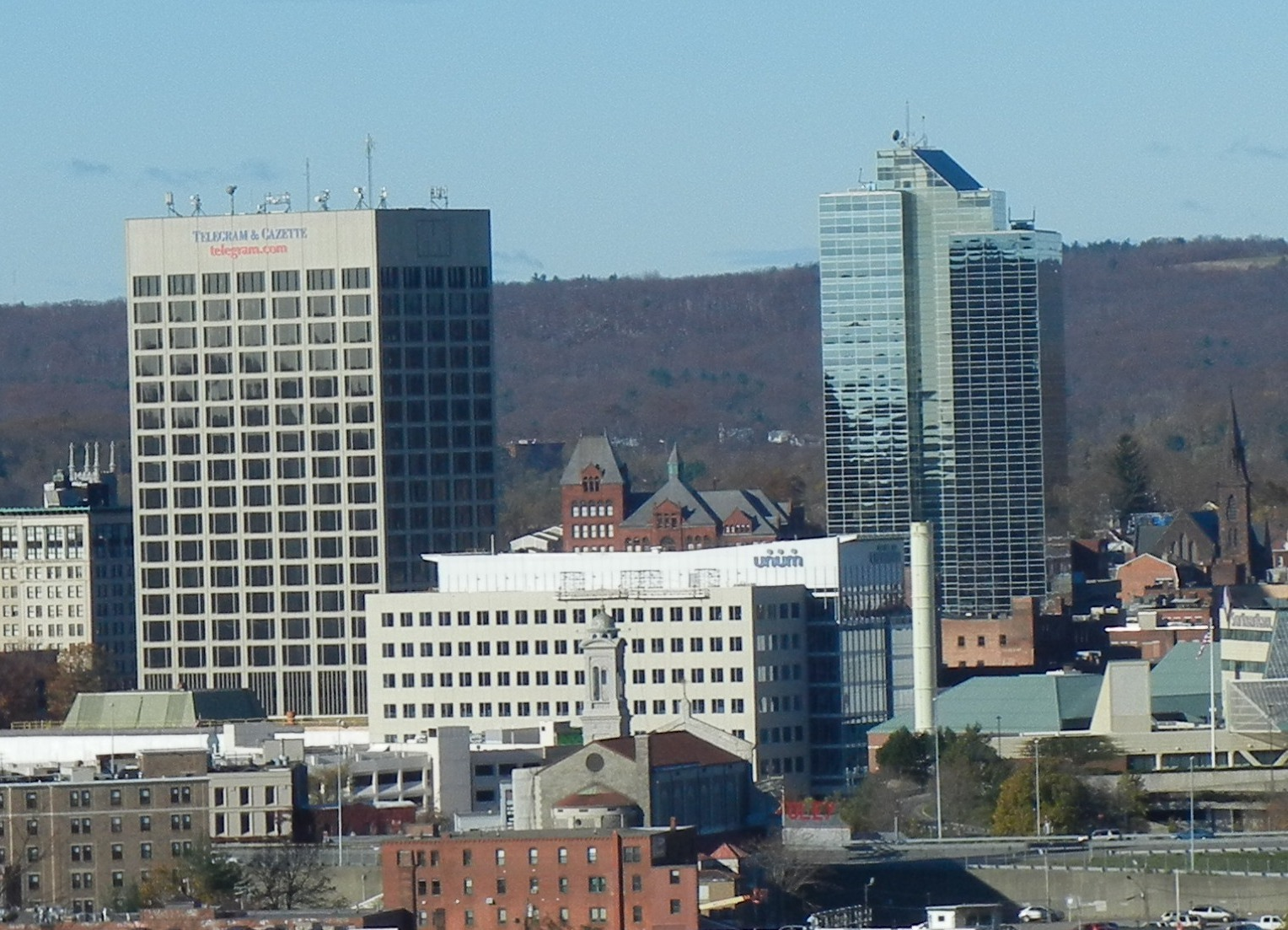
Unum Group's Worcester office at One Mercantile Place in downtown Worcester, Massachusetts

Unum Group is headquartered in Chattanooga, Tennessee, and maintains offices in Portland, Maine; Columbia, South Carolina; Baton Rouge, Louisiana; Atlanta, Georgia; Milton Court, Dorking, Surrey, Basingstoke and Hampshire, England, Warsaw, Poland and Carlow, County Carlow, Ireland. Thomas Watjen served as Unum Group president and chief executive from 2003 until his retirement in 2015. Watjen became Chairman of the Unum Group Board of Directors on May 21, 2015. He was succeeded as President and CEO by Richard McKenny.

Unum is divided into five business segments: Unum US, Unum UK, Unum Ireland, Unum Poland and Colonial Life. It is one of the world’s largest providers of employee benefits as group disability insurance, as well as group benefits, life insurance and other services.

During the 2010s, Unum collaborated with Oxford Economics, among others, to analyze staff engagement and retention, subsequently designing policies and adding benefits to nurture company loyalty. It continually develops policies and programs that target inclusivity, compliance security. and environmental sustainability.

The company is a long-time participant of the Maine Heart Walk, with COO Mike Simonds serving as the event’s chairman in 2021. Unum Group has been named annually to several Forbes’ lists, including America’s Best Largest Employers and America’s Best Employers for Diversity, and, since 2021, among Ethisphere’s World’s Most Ethical Companies.

== Finance ==
The key financial trends for Unum Group are based on fiscal years ending December 31.

Year	Revenue (USD Billion)	Gross Profit (USD Billion)	Net Income (USD Billion)
1994	3.62	3.62	0.155
1995	4.12	4.12	0.281
2000	9.43	9.43	0.564
2005	10.44	9.52	0.513
2010	10.19	9.89	0.886
2015	10.73	10.39	0.867
2020	13.16	13.16	0.793
2021	12.01	11.80	0.981
2022	11.99	11.52	1.41
2023	12.39	11.93	1.28
2024	12.79	6.01	1.78

== Awards ==
- Forbes' America's 100 Most Trustworthy Companies 2013
- Forbes' America's Most Reputable Companies 2012–2013
- Newsweek's Green Companies 2012
- Center for Political Accountability recognition 2011
- Dow Jones Sustainability North American Index 2010-2012
- Human Rights Campaign Corporation Index 2009-2011
- UK Corporate Adviser Awards – Best Group Risk Provider 2012–2013
- UK Health Insurance Awards – Best Group Risk Provider 2011–2012
- UK Cover Excellence Awards – Best Group Income Protection 2011
- Human Rights Campaign Foundation’s Corporate Equality Index – Best Places to Workfor LGBTQ+ Equality 2022.

== See also ==
- List of United States insurance companies
