= Jardine baronets =

Baronetcy in the Baronetage of the United Kingdom

There have been four baronetcies created for persons with the surname Jardine, one in the Baronetage of Nova Scotia and three in the Baronetage of the United Kingdom.

== Summary ==
The Jardine Baronetcy, of Applegirth in the County of Dumfries, was created in the Baronetage of Nova Scotia on 25 May 1672 for Alexander Jardine, with remainder to his heirs male whatsoever. The seventh Baronet was an influential naturalist. The thirteenth Baronet and (as of 2008) present holder is also the twenty-fourth Chief of Clan Jardine.

The Jardine Baronetcy, of Castle Milk in the County of Dumfries, was created in the Baronetage of the United Kingdom on 20 July 1885. For more information on this creation, see Buchanan-Jardine baronets.

The Jardine Baronetcy, of Godalming in the County of Surrey, was created in the Baronetage of the United Kingdom on 20 January 1916 for John Jardine, Liberal Member of Parliament for Roxburghshire from 1906 to 1919. The third Baronet was a major general in the Royal Artillery and Deputy Governor of Gibraltar. The fourth baronet was a brigadier in the Army.

The Jardine Baronetcy, of Nottingham in the County of Nottingham, was created in the Baronetage of the United Kingdom on 22 May 1919 for Ernest Jardine, Member of Parliament for East Somerset from 1910 to 1918.

== Jardine baronets, of Applegirth (1672) ==
Arms of the Baronets of Applegirth

- Sir Alexander Jardine, 1st Baronet (died c. 1695)
- Sir Alexander Jardine, 2nd Baronet (died 1699)
- Sir John Jardine, 3rd Baronet (1683–1737)
- Sir Alexander Jardine, 4th Baronet (1712–1790)
- Sir William Jardine, 5th Baronet (died 1807)
- Sir Alexander Jardine, 6th Baronet (died 1821)
- Sir William Jardine, 7th Baronet (1800–1874)
- Sir Alexander Jardine, 8th Baronet (1829–1893)
- Sir William Jardine, 9th Baronet (1865–1915)
- Sir Alexander Jardine, 10th Baronet (1868–1942)
- Sir William Edward Jardine, 11th Baronet (1917–1986)
- Sir Alexander Maule Jardine, 12th Baronet (1947–2008)
- Sir William Murray Jardine, 13th Baronet (born 1984)

== Jardine baronets, of Castle Milk (1885) ==
- see Buchanan-Jardine baronets

== Jardine baronets, of Godalming (1916) ==
Escutcheon of the Jardine baronets of Godalming

- Sir John Jardine, 1st Baronet (1844–1919)
- Sir John Eric Birdwood Jardine, 2nd Baronet (1890–1924)
- Sir Colin Arthur Jardine, 3rd Baronet (1892–1957)
- Sir Ian Liddell Jardine, 4th Baronet (1923–1982)
- Sir Andrew Colin Douglas Jardine, 5th Baronet (born 1955)

The heir apparent to the baronetcy is the 5th Baronet's son, Guy Andrew Jardine (born 2004).

== Jardine baronets, of Nottingham (1919) ==
Escutcheon of the Jardine baronets of Nottingham

- Sir Ernest Jardine, 1st Baronet (1859–1947)
- Sir John Jardine, 2nd Baronet (1884–1965)
