= James Jardine (judge) =

English cricketer and barrister

Personal information
- Full name: James Jardine
- Born: 6 June 1846; Dunstable, Bedfordshire, England
- Died: 6 January 1909 (aged 62); St Moritz, Grisons, Switzerland
- Batting: Right-handed

Domestic team information
- Years: Team
- 1870–1874: Marylebone Cricket Club

Career statistics
Competition	First-class
Matches	4
Runs scored	53
Batting average	7.57
100s/50s	–/–
Top score	21
Catches/stumpings	–/–
- Source: Cricinfo, 18 September 2021

James Jardine QC (6 June 1846 – 6 January 1909) was an English first-class cricketer, academic, barrister who served as a judge in British India.

The son of William Jardine, he was born at Dunstable in June 1846. He was educated at Dunstable School, before going up to Caius College, Cambridge. He became a fellow at Caius in 1870. A student of the Inner Temple, he was called to the bar in January 1871. Jardine played first-class cricket for the Marylebone Cricket Club on four occasions between 1870 and 1874, scoring 53 runs with a highest score of 21. Jardine was appointed the Perry Professor of jurisprudence at Bombay University in British India in 1877, where he later served as the dean of the Faculty of Law. He was appointed a judge of the Bombay High Court in January 1886. Jardine died in Switzerland at St Moritz in January 1909, following a short bout of pneumonia.
