= Sir William Murray Jardine, 13th Baronet =

British Baronet

Sir William Murray Jardine is the 13th Baronet of Applegirth, Dumfriesshire. He is the 24th Chief of Clan Jardine. He is also President of the Jardine Clan Society.

Murray Jardine was born on 4 July 1984. He is the son of Sir Alexander Maule Jardine of Applegirth, 12th Bt and Mary Beatrice Cross. He succeeded to the title in 2008.

== See also ==
- Jardine baronets

Baronetage of Nova Scotia
Preceded by Alexander Maule Jardine	Baronet (of Applegirth); 2008–present	Incumbent
