= Robert Jardine (surgeon) =

Canadian surgeon (1862–1932)

Prof Robert Jardine FRSE FRCPSG (1862–1932) was a Nova Scotian who came to fame in Scotland as Professor of Midwifery at St Mungo's College in Glasgow.

== Life ==
He was born in Jardineville on the Richibucto River in New Brunswick on 30 January 1862 the son of Thomas Jardine, shipbuilder, nephew of the founder of the town (in 1816), John Jardine. He attended Mount Allison College in New Brunswick then travelled to Scotland to finish his medical studies at the University of Edinburgh, graduating with an MD in 1889.

He set up private practice in Glasgow around 1890 at 3 Houldsworth Street and was living at 5 Clifton Terrace (now demolished). By 1910 he was living at 20 Royal Crescent in a Georgian terraced house in the Kelvingrove district. He also operated at Glasgow Royal Infirmary and lectured at its educational branch St Mungo's College. In 1901 he was elected a Fellow of the Royal Society of Edinburgh. His proposers were Alexander Russell Simpson Sir William Turner, Alexander Crum Brown, and John McLaren, Lord McLaren.

He died in Glasgow on 17 December 1932.

== Family ==
In 1889 he married May Barbara Brymer.
