= James Jardine (cricketer, born 1794) =

English cricketer

James Jardine (29 January 1794 – 13 January 1872) was an English cricketer with amateur status. He was associated with Kent and made his debut in 1827. He was a contractor by profession, his family being connected with the railways.

== Bibliography ==
- Carlaw, Derek (2020). Kent County Cricketers, A to Z: Part One (1806–1914) (PDF). Cardiff: ACS.
- Haygarth, Arthur (1996) [1862]. Scores & Biographies, Volume 1 (1744–1826). Kennington: Frederick Lillywhite. ISBN 978-19-00592-23-9.
- Haygarth, Arthur (1997) [1862]. Scores & Biographies, Volume 2 (1827–1840). Kennington: Frederick Lillywhite. ISBN 978-19-00592-23-9.
