= Robert Jardine (railway promoter) =

Scottish-Canadian businessman (1812–1866)

- Born: 12 January 1812
- Died: 16 June 1866 (aged 54)
- Occupations: businessman railroad promoter

Robert Jardine (12 January 1812 – 16 June 1866) was a Scottish-Canadian businessman and railroad promoter in Saint John, New Brunswick, Canada.

== Biography ==
He was born 12 January 1812 to Alexander Jardine, a mason, and Helen Davidson Girvan, Ayrshire, Scotland. Jardine emigrated to Canada in the 1830s, sailing from Ayr to St. John, New Brunswick, and was soon employed by grocer Barnabas Tilton. His younger brother, Alexander, joined him in St. John, and the pair bought Tilton's business, entering into partnership as Jardine & Co., which grew into a significant import business.

At the same time he was involved in a number of high-profile businesses and organizations in Saint John, and served as chairman of the European and North American Railway Commission. In 1854 there was a cholera epidemic and he was president of the Saint John Water Company at the time. He established a pure water system that earned him a civic commendation. The system proved its worth for decades.

Jardine was the chairman of commissioners for railways in New Brunswick, from 1857 until 1865.

== Legacy ==
The family business remains notable by its large imprint of Jardine., etched in the bricks of its original Prince William Street location, visible on its Water Street side, as well as Jardine Alley, newly illuminated in 2022.

He was survived by four daughters, including Helen (died March 1909), wed to banker Thomas Maclellan, later president of Provident Life and Accident Insurance Company (later UNUM), their son, Jardine's grandson, Robert "R.J." Jardine Maclellan (26 March 1874 - 7 June 1956), assumed the company presidency following the sudden death of his father, when struck by a motor vehicle in 1916. R.J. founded the Maclellan Foundation in 1945 with his sister, Dora, and his son Bob. .
