= Sir John Jardine, 1st Baronet =

British Liberal politician and colonial civil servant

John Jardine

Sir John Jardine, 1st Baronet, KCIE (27 September 1844 – 26 April 1919) was a British Liberal Party politician and colonial civil servant in India.

== Biography ==
=== Early life and career in India ===
Jardine was the son of William Jardine of Bedford (but originally of Dumfriesshire, Scotland) and was educated at Christ's College, Cambridge, where he won the Chancellor's Gold Medal for English Verse in 1864.

He joined the Bombay Civil Service in 1864, and was Political Officer in Native States of Kattywar in 1871, Secretary for the trial of the Gaekwar of Baroda in 1875, Secretary to Treaty with Portugal and Law Officer to Government of India in 1877; Judicial Commissioner of Burma in 1878, President of the Burma School Board in 1881, and Chief Secretary to Bombay Government, holding the Political, Secret, Educational, Persian, and Judicial portfolios in 1885.

Jardine was elected Fellow of the University of Bombay in 1872, and was sometime the University's Dean of Arts and Dean of Law. In 1895 he was appointed its Vice-Chancellor. He was also president of the Bombay Branch of the Royal Asiatic Society from 1895 until his retirement, having been elected to its membership in 1878.

Jardine was appointed a Judge of the Bombay High Court in 1885;, serving as acting Chief Justice in 1895. He retired from Indian service in 1897 and returned to the United Kingdom. He was appointed a Knight Commander of the Order of the Indian Empire (KCIE) in the 1897 Diamond Jubilee Honours.

=== Political career ===
On his return to the United Kingdom, Jardine unsuccessfully contested Roxburghshire as a Liberal in 1900, before being elected to the seat in 1906, serving until 1918. He was made a Baronet of Godalming on 20 January 1916.

He was a businessman on the world stage. For instance in 1901 he gave his address as 34 Lancaster Gate, Middlesex (the heart of London) and was funding railway building in North Borneo. He was one of the many Jardine Baronets.

== Personal life ==
Jardine married Minnie Dunbar Hogg, the daughter of Jabez Hogg, and was succeeded in turn by his sons, Sir John Eric Birdwood Jardine, 2nd Baronet and Sir Colin Arthur Jardine, 3rd Baronet.

Sir John Jardine, 1st Baronet, died in 1919.

== Election results ==
General election 1900: Roxburghshire
Party	Candidate	Votes	%	±%
Conservative	Earl of Dalkeith	2,682		
Liberal	John Jardine	2,323		

General election 1906: Roxburghshire
Party	Candidate	Votes	%	±%
Liberal	John Jardine	2,829	52.9	
Conservative	Sir Richard John Waldie-Griffith	2,514	47.1	

General election Jan 1910: Roxburghshire
Party	Candidate	Votes	%	±%
Liberal	John Jardine	2,943		
Conservative	Lord Henry Francis Montagu-Douglas-Scott	2,626		

General election Dec 1910: Roxburghshire
Party	Candidate	Votes	%	±%
Liberal	John Jardine	2,908		
Conservative	Neil James Kennedy Cochran-Patrick	2,704		

Parliament of the United Kingdom
Preceded by The Earl of Dalkeith	Member of Parliament for Roxburghshire; 1906 – 1918	Constituency abolished
Baronetage of the United Kingdom
New creation	Baronet (of Godalming); 1916–1919	Succeeded by John Jardine
