= David Jardine Jardine =

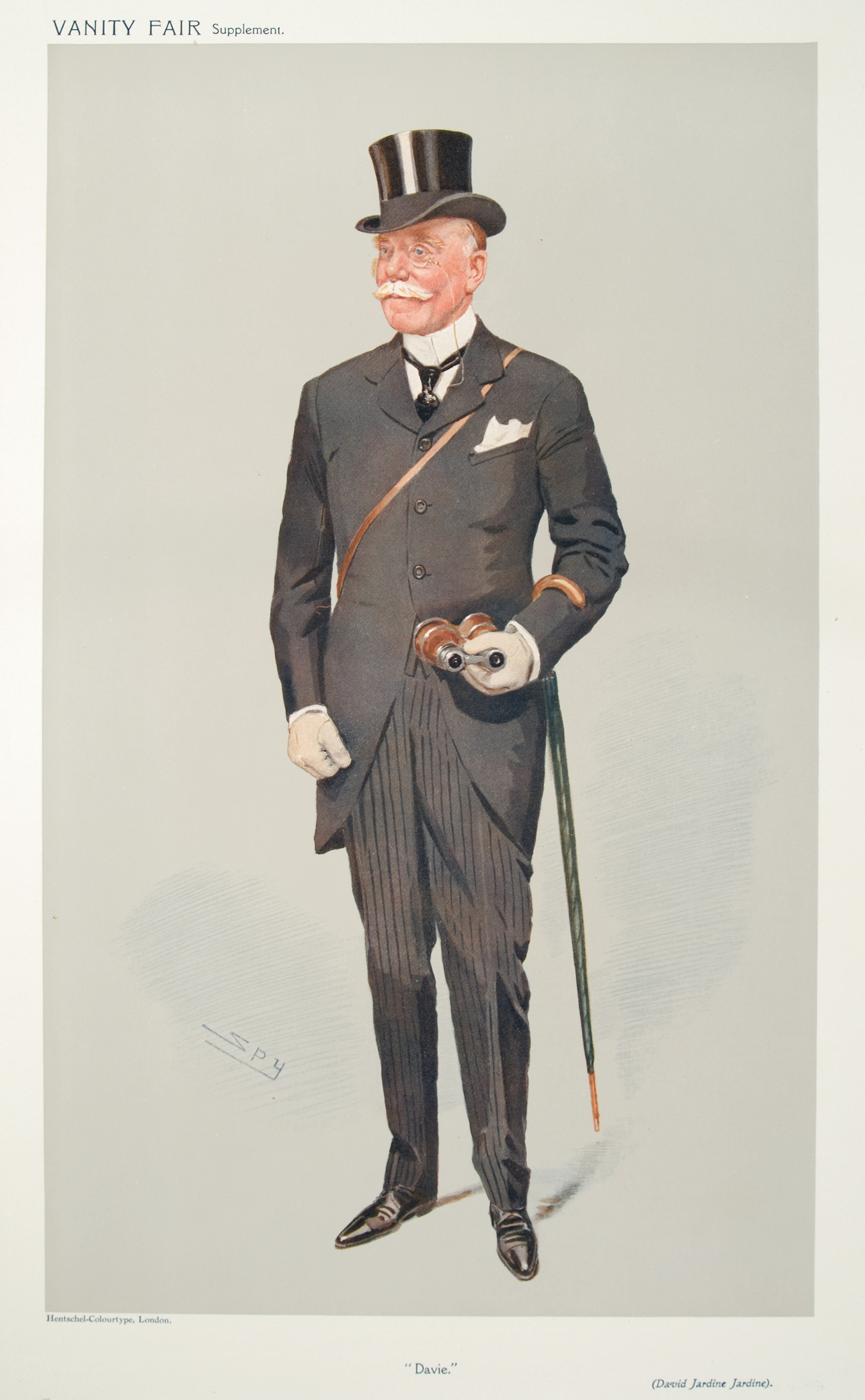
"Davie" David Jardine Jardine as caricatured by Spy in Vanity Fair, April 1908

David Jardine Jardine FRGS (4 August 1847, in Tinwald, Dumfries – 23 August 1922, in Lockerbie) was a barrister, landowner, big-game hunter, and owner of racehorses.

After education at the Edinburgh Academy from 1859 to 1864, David Jardine matriculated in 1867 at Trinity College, Cambridge, graduating there B.A. in 1872 and M.A. in 1875. He was in 1871 admitted to the Inner Temple and in 1874 called to the Bar, practising law on the South Eastern Circuit. After leaving the University of Cambridge, he travelled in India, Java, China, Japan, Australia, New Zealand, Tasmania, the United States, Canada, Egypt, and South Africa. He spent four years in India shooting big game. He served as Justice of the Peace in Dumfriesshire. As a racehorse owner, he won the Royal Hunt Cup at Ascot with "Refractor" in 1899 and the Northumberland Plate with "Sir Harry" in 1909.

In 1886 Jardine married Mary Angela Bright, a daughter of Sir Charles Tilston Bright. The marriage produced a son and a daughter.
