= Sai Wan War Cemetery =

CWGC cemetery in Hong Kong

- Commonwealth War Graves Commission
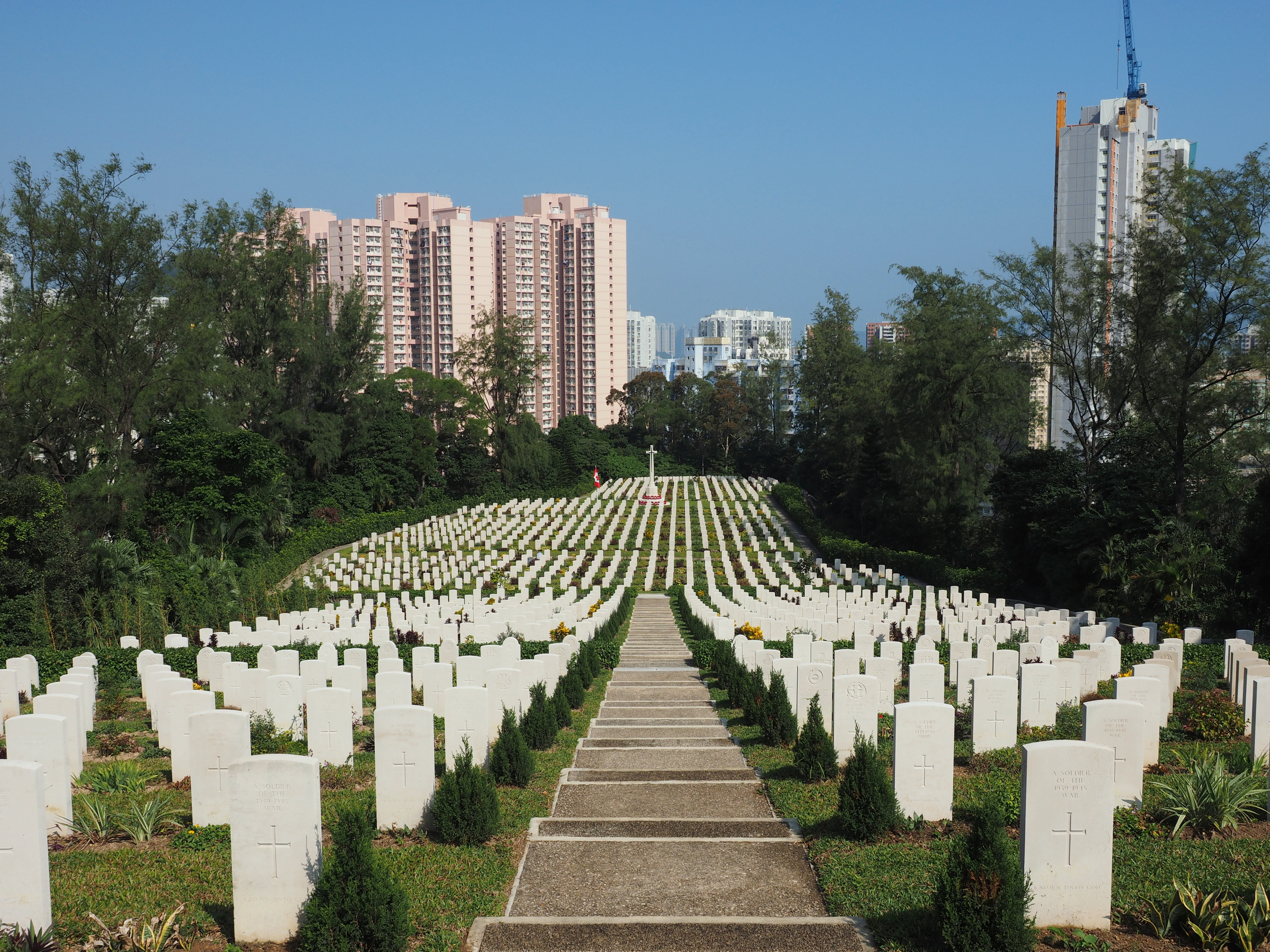
- Sai Wan War Cemetery in Hong Kong
- For Battle of Hong Kong
- Unveiled: 1946; 80 years ago
- Location: 22°15′34″N 114°14′04″E near Chai Wan, Hong Kong
- Designed by: Colin St Clair Oakes
- Total burials: 1,528
- Unknowns: 444
- Commemorated: 2,072

Burials by war
- World War I: 12; World War II: 1,528

Sai Wan War Cemetery
- Traditional Chinese: 西灣國殤紀念墳場
- Simplified Chinese: 西湾国殇纪念坟场
Transcriptions
Standard Mandarin
- Hanyu Pinyin: Xīwān Guóshāng Jìniàn Fénchǎng
Yue: Cantonese
- Jyutping: sai1 waan1 gwok3 soeng1 gei2 nim6 fan4 coeng4

Sai Wan War Cemetery is a military cemetery located in Chai Wan, Hong Kong which was built in 1946. The cemetery was created to commemorate soldiers of Hong Kong Garrison who perished during the Second World War. The cemetery also contains 12 World War I burials. A total of 1,528 soldiers, mainly from the Commonwealth, are commemorated here. Most of the remaining burials are located at the Stanley Military Cemetery.

== Background ==
On 8 December 1941 – less than eight hours after the attack on Pearl Harbor – Japanese forces launched an invasion into Hong Kong, then a British Crown colony. The invasion started a lesser-known chapter of World War II when Allied forces – mainly British, Canadian, Australian and Indian – began the futile defence of British Hong Kong. Records now show that the territory had been deemed militarily undefendable by the War Office. Even so, the garrison was ordered to put up a robust resistance and six infantry battalions were tasked with the defence of Hong Kong. Several locations including Shing Mun Redoubt along the Gin Drinkers Line, Wong Nai Chung Gap, Mount Butler, shores bordering Lye Moon Passage, Devil's Peak and Stanley Fort saw fierce combat which resulted in overwhelming casualties among Allied Troops.

The Japanese forces from Shenzhen easily crossed the Sham Chun River, and entered into the territory through the Mainland in the north. The three British Army battalions manning the Gin Drinkers Line were the 2nd Battalion, Royal Scots to the west, the 2/14th Battalion, Punjab Regiment in the centre and the 5/7th Battalion, Rajput Regiment to the east.

The 5/7 Rajput of the Indian Army bore the heaviest casualty losses amongst all defending combatant battalions engaged in the Battle of Hong Kong: 156 killed in action or died from wounds, 113 missing, and 193 wounded.

The 2/14 Punjab of the Indian Army also bore heavy losses: 55 killed in action or died from wounds, 69 missing, and 161 wounded.

Hong Kong and Singapore Royal Artillery, which was raised with troops recruited from Undivided India, also suffered heavy casualties during the Battle of Hong Kong and are commemorated with names inscribed on panels at the entrance to Sai Wan War Cemetery: 144 killed, 45 missing and 103 wounded.

Intense battles were fought on Hong Kong Island until the British surrendered the territory at the end of the month on Christmas Day. The surrender marked the beginning of the Japanese occupation of the territory and would last until the Japanese unconditionally surrendered three years later.

Casualties were heavy among defending forces during the battle, but many more succumbed to disease, drowning, maltreatment, or execution during their long captivity in Hong Kong and Japan, and transportation between the two.

The majority of the fallen Allied soldiers from the campaign, including British, Canadian and Indian soldiers were eventually interred at the Sai Wan Military Cemetery. A total of 1,528 soldiers, mainly from the Commonwealth, are commemorated here. Most of the remaining burials are located at the Stanley Military Cemetery.

According to the Commonwealth War Graves Commission (CWGC), the commemorative graves/plaques of 914 soldiers from Undivided India are grouped in 3 memorial locations within the Sai Wan cemetery complex : 104 Indian soldiers whose tombstones are located on the slopes of Sai Wan Cemetery, 287 more Indian soldiers interred at Sai Wan Memorial while a further 118 Indian soldiers whose remains were cremated according to their religious customs are inscribed on commemorative plaques at the Sai Wan Cremation Memorial. The Sai Wan War Cemetery contains the graves of 228 Canadians.

== Location ==
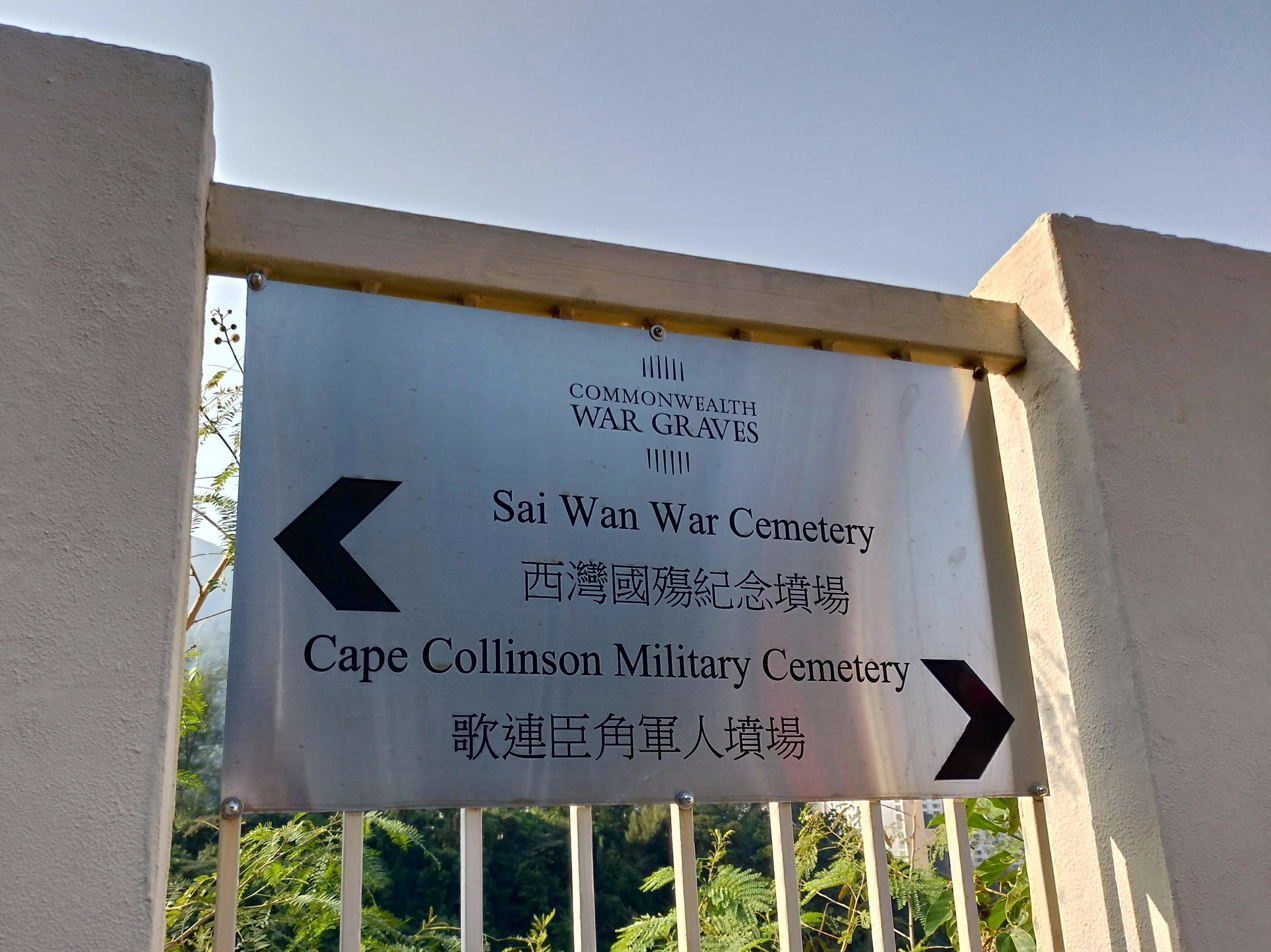
The direction sign of Sai Wan War Cemetery and Cape Collinson Military Cemetery at Cape Collinson Road

The cemetery is located on the western slope of Pottinger Peak at the north-eastern corner of Hong Kong Island. The site of the cemetery is situated midway up on the north side of Mount Collinson on Cape Collinson Road. The site gradually slopes down towards the sea which used to provide views of the harbour narrow at Lei Yue Mun. Lei Yue Mun was where the Japanese had crossed the harbour on the evening of 18 December and landed on Hong Kong Island. That same night 20 gunners at the Sai Wan Battery were massacred.

Today, the view of the harbour is obstructed by residential high rises in Chai Wan, and only on a clear day Kowloon would be visible across the harbour. The area also has a few other cemeteries. The Holy Cross Roman Catholic Cemetery; Hong Kong Military Cemetery; and the Cape Collinson Muslim and Buddhist Cemeteries are within walking distance from one another. Further east just a few hundred meters away on the side of Pottinger Peak is the larger Cape Collinson Chinese Permanent Cemetery.

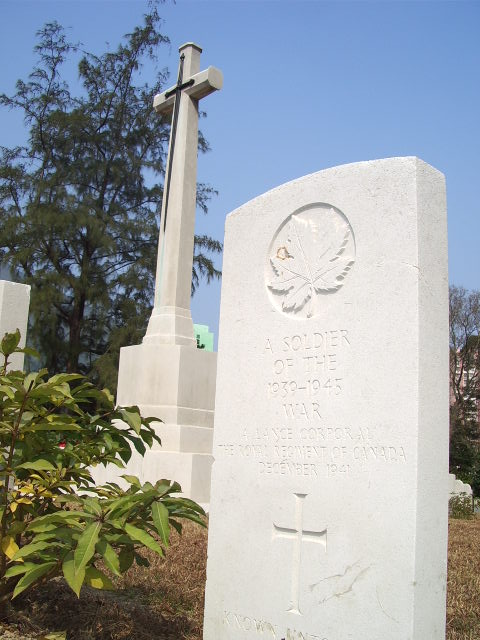
One of 444 unidentified burials at the cemetery, of which 118 are from Undivided India and 107 are Canadian. This headstone has been inscribed in error (it is actually for a soldier from the Royal Rifles of Canada, not the Royal Regiment of Canada).

== The cemetery ==
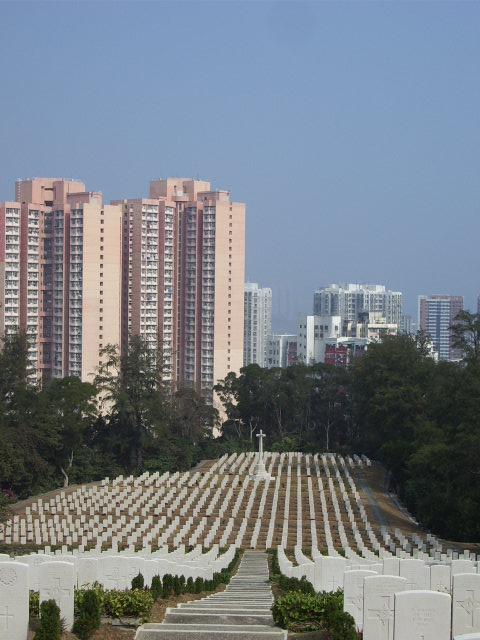
Layout of Sai Wan War Cemetery

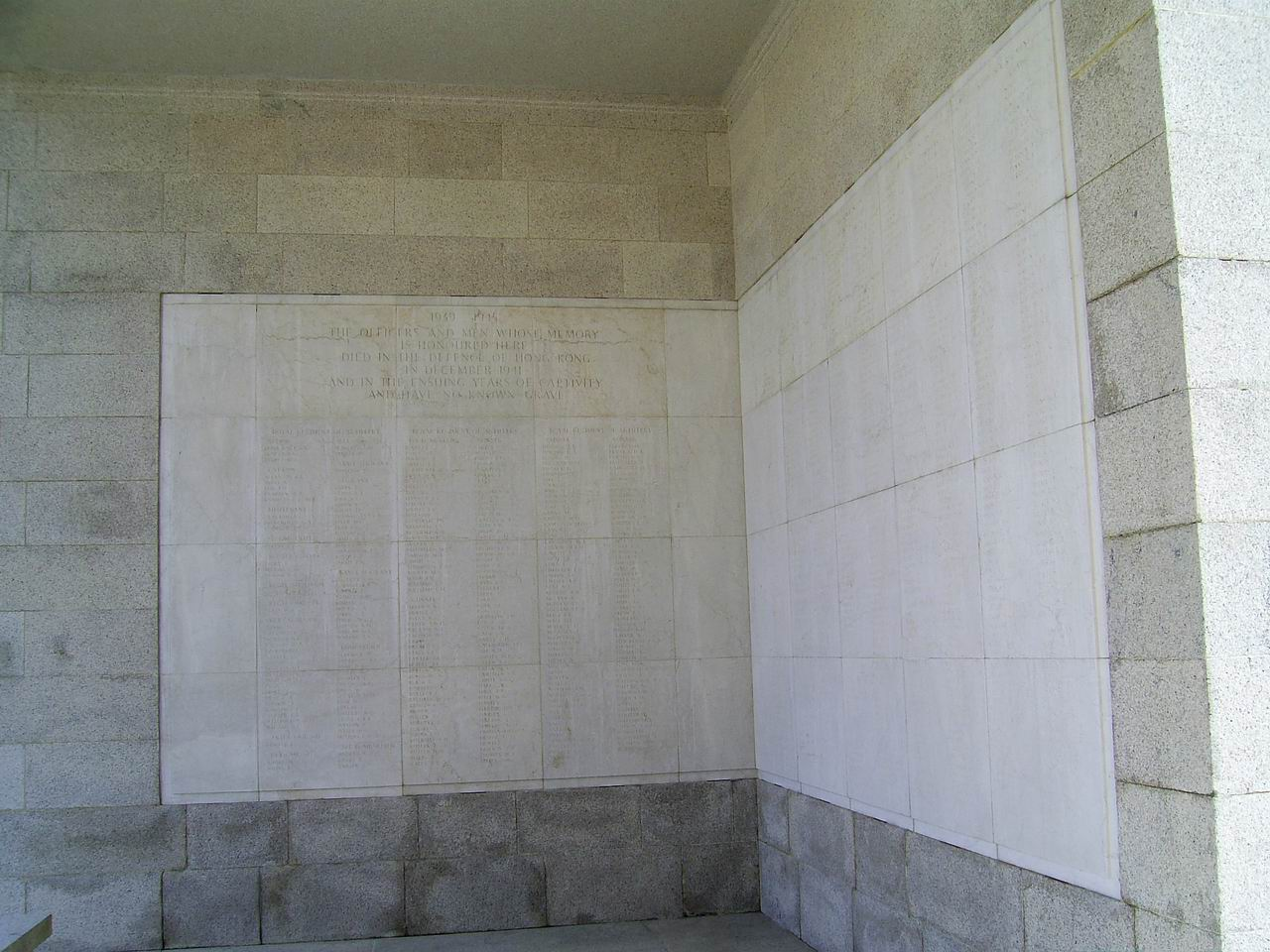
Memorial panels at Sai Wan War Cemetery

The cemetery was built in 1946. It is now one of the many maintained by the Commonwealth War Graves Commission since the land has been leased since 1953. A memorial hall the entrance into the cemetery bears panels with the names of more than 2,000 Commonwealth servicemen who died in the Battle of Hong Kong or subsequently in captivity and those who have no known grave. Additional panels form the cremation memorial bearing the names of 144 British Indian Army casualties whose remains were cremated in accordance with their faith. Also, the Sai Wan (China) Memorial commemorating 72 casualties of both World Wars whose graves in mainland China could not be maintained can be found at the memorial hall. Twenty local soldiers and eight civilians are also buried here. A plaque displaying the battle and army advances gives visitors the insight into the extent of the campaign.

The physical layout of the cemetery on the slope of Mount Collinsion has British graves at the top most level, Canadian and Dutch graves in the middle and the graves of soldiers from Undivided India at the lower portion of the slope. Recently relocated graves of soldiers from Undivided India who died in World War II have been moved from cemeteries in Kowloon to the bottom edge of Sai Wan War Cemetery.

The war graves are marked with white upright granite headstones depicting the appropriate regiment or service's insignia. The cemetery is enclosed within a wall of flowering shrubs and bushes. Storm-water drainage ditches run along the two sides of the cemetery from top to bottom. An Altar of Remembrance, bearing the words from Sirach: "Their name liveth for evermore" marks the top of the flight of stone steps leading down a center aisle towards the Cross of Sacrifice. Both the cemetery and memorial were designed by Colin St Clair Oakes.

Other than those died in defence of Hong Kong, the remains of POWs who died in Taiwan were brought to Sai Wan for burial as well. There are now 1,528 casualties of World War II buried or commemorated at Sai Wan War Cemetery, 444 of the burials are unidentified. The unidentified were marked with the words: Known Unto God. In addition, there are special memorials to 16 World War II casualties buried in a Kowloon Muslim cemetery whose graves were lost. There are also 77 war graves of other nationalities from this period, the majority of them Dutch. The cemetery also contains special memorials to 12 World War I and 28 World War II graves which were earlier in two Muslim cemeteries (Number 3 Muslim Cemetery at Ho Man Tin and Mohammeden Cemetery at Ta Sek Ku near Mong Kok) whose graves have since been lost due to urban redevelopment.

== Notable graves ==
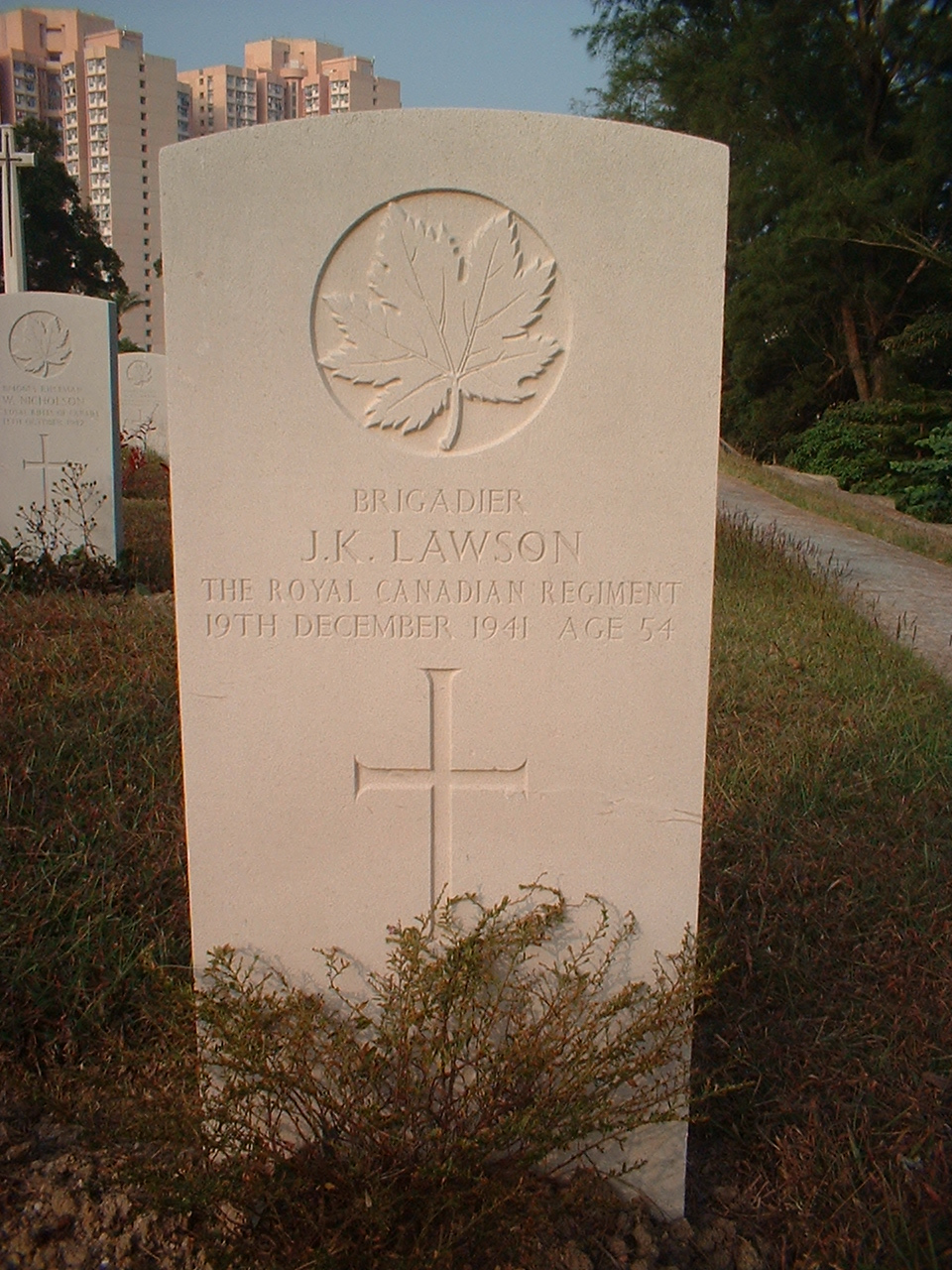
The headstone of Brigadier J.K. Lawson

About 280 servicemen were from Canada, including Brigadier John K. Lawson. Lawson was the highest-ranking officer to be killed in action during the defence of Hong Kong, his remains were originally buried by the Japanese at Wong Nai Chung Gap during the occupation but were reburied at the cemetery. Another of two Major General Lancelot Ernest Dennys and Merton Beckwith-Smith were also buried in this cemetery.

Company Sergeant-Major John Robert Osborn, recipient of a Victoria Cross awarded for the defence of Hong Kong, has no grave at this cemetery, but his name is engraved on the memorial hall.

== Gallery ==
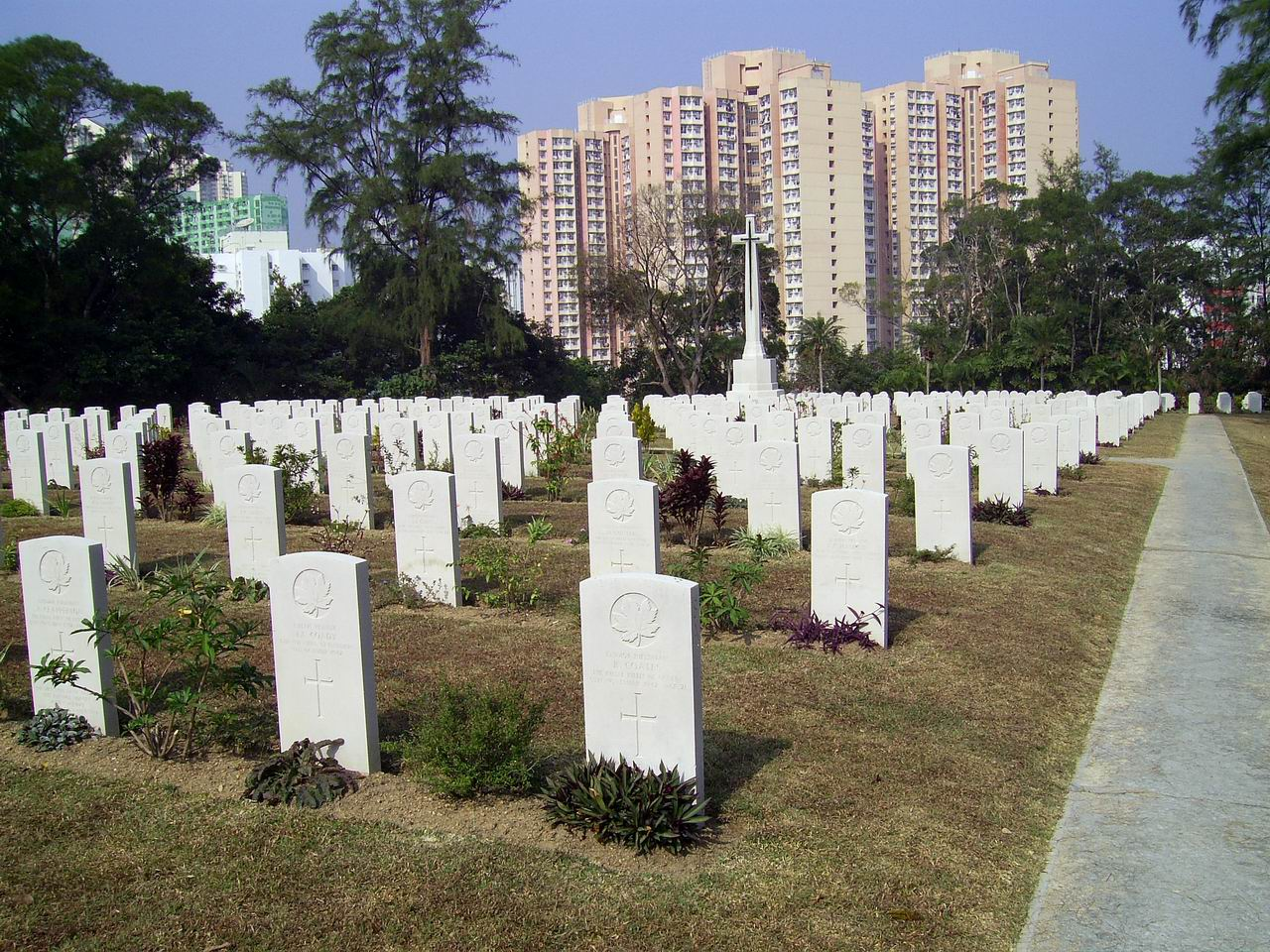
Headstones of Canadian soldiers at Sai Wan War Cemetery

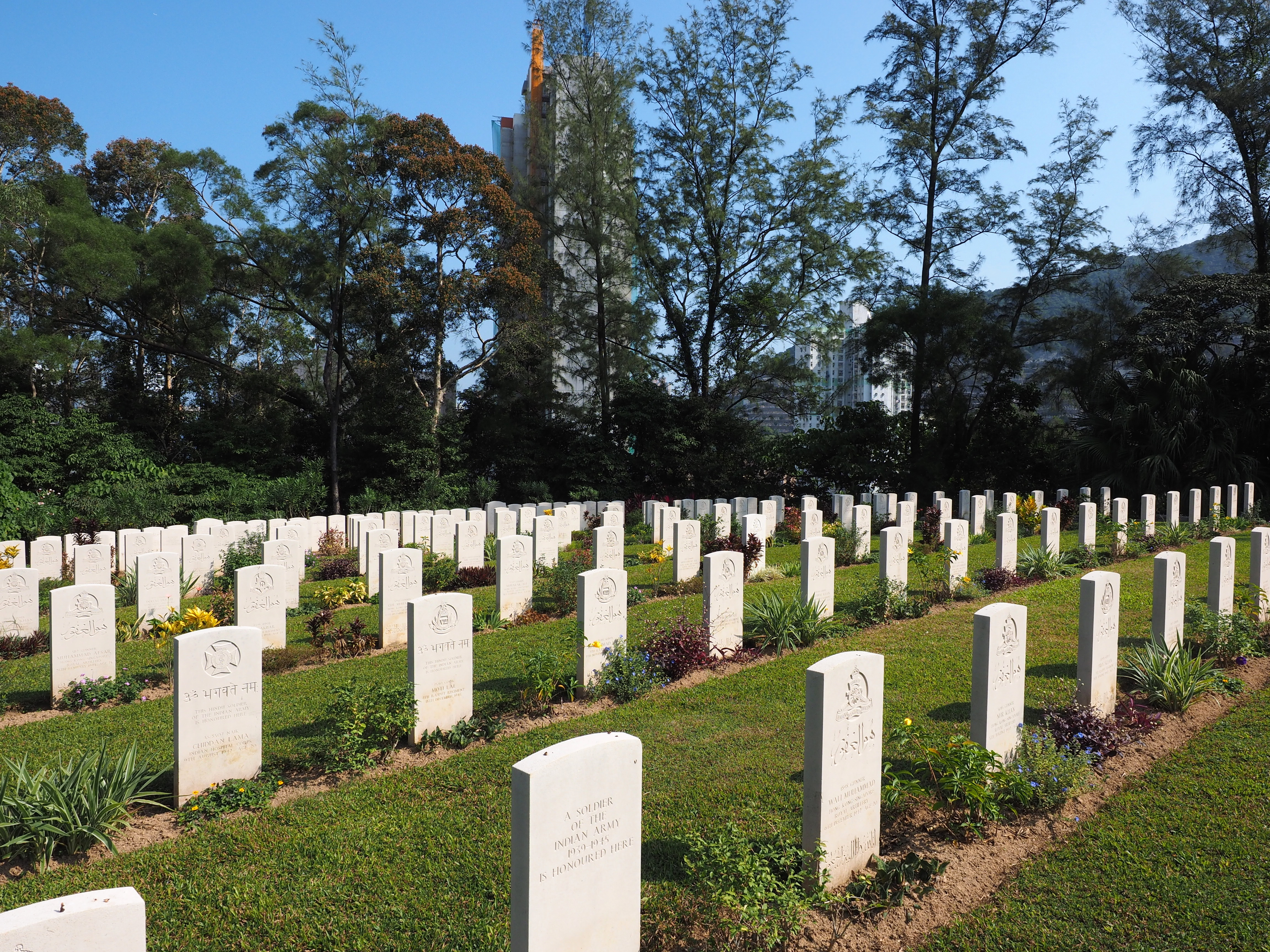
Headstones of Indian soldiers at Sai Wan War Cemetery

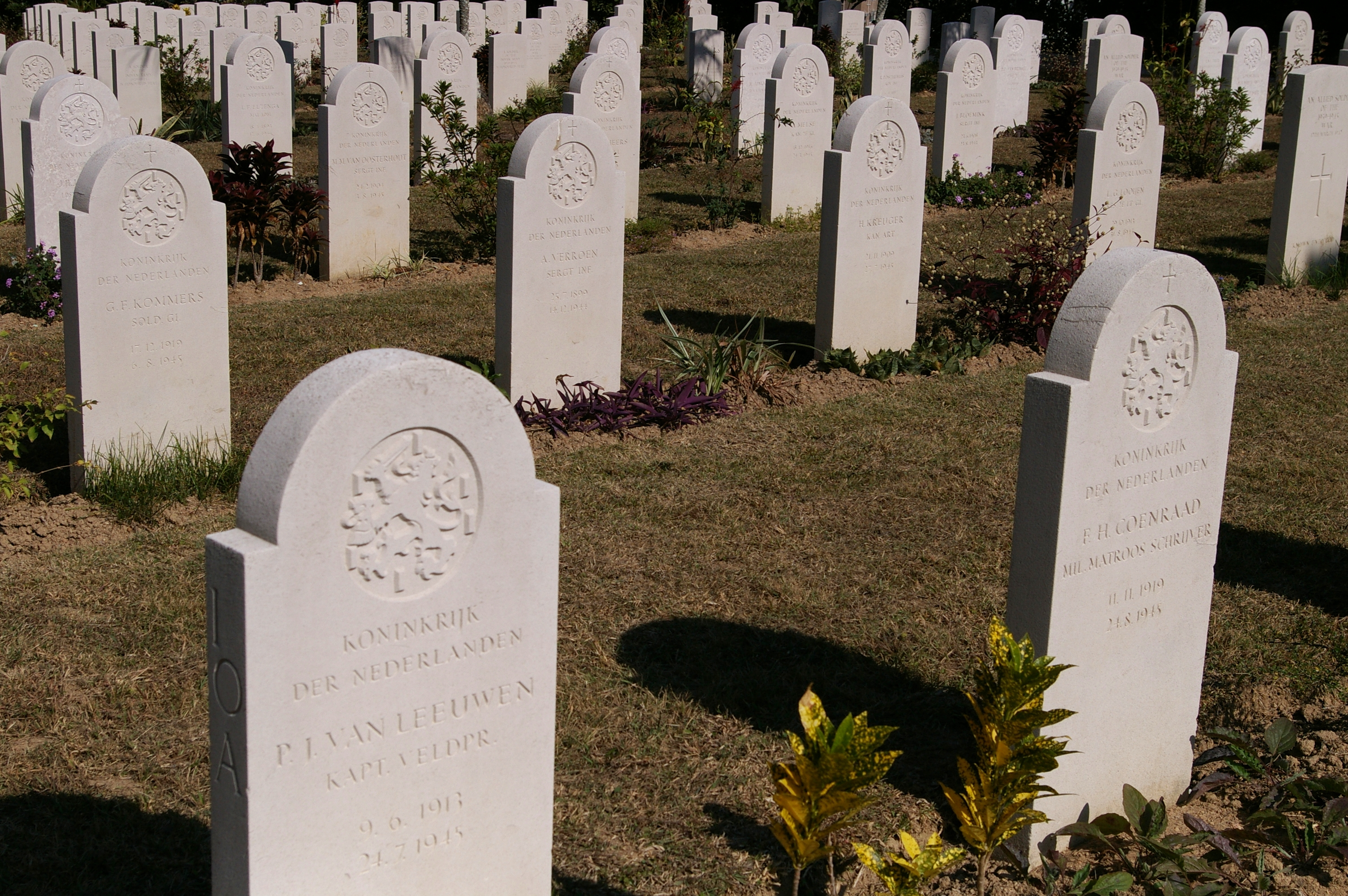
Headstones of Dutch soldiers at Sai Wan War Cemetery

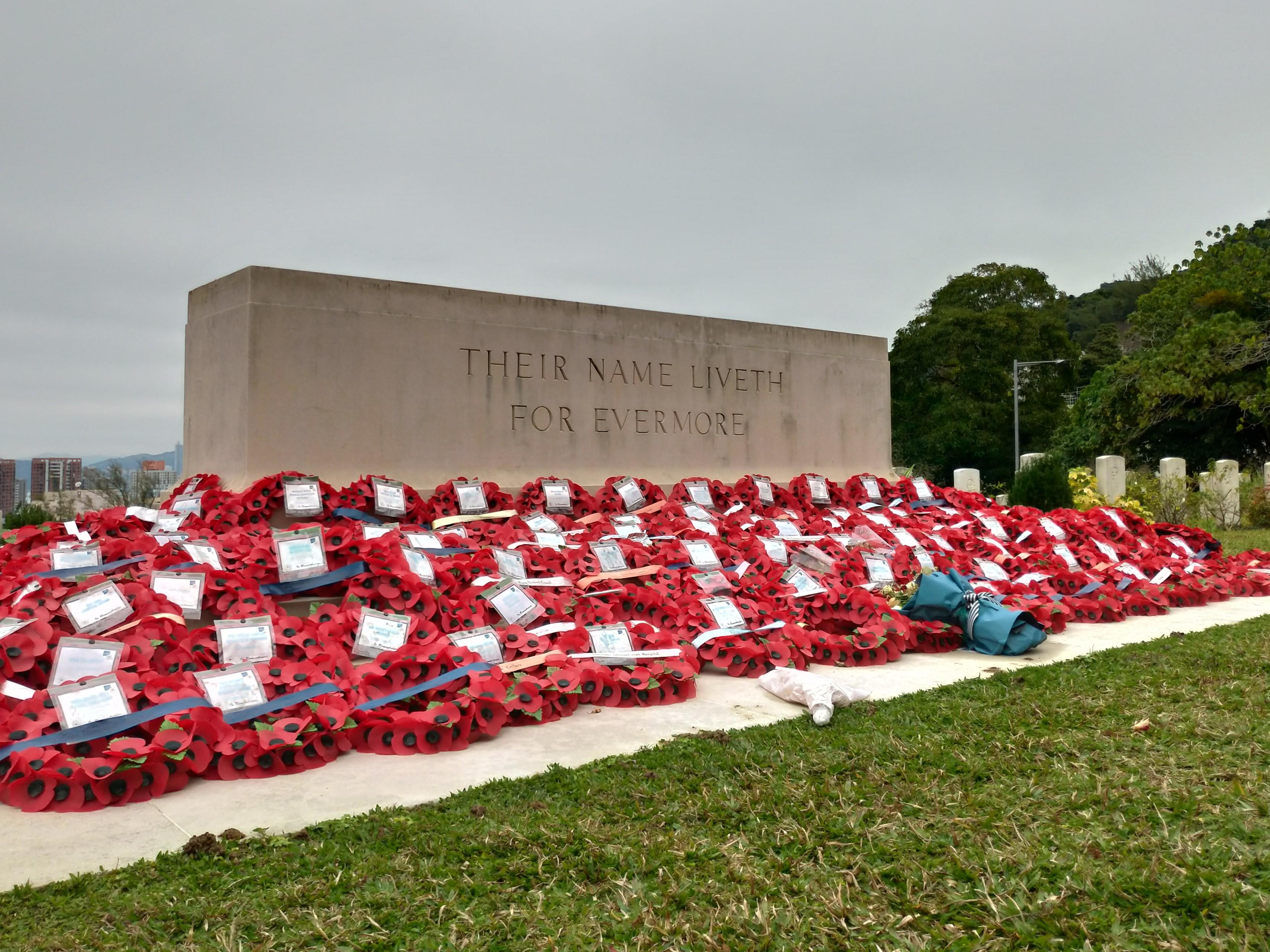
Stone of Remembrance at Sai Wan War Cemetery

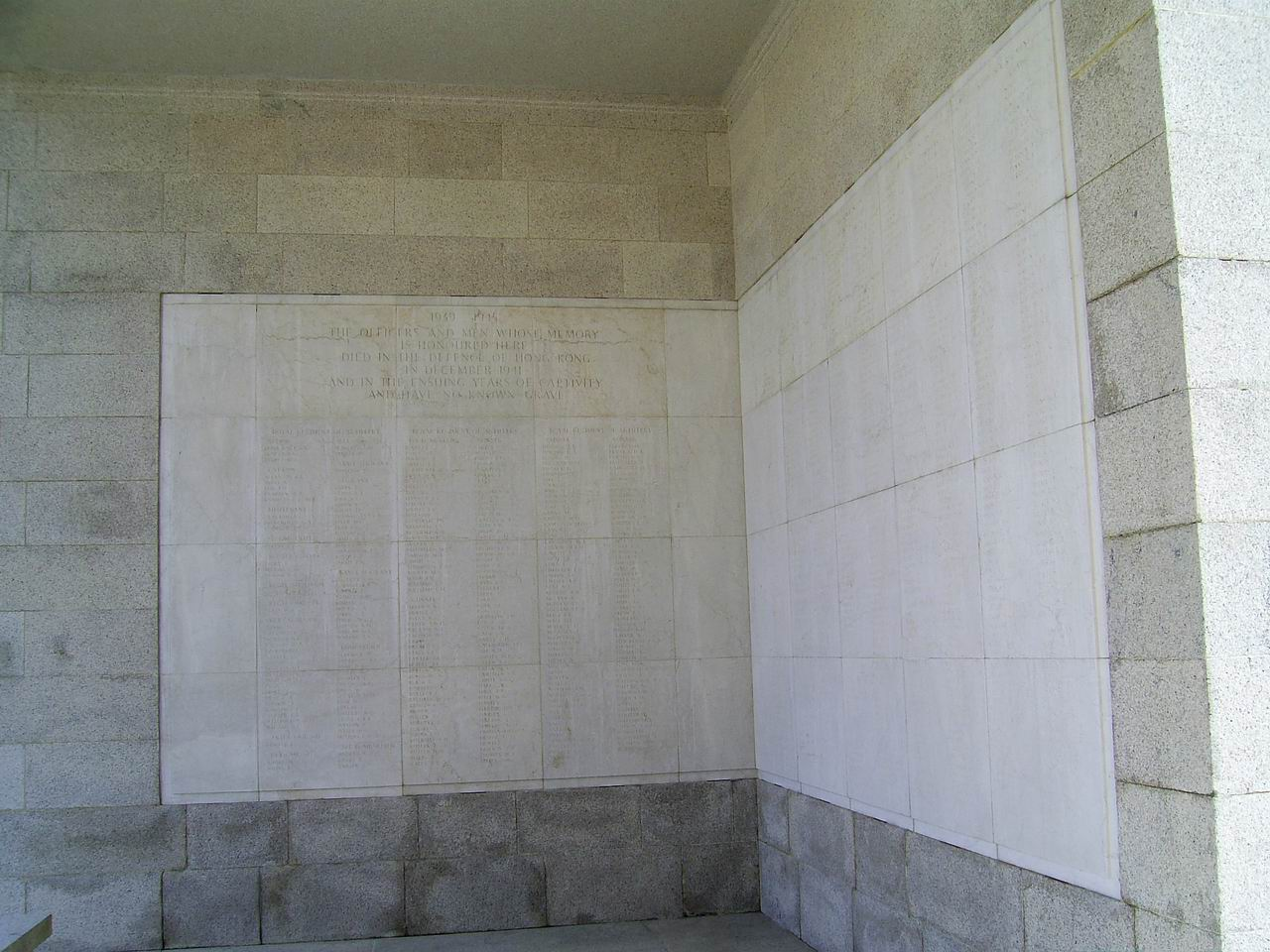
Sai Wan War Cemetery Memorial Panels

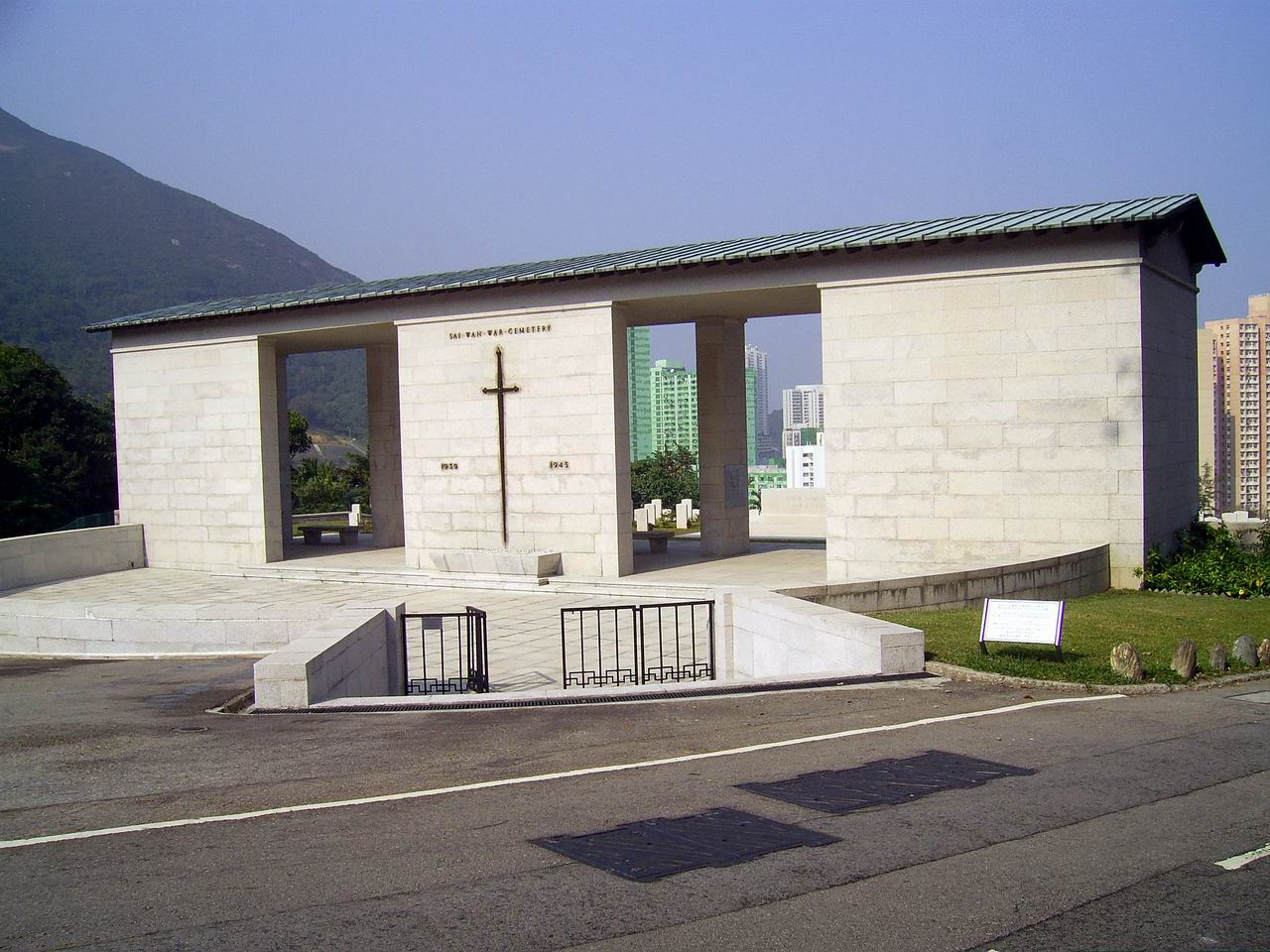
Sai Wan War Cemetery

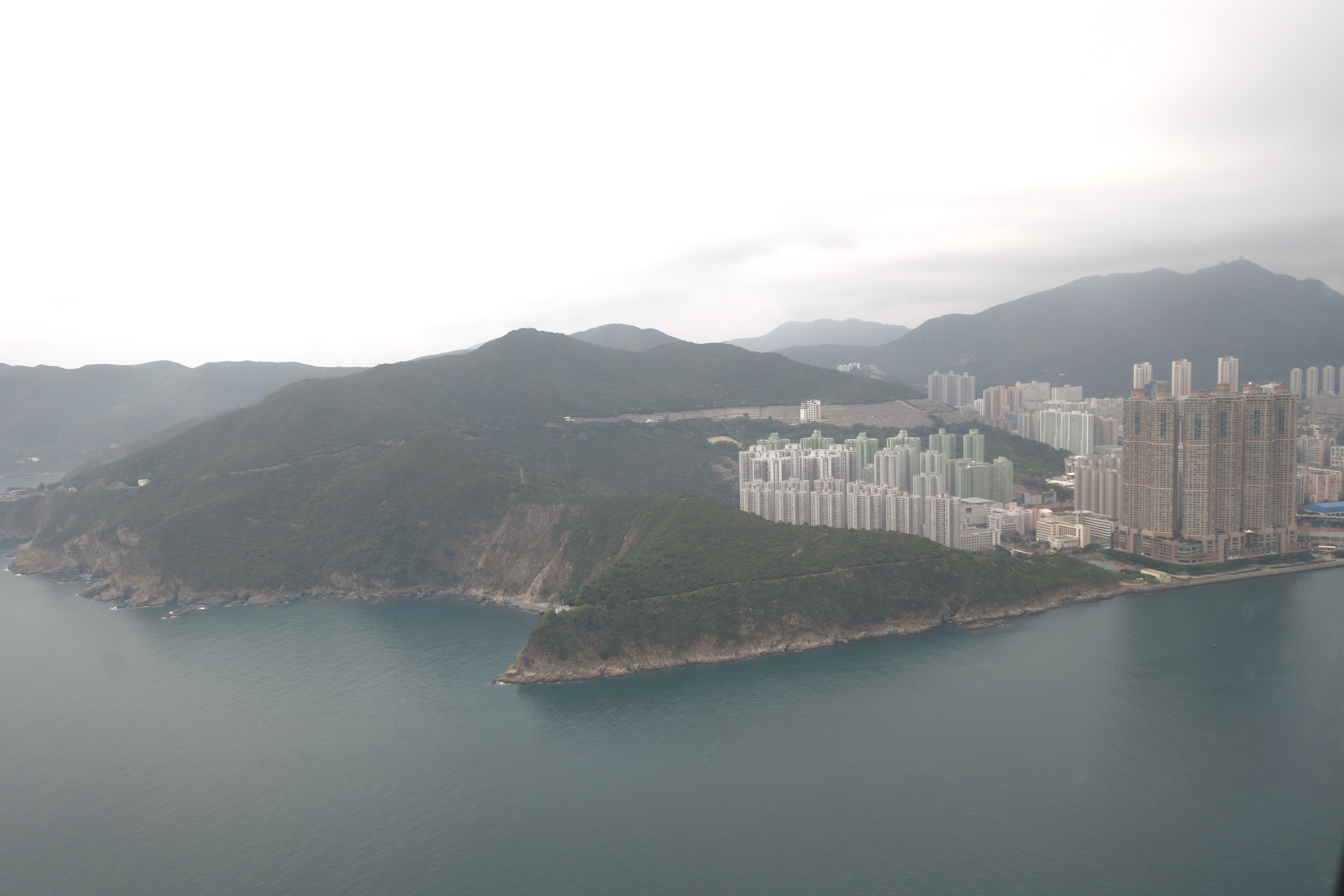
Aerial view of Cape Collinson, Siu Sai Wan and western slope of Pottinger Peak

== See also ==
- Stanley Military Cemetery
- List of cemeteries in Hong Kong
