= Cape Collinson Chinese Permanent Cemetery =

Cemetery in Hong Kong

Coordinates: 22.26°N 114.24°E

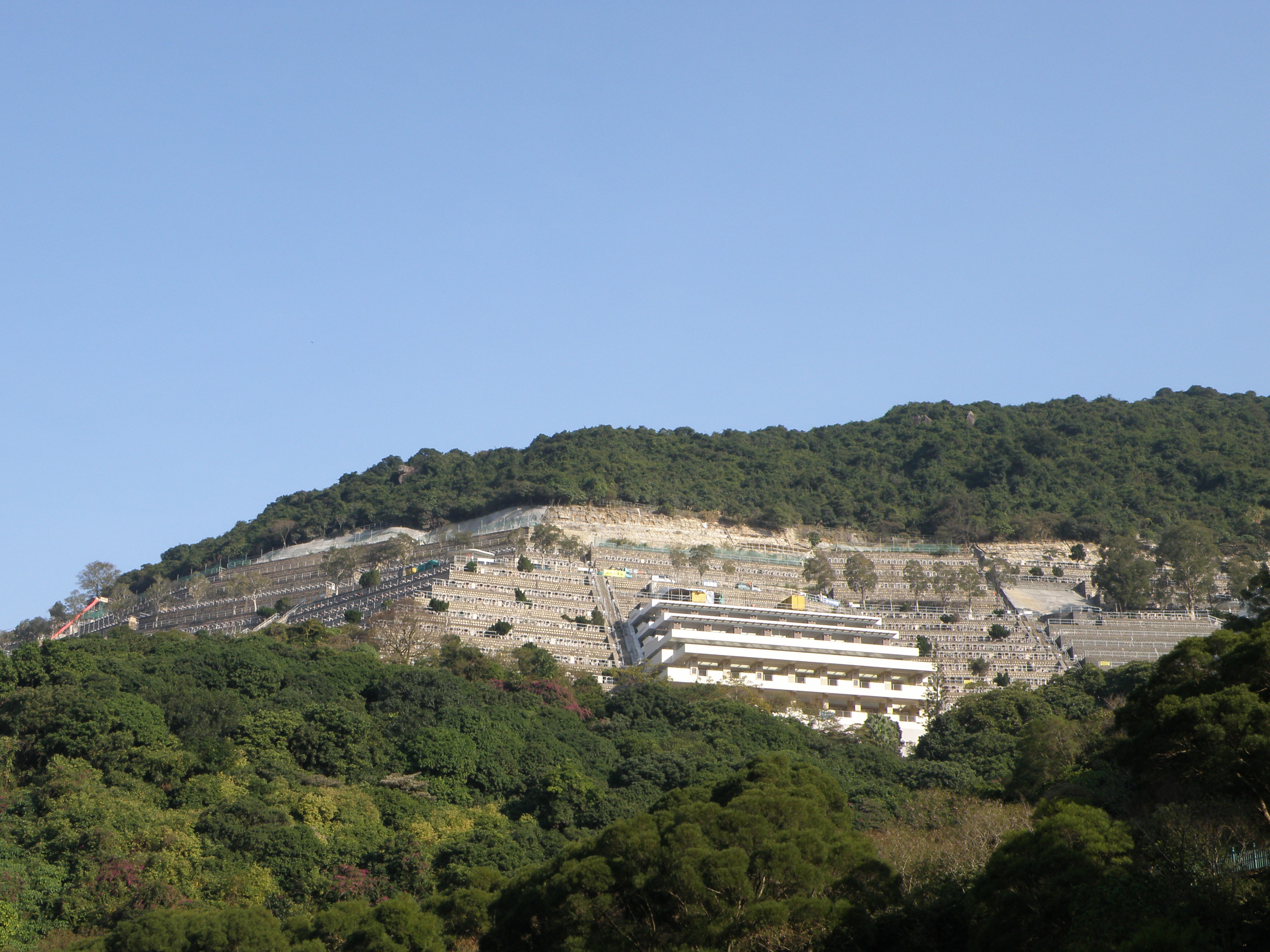
Cape Collinson Chinese Permanent Cemetery.

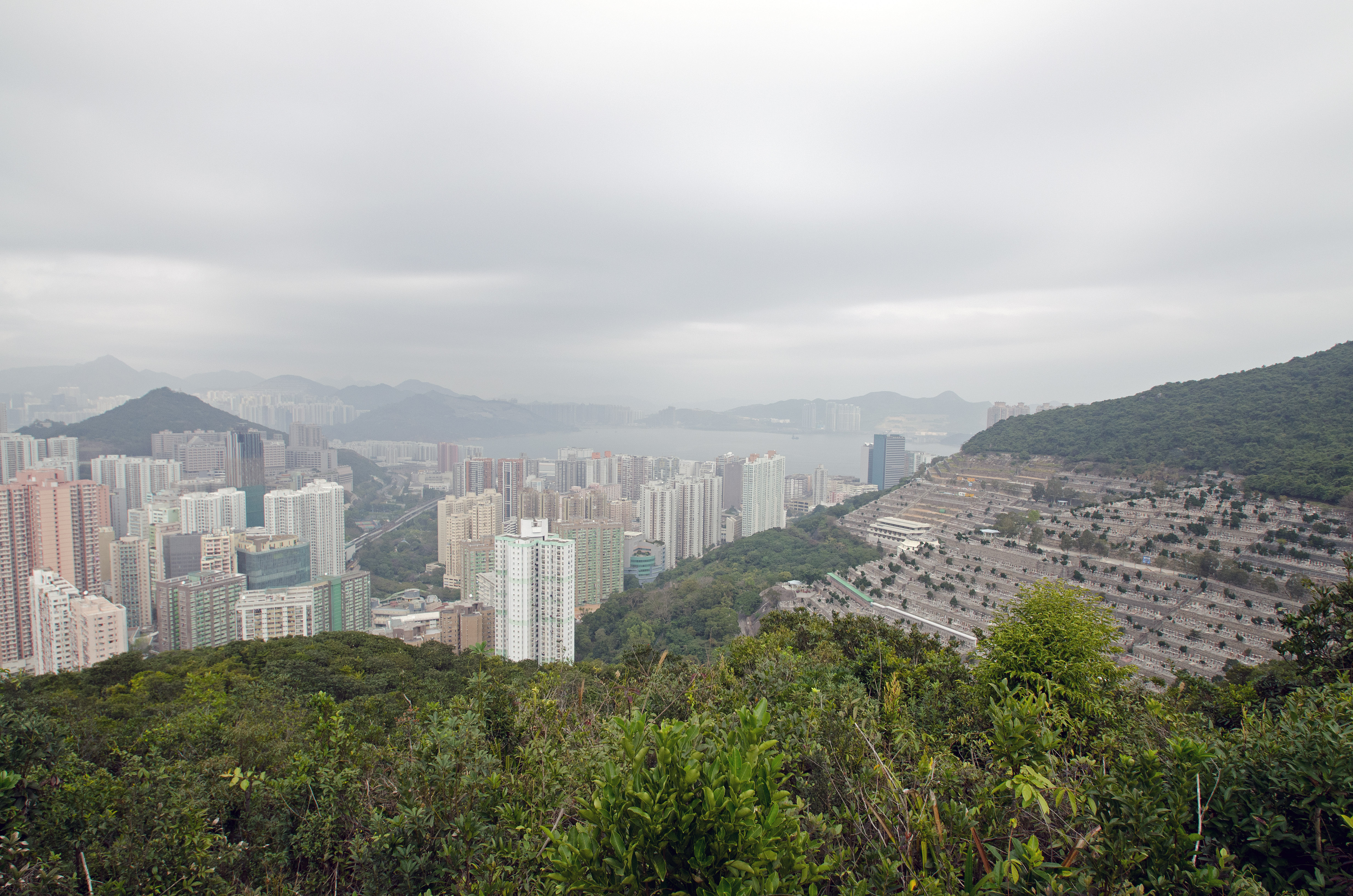
View of Chai Wan and Cape Collinson Chinese Permanent Cemetery.

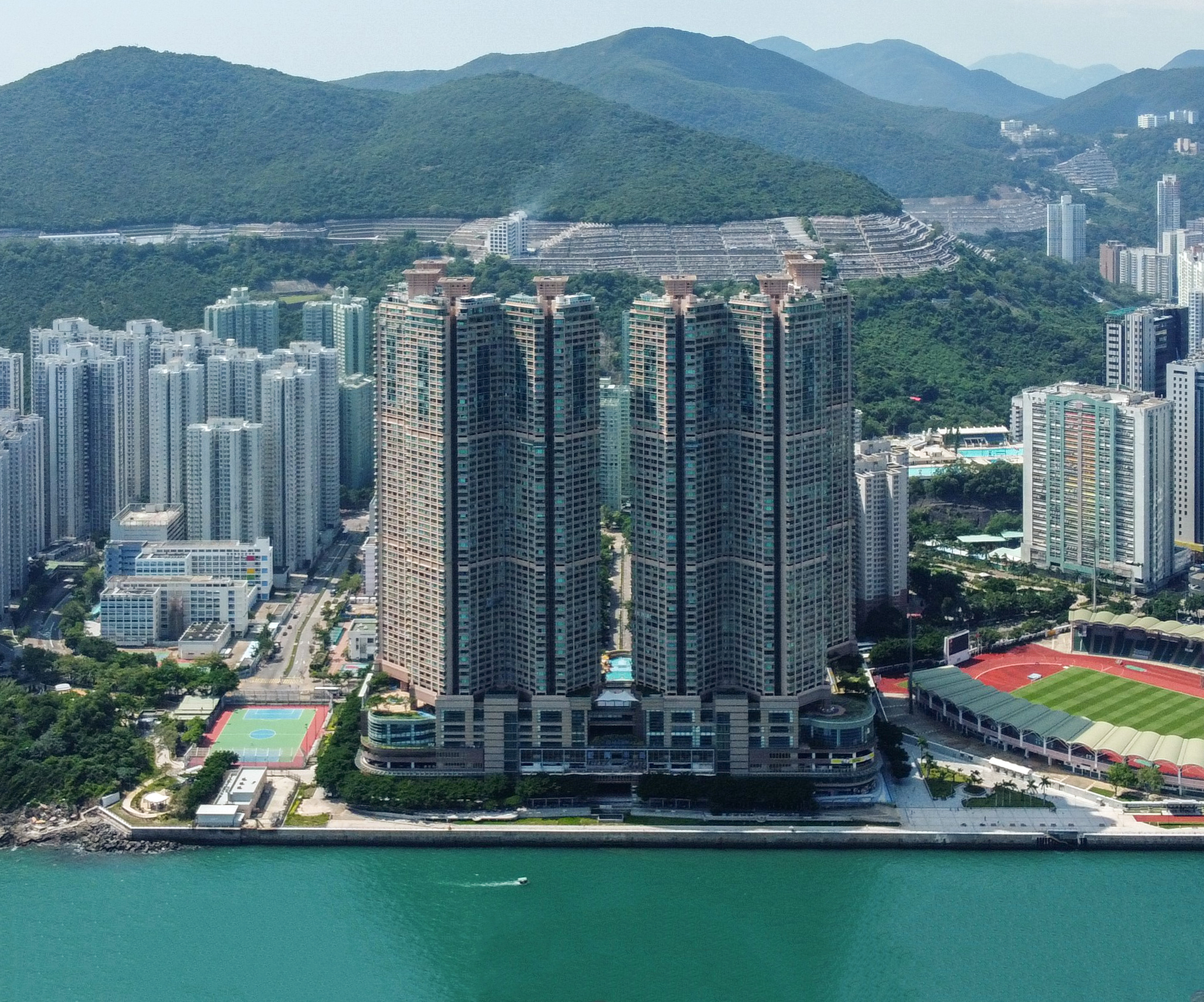
View of Cape Collinson Chinese Permanent Cemetery on the mountain slope.

Cape Collinson Chinese Permanent Cemetery (Chinese: 柴灣華人永遠墳場; lit. 'Chai Wan Chinese Permanent Cemetery') is a private, non-profit cemetery in Cape Collinson, Hong Kong. It is one of the largest cemeteries in Hong Kong.

The term 'Permanent' refers to the cemetery site, not the graves. The cemetery is nevertheless like all other plots of land in the territory subject to a land lease. For this cemetery the lease expire in 2036.

== History ==
Cape Collinson Chinese Permanent Cemetery was opened in 1963 by The Board of Management of the Chinese Permanent Cemeteries, a statutory body of Hong Kong established in 1913, that manages four Chinese permanent cemeteries in the territory. The cemetery was extended in 1973.

== Notable burials ==
- Chung Chi-yung, educator, co-founder and principal of the Shue Yan College/Shue Yan University, former judge
- Choi Park Lai, almanacist
- Lam Sheung Yee, international footballer, educator and football commentator
- Shum Wai Yau, journalist, founder of Wah Kiu Yat Po

== See also ==
- Cape Collinson Crematorium
- Holy Cross Catholic Cemetery
- Sai Wan War Cemetery
- List of cemeteries in Hong Kong
