= List of cemeteries in Hong Kong =

The following is a list of cemeteries in Hong Kong.

== Hong Kong Island ==
- Aberdeen Chinese Permanent Cemetery (BMCPC)
- Carmelite Cemetery
- Chiu Yuen Cemetery, Mount Davis – Private cemetery of Hotung clan
- Hong Kong Chinese Christian Churches Union Pok Fu Lam Road Cemetery (香港華人基督教聯會薄扶林道墳場)
- Kai Lung Wan Cemetery (雞籠灣墳場) - Former cemetery. Wah Fu Estate was built at this location.
- Mount Caroline Cemetery (FEHD)
- Stanley Prison Cemetery (FEHD). Venue managed by the Correctional Services Department.
- Stanley Military Cemetery – Not only one of the major military cemeteries of Hong Kong, but also one of the last battlefields of Hong Kong Defence, 1941

=== Cape Collinson ===
- Cape Collinson Chinese Permanent Cemetery (BMCPC)
- Cape Collinson Military Cemetery – Buried for British military in Hong Kong, also this cemetery was managed by Commonwealth War Graves Commission
- Cape Collinson Muslim Cemetery aka. Chai Wan Muslim Cemetery - Adjacent to Chai Wan Mosque.
- Holy Cross Catholic Cemetery
- Hong Kong Buddhist Cemetery
- Sai Wan War Cemetery – Most of the World War II of Hong Kong and East Asia Stage war dead are buried there

=== Happy Valley ===
- Happy Valley Jewish Cemetery c. 1855 and purchased by Sasson family
- Happy Valley Muslim Cemetery
- Hindu Cemetery – c. 1880s and includes a temple building
- Hong Kong Cemetery (FEHD) – Established in 1845. The early western cemetery in the early colonial era of Hong Kong
- Hong Kong Parsee Cemetery – c. 1852
- St. Michael's Catholic Cemetery

== Kowloon and New Kowloon ==
- Chinese Christian Cemetery – Kowloon City District
- Hau Pui Loong Cemetery. Former cemetery
- New Kowloon Cemetery No. 8 (Diamond Hill Urn Cemetery) (FEHD) - Diamond Hill. Officially designated in 1939, but may have been in use earlier. It was closed in 1961.
- St. Raphael's Catholic Cemetery – Cheung Sha Wan

== New Territories ==
- Fu Shan, in Tai Wai. Columbarium only
- Gallant Garden is the cemetery for civil and public servants who died in service
- Gurkha Military Cemetery – Built in Cassino Line (now San Tin Barracks) at San Tin of Yuen Long District
- Heung Shek Cemetery (響石墳場)
- Po Fook Hill (寶福山), in Sha Tin
- Sai Kung Catholic Cemetery
- Sandy Ridge Cemetery (FEHD)
- Tao Fong Shan Christian Cemetery (道風山基督教墳場), part of Tao Fong Shan Christian Center
- Tseung Kwan O Chinese Permanent Cemetery (BMCPC)
- Tsuen Wan Chinese Permanent Cemetery (BMCPC)
- Wo Hop Shek Public Cemetery (FEHD) – largest in Hong Kong
- Tsang Tsui
- Private Family Cemetery of General Shen Hongying (沈鴻英私人墓園) in Pat Heung off Kam Po Road, adjacent to the Taoism Jiu Xiao Guan (Hong Kong)

=== Islands District ===
- Cheung Chau Catholic Cemetery (長洲天主教墳場)
- Cheung Chau Cemetery (FEHD)
- Cheung Chau Christian Cemetery (長洲基督教墳場)
- Mui Wo Lai Chi Yuen Cemetery (FEHD)
- Tai O Cemetery (FEHD)

== See also ==
- Cape Collinson Crematorium
- Tung Wah Coffin Home
