= The Board of Management of the Chinese Permanent Cemeteries =

Statutory body of Hong Kong

The Board of Management of the Chinese Permanent Cemeteries (BMCPC) (Chinese: 華人永遠墳場管理委員會), established in 1913, is a statutory body of Hong Kong under the Chinese Permanent Cemeteries Ordinance (Cap. 1112) enacted in 1964. It manages four Chinese permanent cemeteries in the territory.

The term 'Permanent' refers to the cemetery site, not the graves.

== Cemeteries ==
The four cemeteries managed by the BMCPC are:

- Aberdeen Chinese Permanent Cemetery
- Cape Collinson Chinese Permanent Cemetery
- Tseung Kwan O Chinese Permanent Cemetery
- Tsuen Wan Chinese Permanent Cemetery

== See also ==
- List of cemeteries in Hong Kong
