= Tsuen Wan Chinese Permanent Cemetery =

Cemetery in Kwai Chung, New Territories, Hong Kong

Coordinates: 22.359168°N 114.11634°E

- Traditional Chinese: 荃灣華人永遠墳場
- Simplified Chinese: 荃湾华人永远坟场
Transcriptions
Standard Mandarin
- Hanyu Pinyin: Quánwān huárén yǒngyuǎn fénchǎng
- Wade–Giles: Ch‘üan^{2}-wan^{1} hua^{2}-jên^{2} yung^{3}-yüan^{3} fên^{2}-ch‘ang^{3}
- IPA: [tɕʰɥɛ̌n.wán xwǎ.ɻə̌n jʊ̀ŋ.ɥɛ̀n fə̌n.ʈʂʰàŋ]
Yue: Cantonese
- Yale Romanization: Chyùhnwāan wàhyàhn wíhng'yúhn fàhnchèuhng
- Jyutping: cyun4 waan2 waa4 jan4 wing5 jyun5 fan4 coeng4
- IPA: [tsʰyn˩.wan˥ wa˩.jɐn˩ wɪŋ˩˧.jyn˩˧ fɐn˩.tsʰœŋ˩]

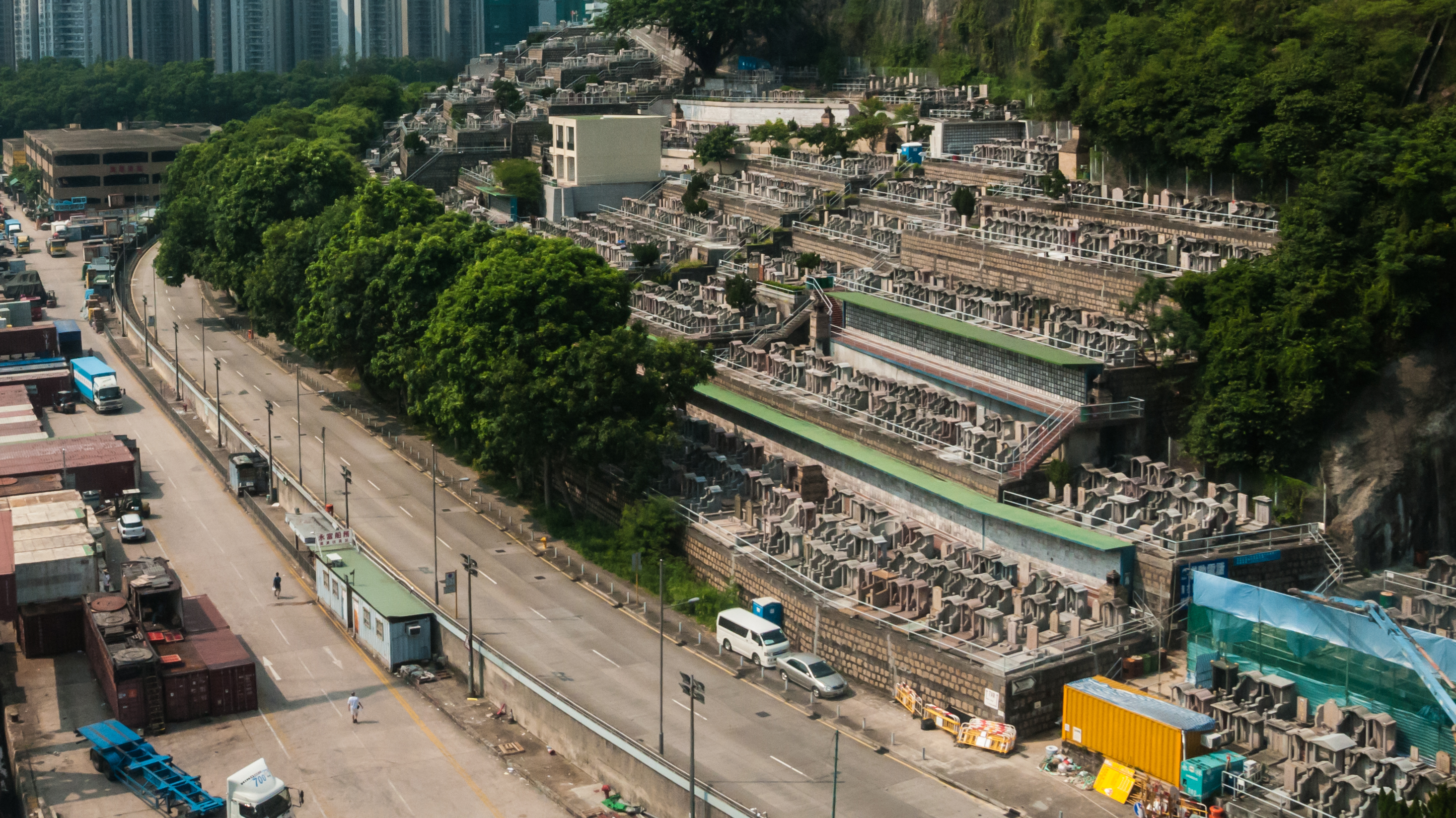
Tsuen Wan Chinese Permanent Cemetery.

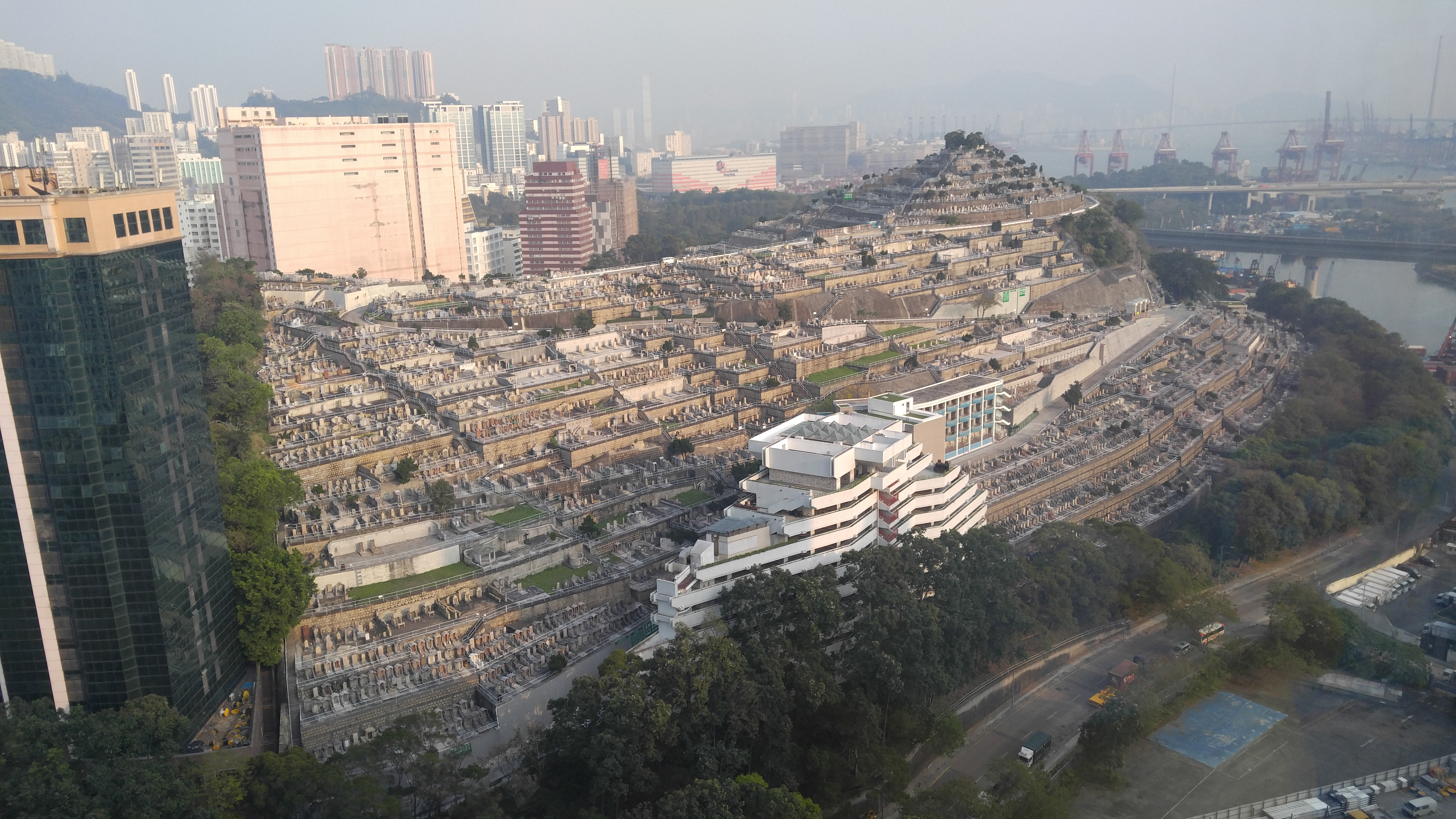
Tsuen Wan Chinese Permanent Cemetery.

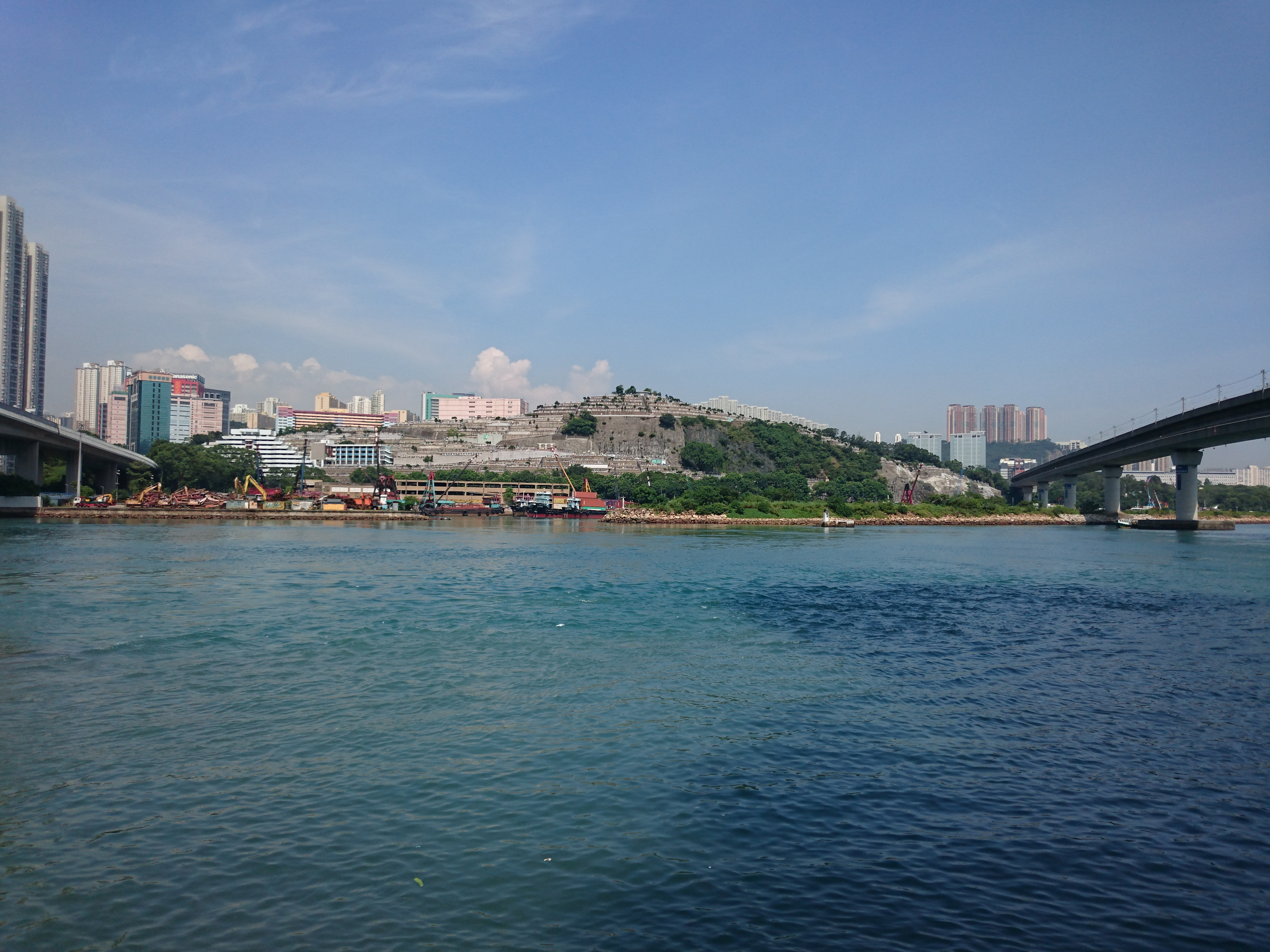
Tsuen Wan Chinese Permanent Cemetery viewed across Rambler Channel.

Tsuen Wan Chinese Permanent Cemetery (Chinese: 荃灣華人永遠墳場; Cantonese Yale: Chyùhnwāan wàhyàhn wíhng'yúhn fàhnchèuhng) is a cemetery in Kwai Chung, Hong Kong located adjacent to the Kwai Chung Public Mortuary. It is managed by The Board of Management of the Chinese Permanent Cemeteries (華人永遠墳場管理委員會). It is the second Chinese permanent cemetery in Hong Kong after Aberdeen Chinese Permanent Cemetery and it lies on the slopes between Riviera Gardens and Tsuen Wan Abattoir, facing Gin Drinkers Bay and Rambler Channel. The term 'Permanent' refers to the cemetery site, not the graves.

In terms of administrative divisions, Tsuen Wan District and Kwai Tsing District are bounded by Texaco Road and Tsing Tsuen Bridge. The cemetery is located to the south of the boundary line, so it belongs to Kwai Tsing District.

== History ==
On 9 August 1935, the Hong Kong Government had approved the land in Tsuen Wan with an area of about 120,000 m^{2}. It was opened on 19 June 1941 and is one of the four Chinese Permanent Cemeteries in Hong Kong.

In order to provide more niches to meet demand, the two columbaria in the cemetery were completed in 1974 and 1987 respectively and the expansion of the first columbarium was completed in 2015, in order to cope with the popularity of cremation niches to bring in high demand.

== Notable burials ==
- Eu Tong Sen (1877–1941), leading businessman in Malaya, Singapore and Hong Kong
- Chan Chak (1894–1949), admiral of the Republic of China Navy
- Tam Woon-tong (1872–1954), former Prime Minister of Po Leung Kuk, founder of Kowloon Motor Bus
- Li Zuyong (1903–1959), Hong Kong film producer and entrepreneur
- Tang Ti-sheng (1917–1959), Cantonese opera playwright, scriptwriter, and film director
- Henry Leong (1890–1961), comprador of Jardine Matheson in the 20th century
- Au-Yeung Kim (1914–1961), Hong Kong film actor
- Chan Nam Cheong (1900–1971), founder of Vitasoy, The Hong Kong Sze Yap Commercial and Industrial Association and San Wui Commercial Society
- Alan Li Fook-sum (1937–2003), former chairman of Kowloon Dairy and Hong Kong Jockey Club

== See also ==
- List of cemeteries in Hong Kong
