= Pottinger Peak =

Mountain on Hong Kong Island

- 砵甸乍山
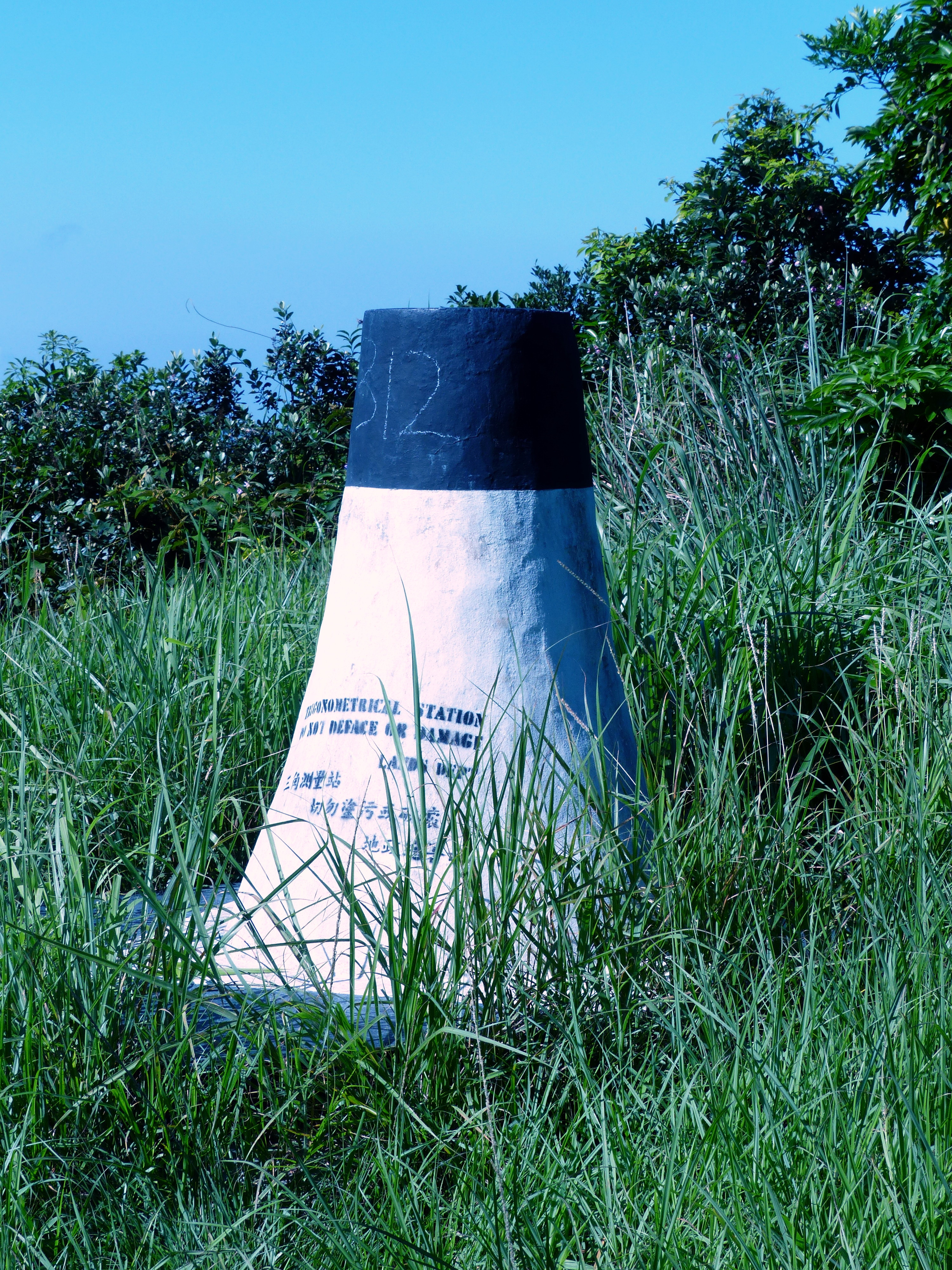
- A triangulation station atop Pottinger Peak

Highest point
- Elevation: 312 m (1,024 ft)
- Coordinates: 22°15′N 114°15′E

Geography
- Location within Hong Kong
- Location: Eastern Hong Kong Island, Hong Kong

Pottinger Peak (Chinese: 砵甸乍山; Jyutping: but3 din6 zaa3 saan1) is a mountain on the eastern side of Hong Kong Island. It is located south of Chai Wan and Siu Sai Wan and north of Big Wave Bay. Initially known as Ma Tong Peak, it was renamed Pottinger Peak after Henry Pottinger, the first Governor of Hong Kong. The peak is 312 m (1,024 ft) above sea level.

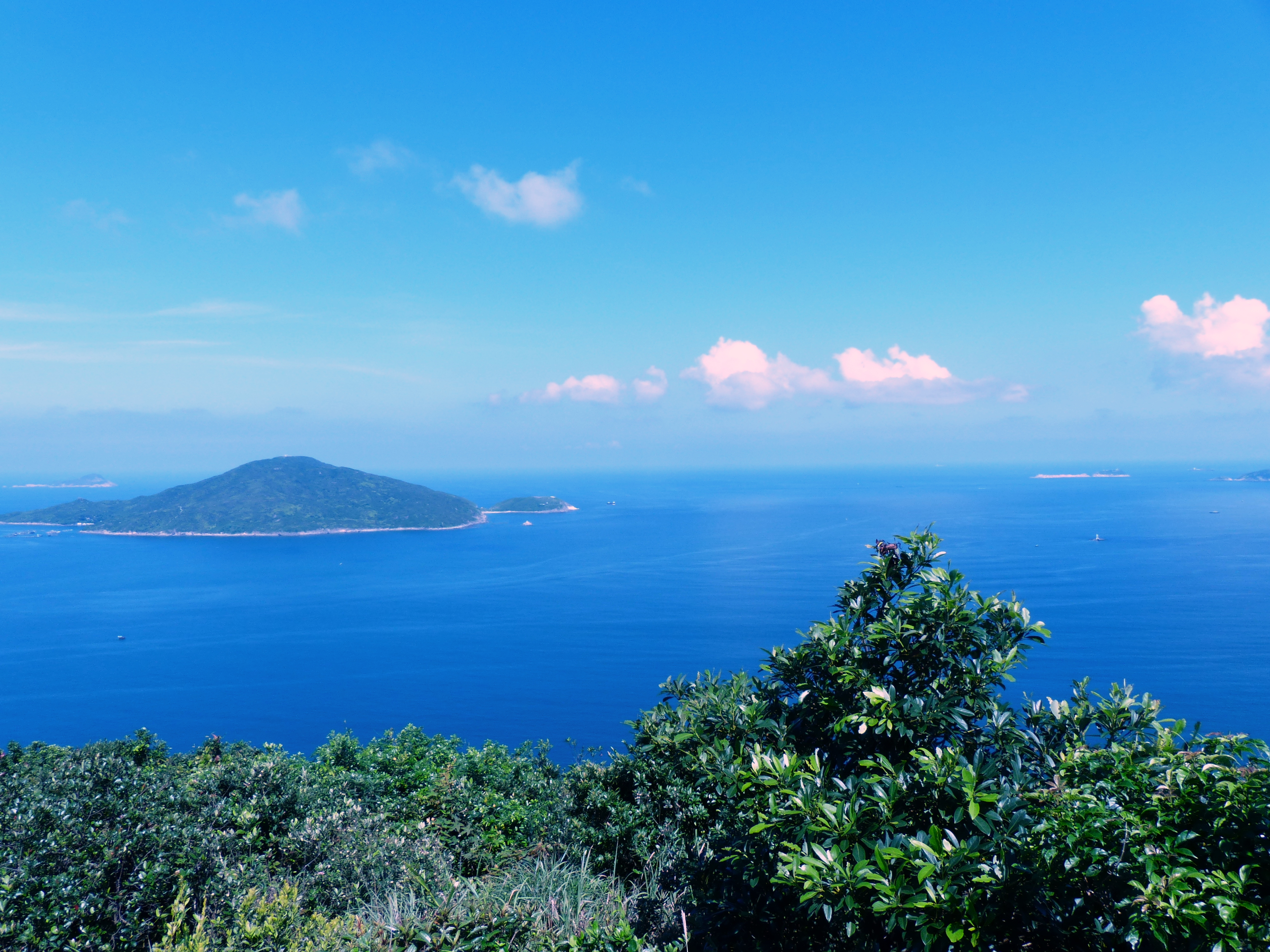
View from Pottinger Peak Observatory Central

== See also ==
- List of mountains, peaks and hills in Hong Kong
