= Cape Collinson Crematorium =

Crematorium in Hong Kong Island, Hong Kong

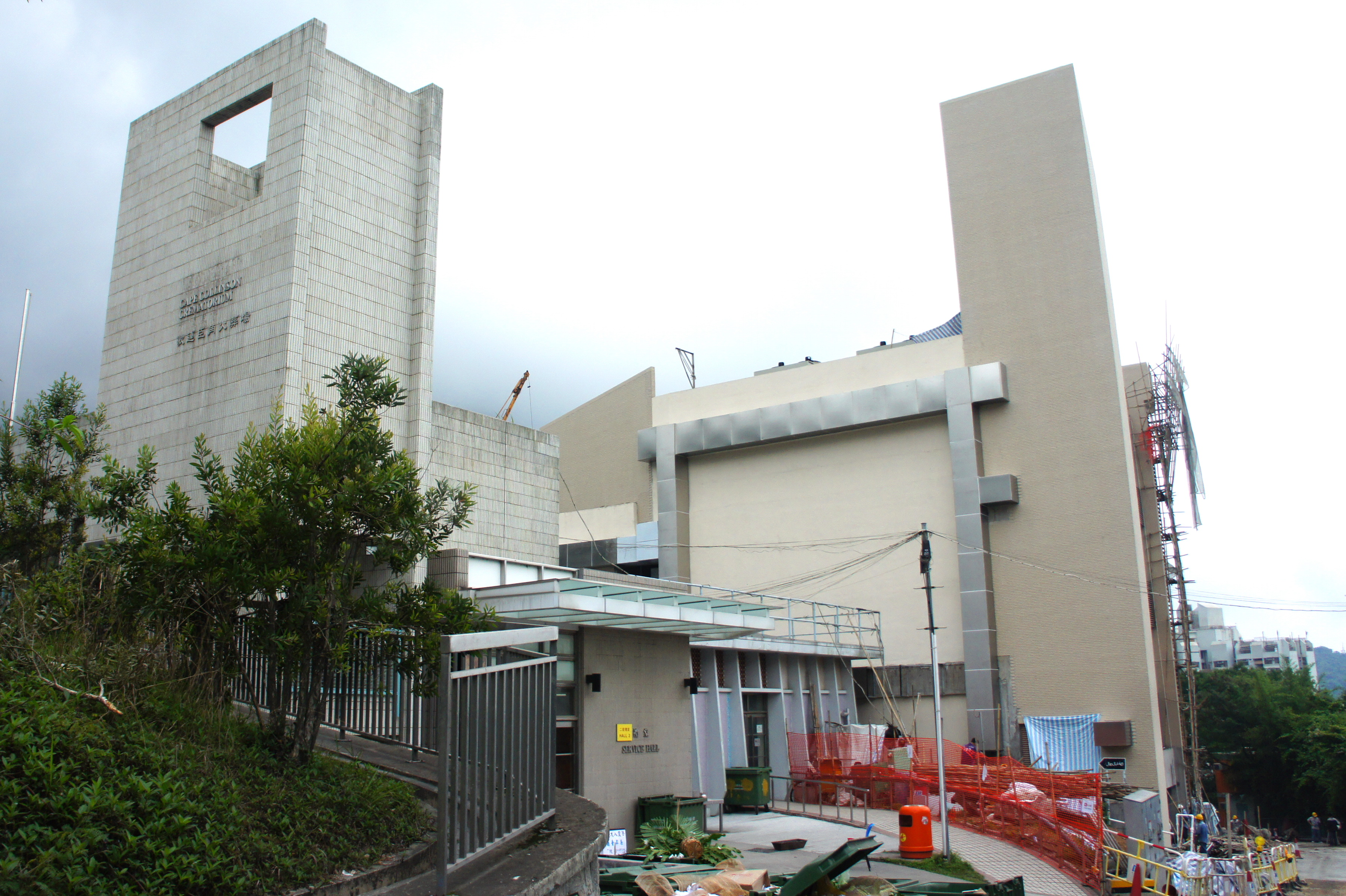
- Cape Collinson Crematorium undergoing improvement works

General information
- Type: Crematorium
- Location: 9 Cape Collinson Road, Tai Tam Gap, Hong Kong
- Coordinates: 22.25832°N 114.23039°E
- Completed: 1962; 64 years ago
- Owner: Food and Environmental Hygiene Department

Cape Collinson Crematorium is a crematorium located in Tai Tam Gap, Eastern District, Hong Kong. It was opened in 1962 and is located near Cape Collinson Road and more cemeteries in Chai Wan area, where the columbaria niches are located. The crematorium is managed by the Food and Environmental Hygiene Department of the Hong Kong Government. In addition to the basic cremation services, there is a garden of remembrance and a 7-storey columbarium of about 56 m^{2} for spreading cremated ashes.

Amongst many of Hong Kong's funeral facilities, Cape Collinson Crematorium is located furthest away from residential areas. Therefore, many celebrities in the city choose to be cremated in this crematorium after their deaths.

== History ==
In view of the increasing demand for cremation services, the Food and Environmental Hygiene Department would rebuild the Cape Collinson Crematorium in two phases which included the rebuilding of ten new cremation furnaces and ancillary facilities on the original site, which was expected to be completed in December 2014. In order to reduce the air pollutants generated during combustion, the new cremator would use coal gas as fuel instead of ultra-low sulfur diesel.

== Notable burials ==
- Run Run Shaw (1907–2014), Hong Kong entertainment mogul and philanthropist
- Szeto Wah (1931–2011), Hong Kong democracy activist and politician, founding chairman of the Hong Kong Alliance in Support of Patriotic Democratic Movements of China, the Hong Kong Professional Teachers' Union
- Lo Man-wai (1895–1985), Hong Kong lawyer and politician
- Yung Fung-shee (1900–1972), Hong Kong philanthropist
- Elsie Tu (1913–2015), English-born Hong Kong social activist, member of Urban Council (1963–1995) and member of the Legislative Council of Hong Kong (1988–1995)
- Ng Man-tat (1950–2021), Hong Kong actor
- Lee Heung-kam (1932–2021), Hong Kong actress
- Lily Leung (1929–2019), Hong Kong actress
- Cheng Yu-tung (1925–2016), Hong Kong billionaire
- Michael Lai Siu-tin (1946–2019), Hong Kong music composer, record producer and actor
- Coco Lee (1975–2023), Hong Kong singer
- Tung Chee-hwa (1937-2026)

== See also ==
- List of cemeteries in Hong Kong
