= Hong Kong Buddhist Cemetery =

Cemetery in Hong Kong

Coordinates: 22.256839°N 114.233327°E

- Traditional Chinese: 香港佛教墳場
- Simplified Chinese: 香港佛教坟场
Transcriptions
Standard Mandarin
- Hanyu Pinyin: Xiāng Gǎng Fó Jiào Fén Chǎng
Yue: Cantonese
- Yale Romanization: Hēung góng faht gaau fàhn chèuhng
- Jyutping: Hoeng1 gong2 fat6 gaau3 fan4 coeng4

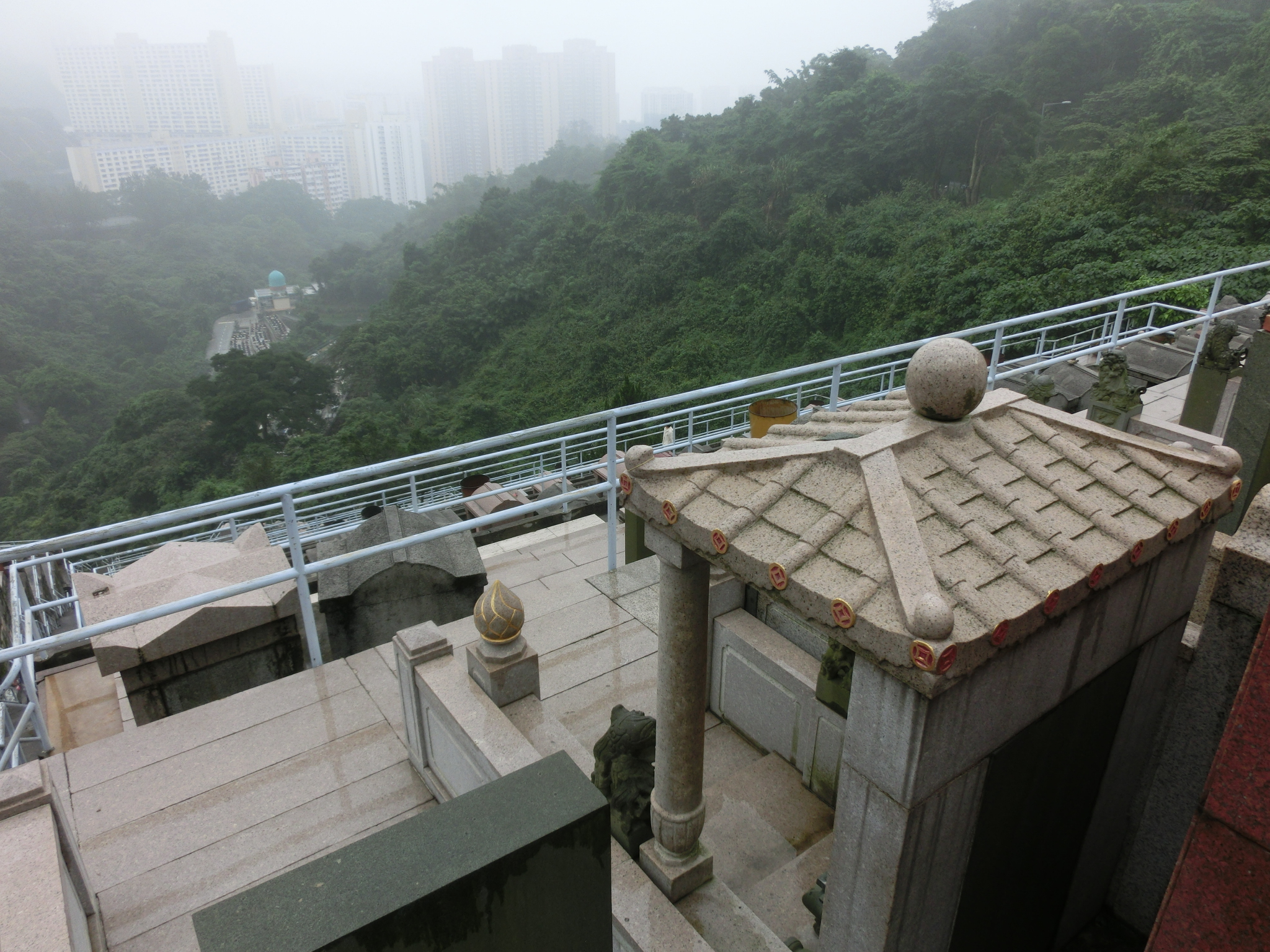
Hong Kong Buddhist Cemetery

Hong Kong Buddhist Cemetery is a private cemetery located in Cape Collinson, on Hong Kong Island, Hong Kong. It is managed by The Hong Kong Buddhist Association (香港佛教聯合會). The cemetery was completed and opened in 1963.

== Notable burials ==
- Lee Chi Hung (1891–1967), founder of Sun Hing Group of Companies
- Henry Fok (1923–2006), Vice Chairman of the CPPCC (1993–2006)
- Li Ka-suen, brother of Li Ka-shing
- Li Ka-chiu, second brother of Li Ka-shing
- Chong Yuet Ming (1933–1990), wife of Li Ka-shing
- S.C. Tung (1881–1932), grandfather of Tung Chee-hwa
- Ho Sin Hang (1900–1997), co-founder of Hang Seng Bank
- Wu Chung (1902–1991), father of Gordon Wu

== See also ==
- List of cemeteries in Hong Kong
