= Holy Cross Catholic Cemetery =

Cemetery in Hong Kong

Coordinates: 22.259068°N 114.235189°E

- Traditional Chinese: 天主教聖十字架墳場
- Simplified Chinese: 天主教圣十字架坟场
Transcriptions
Standard Mandarin
- Hanyu Pinyin: Tiān Zhǔ Jiào Shèng Shí Zì Jià Fén Chǎng
Yue: Cantonese
- Yale Romanization: Tīn jyú gaau sing sahp jih ga fàhn chèuhng
- Jyutping: Tin^{1} zyu^{2} gaau^{3} sing^{3} sap^{6} zi^{6} gaa^{3*2} fan^{4} coeng^{4}

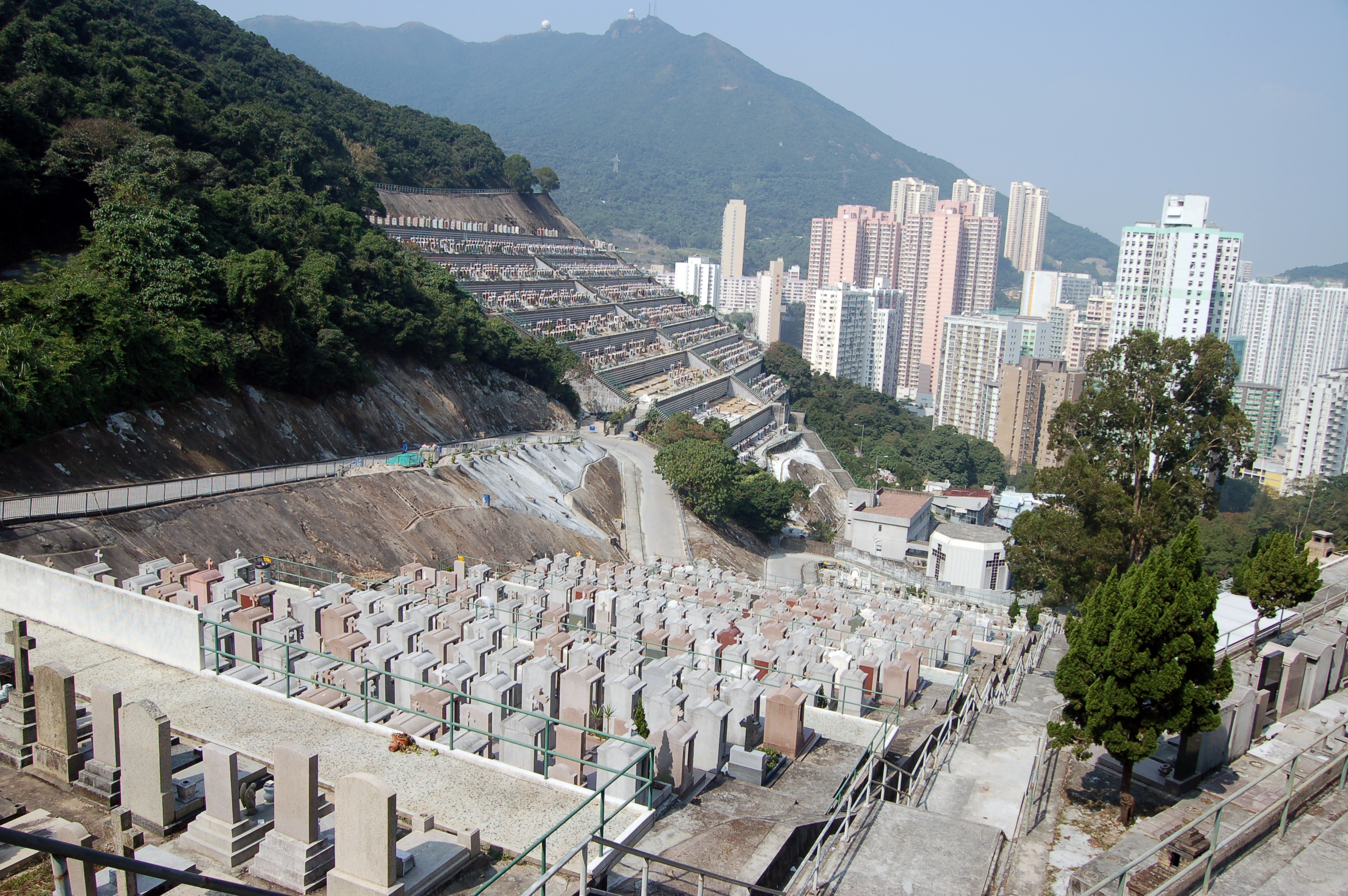
Holy Cross Catholic Cemetery

Holy Cross Catholic Cemetery is a private cemetery located in Cape Collinson, on Hong Kong Island, Hong Kong. It is managed by The Catholic Diocese of Hong Kong (天主教香港教區). The cemetery was completed and opened in 1960.

== Notable burials ==
- Rev. Stephen B. Edmonds (1911–2005), founder of Meng Tak Catholic School, Chai Wan Star of the Sea Catholic Primary School and Mary Help of Christians Primary School
- Richard Lam Chun-Keung (1948–2003), Cantopop lyricist
- Tsang Wan (1920–1997), police officer and father of former Chief Executive Donald Tsang and the father of former Commissioner of Police Tsang Yam-pui
- Thomas Koo (1987–2012), victim of the 2012 Lamma Island ferry collision
- Chan Man Ying, victim of the 2012 Lamma Island ferry collision
- Yuen Wai-Hung (1955–1998), actor, son of Lily Leung

== See also ==
- List of cemeteries in Hong Kong
