= Siu Sai Wan Extension =

Proposed railway line extension in Hong Kong

Siu Sai Wan 小西灣

Chinese name
- Traditional Chinese: 小西灣
- Simplified Chinese: 小西湾
- Literal meaning: Little west bay
Transcriptions
Standard Mandarin
- Hanyu Pinyin: Xiǎoxīwān
Yue: Cantonese
- Jyutping: siu^{2}sai^{1}waan^{1}

General information
- Location: Siu Sai Wan; Eastern District; Hong Kong
- System: Formerly proposed MTR rapid transit station (shelved)
- Owner: MTR Corporation
- Operator: MTR Corporation
- Line: Island line

Services
Preceding station	MTR	Following station
Extension
Chai Wan towards Kennedy Town	Island line	Terminus
Bifurcation
Heng Fa Chuen towards Kennedy Town	Island line	Terminus

Siu Sai Wan Extension (Chinese: 小西灣綫) was a proposed extension of the Island line to Siu Sai Wan on the eastern end of the Hong Kong Island. A plan was revealed in 2001 after many calls from the Eastern District Board (later District Council) since 1991. Although the population size in Siu Sai Wan is large enough to support a station, the plan was later shelved, despite continued calls from the Eastern District Council.

== Proposals ==
In February 2013 review and update of the Railway Development Strategy 2000, Highway Departments proposed three schemes to extend the current railway network to Siu Sai Wan area, either by extending after the current Chai Wan terminus, branching off from Heng Fa Chuen station or constructing a new medium capacity railway system from Heng Fa Chuen.

=== Extension ===
An extension would have extended the Island line from the current south-eastern terminus Chai Wan station to Siu Sai Wan. The alignment of the existing Island line, however, made it difficult to extend the line from the terminus Chai Wan station. Such an extension would have required a U-shaped tunnel passing through Pottinger Peak. Certain nearby buildings would have needed to be demolished to make space for the extension.

=== Bifurcation ===
An alternative plan was to build a Y-shaped branch from Heng Fa Chuen station. A bifurcation would require reclamation of the Chai Wan Cargo Handling Basin. However, because of the spur line, some trains would not stop at Chai Wan station, resulting in a lower train frequency.

=== Feeder ===
Siu Sai Wan residents using this feeder line would have needed to interchange at Heng Fa Chuen station to the Island line. This is similar to other road-based transport systems. While reclamation might not be required, private land and land for recreational purposes will need to be used for the construction of the feeder line. As the feeder line was planned to have run on a viaduct, there were concerns on the visual and noise impacts to nearby buildings.
