= Shau Kei Wan station =

MTR station on Hong Kong Island

Shau Kei Wan 筲箕灣
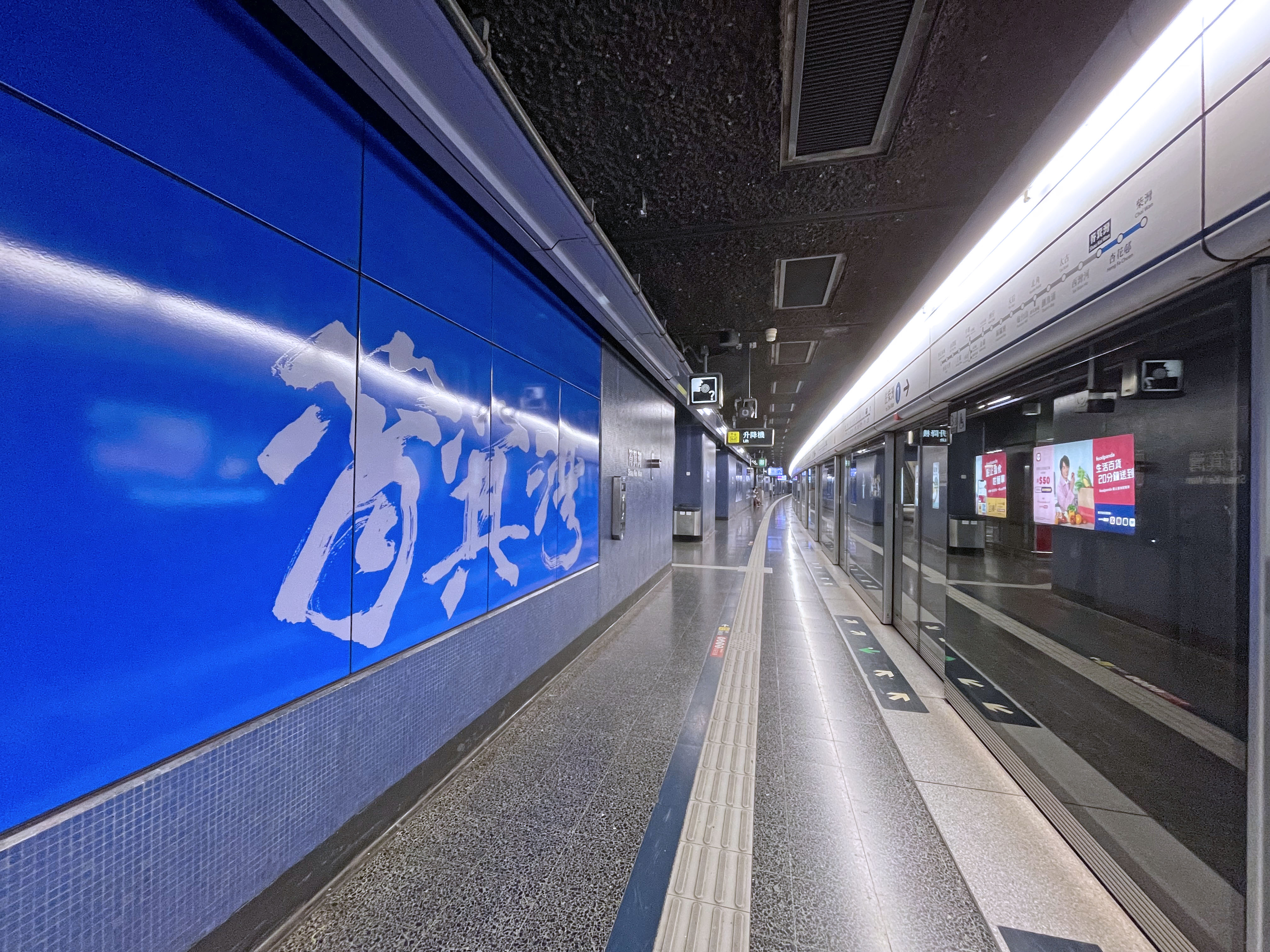
- Platform 1

Chinese name
- Traditional Chinese: 筲箕灣
- Simplified Chinese: 筲箕湾
- Hanyu Pinyin: Shāojīwān
- Cantonese Yale: Sāaugēiwāan
- Literal meaning: Bamboo basin bay
Transcriptions
Standard Mandarin
- Hanyu Pinyin: Shāojīwān
Yue: Cantonese
- Yale Romanization: Sāaugēiwāan
- Jyutping: Saau1gei1waan1

General information
- Location: Mong Lung Street, Shau Kei Wan; Eastern District, Hong Kong
- Coordinates: 22°16′44″N 114°13′44″E
- System: MTR rapid transit station
- Owner: MTR Corporation
- Operator: MTR Corporation
- Line: Island line
- Platforms: 2 (1 island platform)
- Tracks: 2
- Connections: Tram; Bus, minibus

Construction
- Structure type: Underground
- Platform levels: 2
- Accessible: Yes

Other information
- Station code: SKW

History
- Opened: 31 May 1985; 41 years ago

Services
Preceding station	MTR	Following station
Sai Wan Ho towards Kennedy Town	Island line	Heng Fa Chuen towards Chai Wan
Track layout
Location
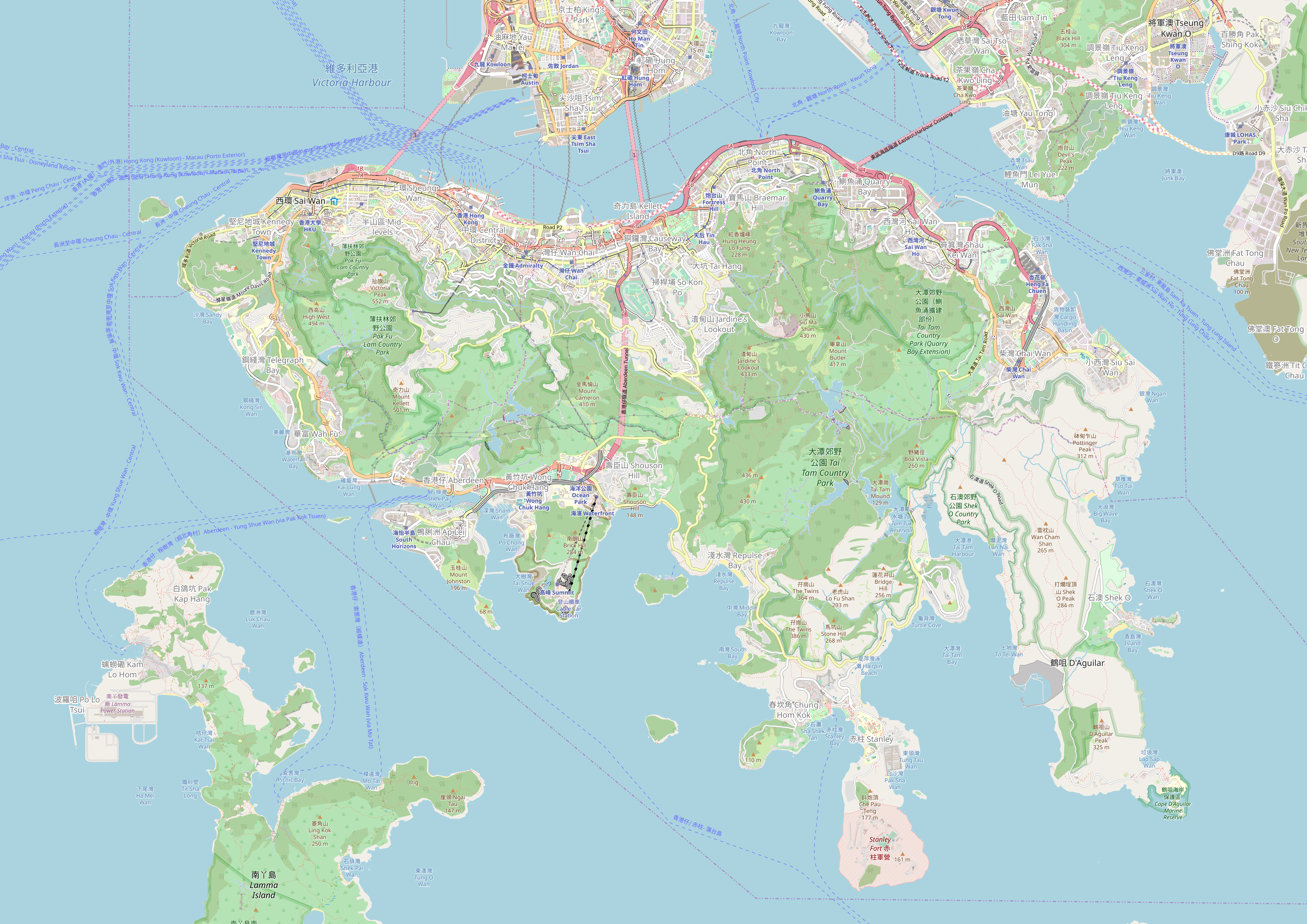
- Location within MTR Location within Hong Kong Island

Shau Kei Wan (Chinese: 筲箕灣; Cantonese Yale: Sāaugēiwāan) is a station on the Hong Kong MTR Island line in the neighborhood of Shau Kei Wan. Its concourse is located underground, and an island platform is used to serve trains on the Island line, to and from Kennedy Town and Chai Wan. Its station livery is indigo blue.

The retrofitting of platform screen doors was completed in October 2005.

== History ==
Construction of the station commenced in May 1982 on a newly reclaimed area of Aldrich Bay, and was carried out by Gammon Construction. Approximately 110,348 cubic metres (3,896,903 cu ft) of material was excavated during the course of construction. The station is around 12 metres (39 ft 4 in) deep and 190 metres (623 ft 4 in) long, and was built "bottom-up" within a steel sheet piled cofferdam. The structure was designed to support the new Island Eastern Corridor, an elevated motorway, directly above it.

Shau Kei Wan station opened on 31 May 1985 as part of the first phase of the Island line.

== Station layout ==
Platforms 1 and 2 share the same island platform.

G	Ground level	Exits
L1	Concourse	Customer Service, MTRShops
L1	Concourse	Vending machines, ATM
L2; Platform	Platform 1	Island line towards Chai Wan (Heng Fa Chuen) →
L2; Platform	Island platform, doors will open on the right
L2; Platform	Platform 2	← Island line towards Kennedy Town (Sai Wan Ho)

=== Entrances and exits ===
- A1: Perfect Mount Gardens
- A2: Po Man Street
- A3: Shau Kei Wan Bus Terminus
- B1: Shau Kei Wan Main Street East
- B2: Hong Kong Museum of the War of Resistance & Coastal Defence
- B3: Aldrich Bay Road
- C: Mong Lung Street
- D1: Tam Kung Temple, Hong Kong Art School
- D2: Aldrich Garden

== Transport connections ==
=== Hong Kong Tramways (Exit B1) ===
Hong Kong Island's tram system terminates at Shau Kei Wan. The terminus can be accessed from Exit B1 along Shau Kei Wan Main Street East.

== Gallery ==
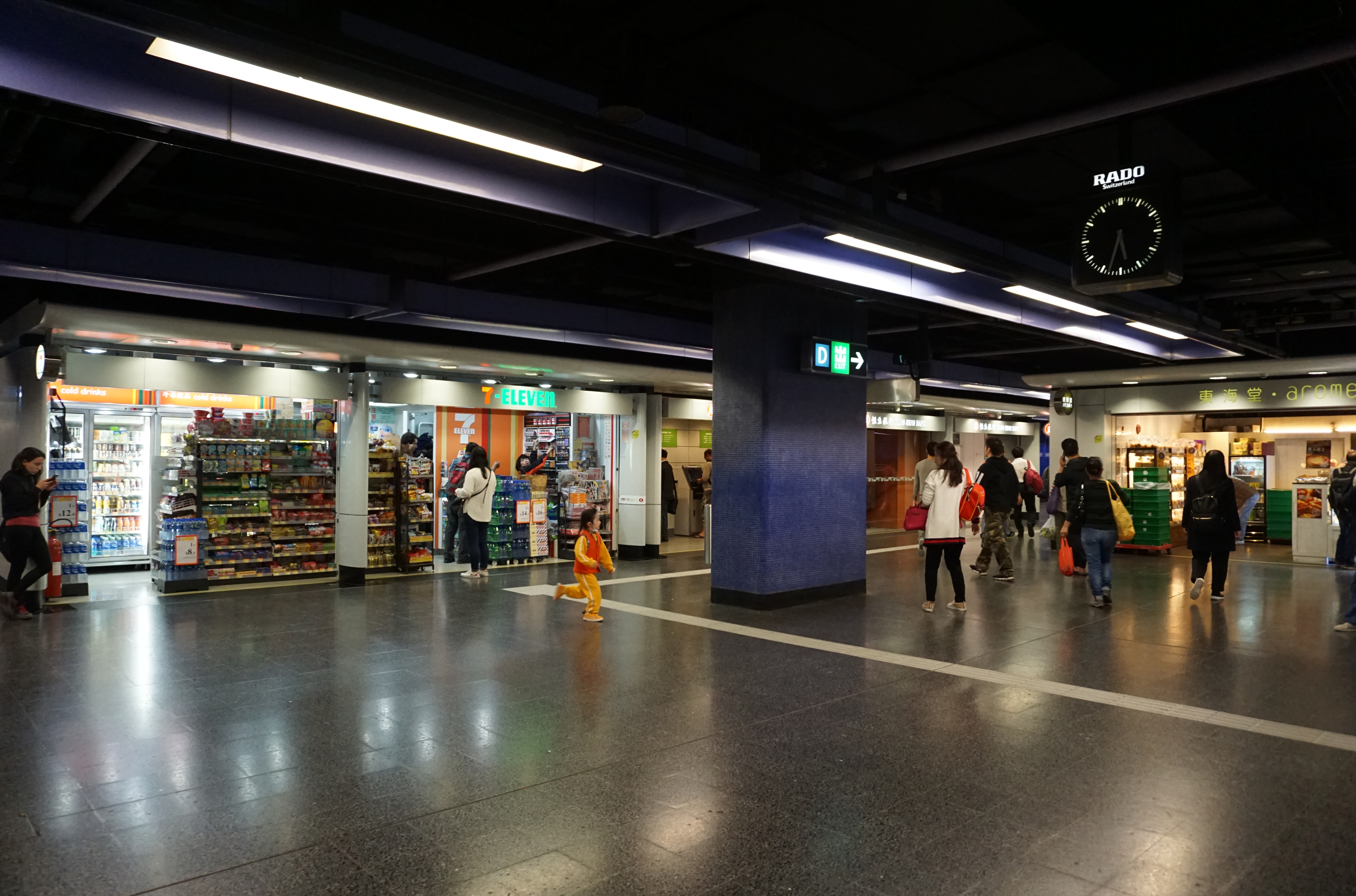
West shops

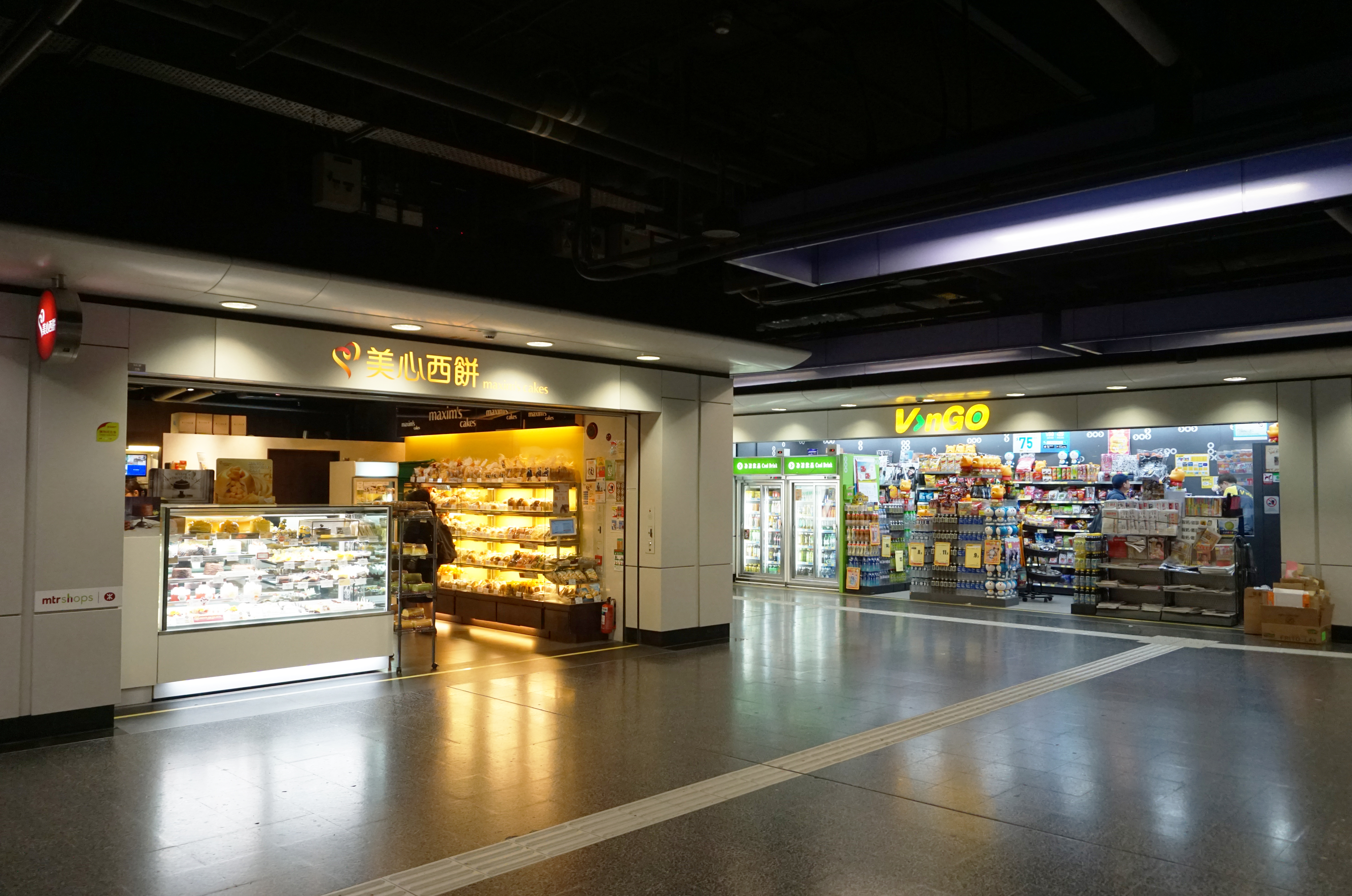
East shops

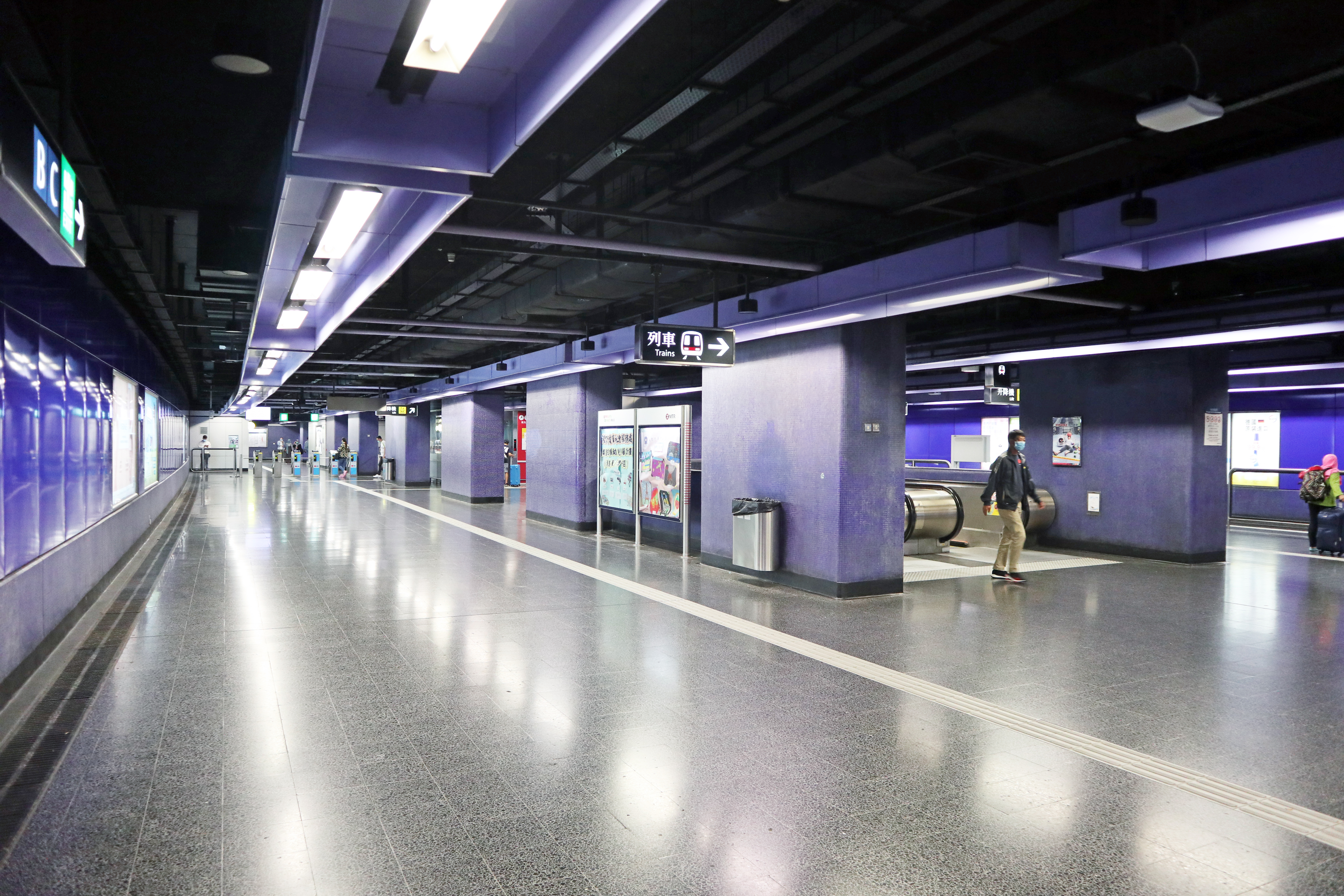
Concourse

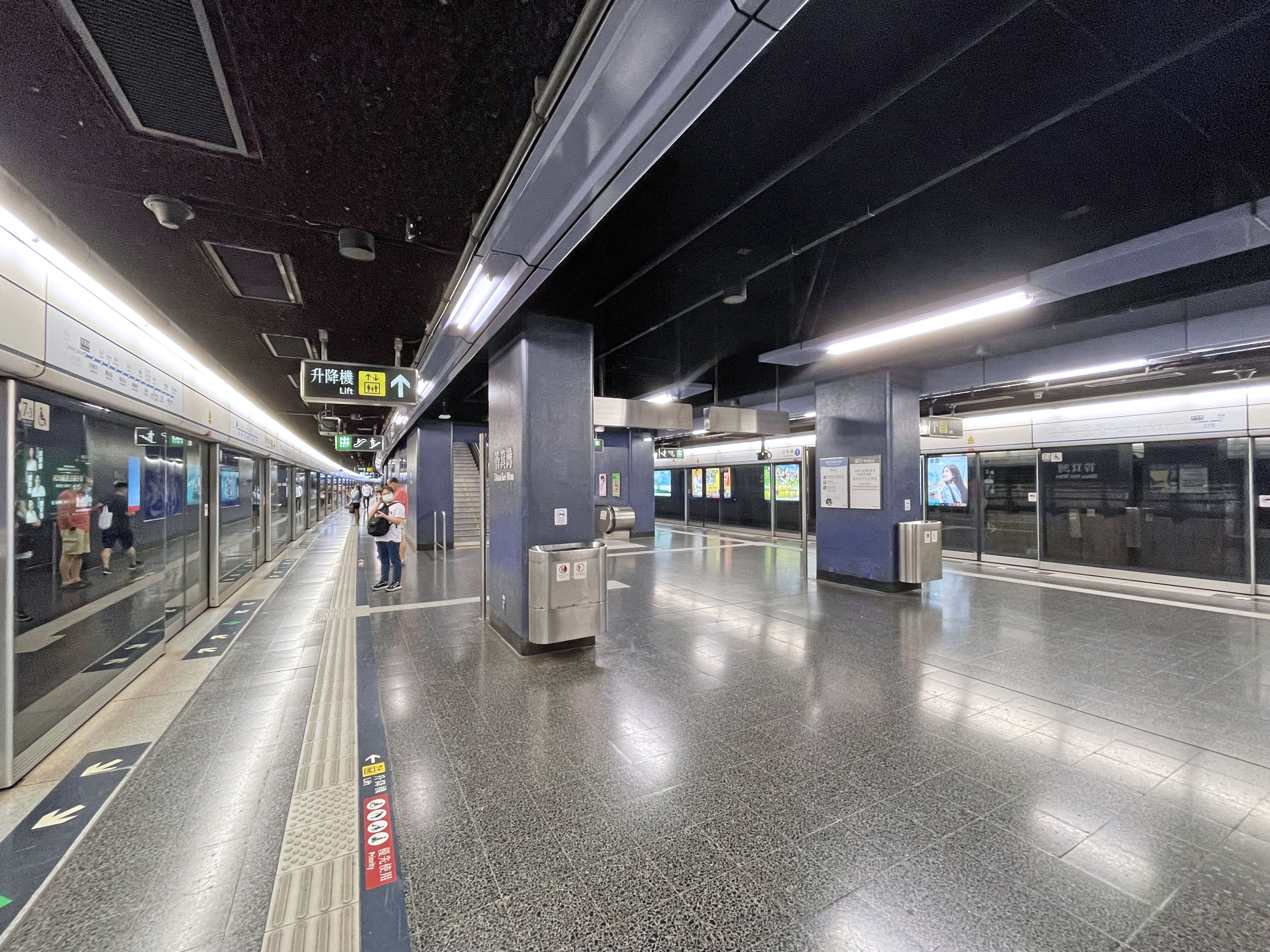
Both platforms

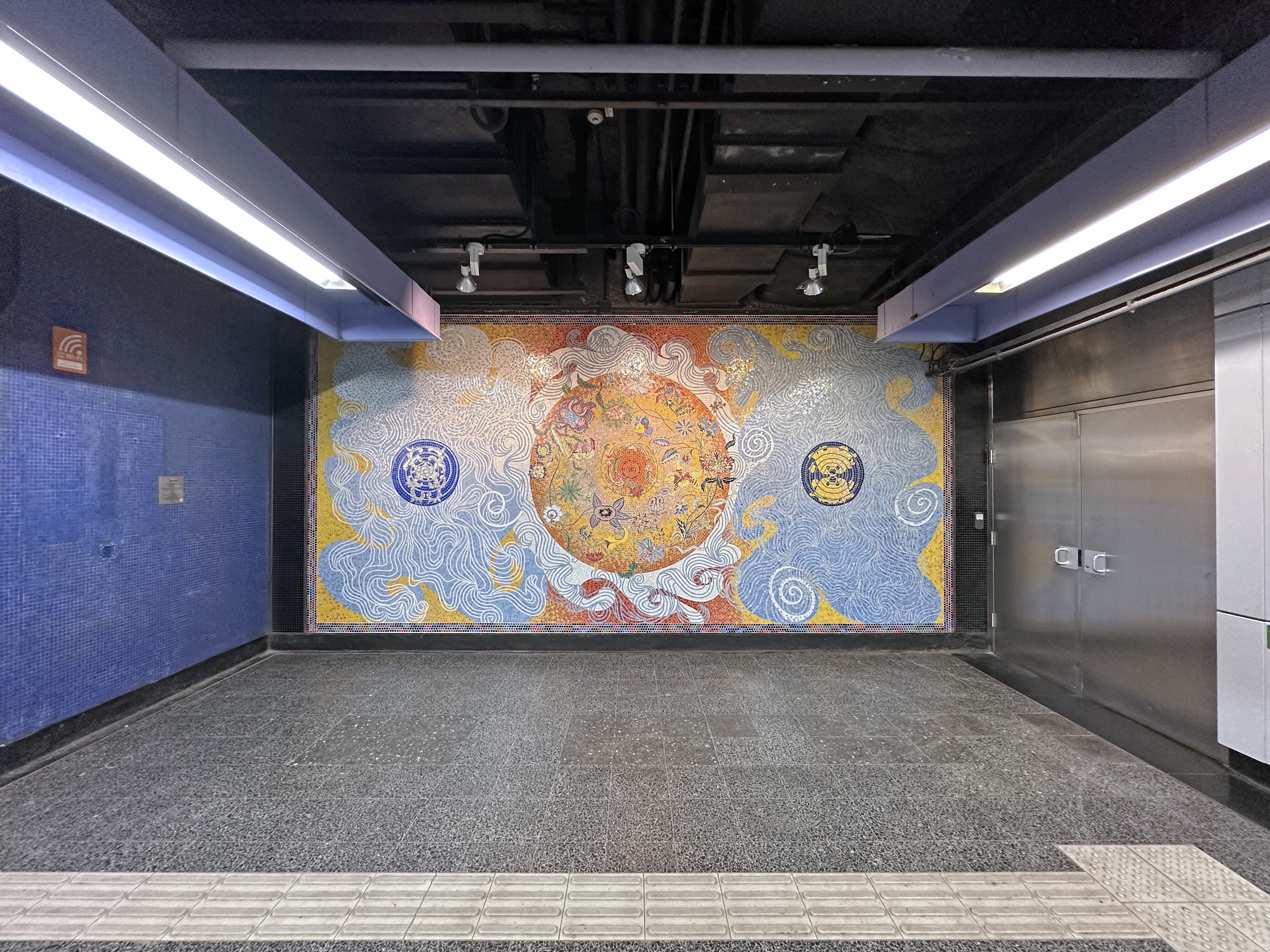
Artwork
