= Pak Sha Wan (Chai Wan) =

Coordinates: 22.2777°N 114.2403°E

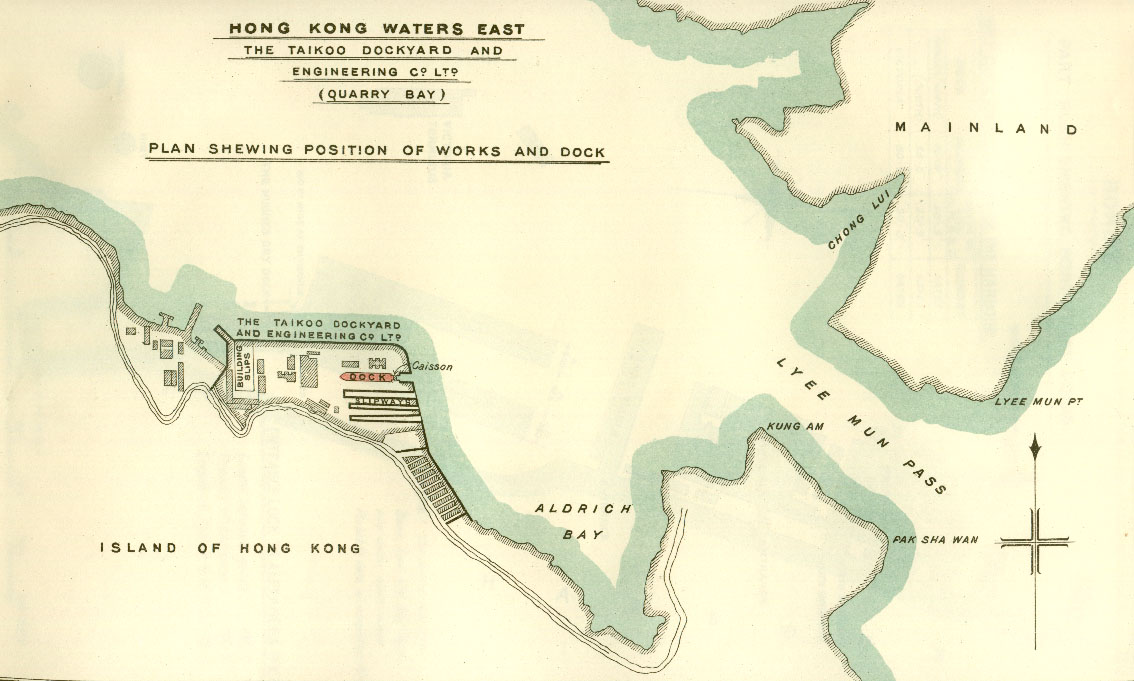
Map of Pak Sha Wan in the 1900s (decade)

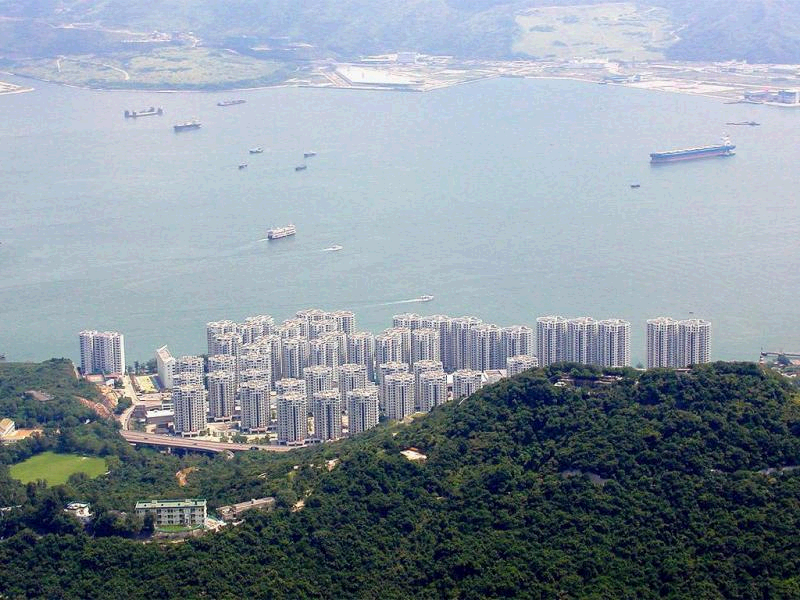
Heng Fa Chuen

Pak Sha Wan (Chinese: 白沙灣), or Lyee Mun Bay (Chinese: 鯉魚門灣), was a bay to the north of Chai Wan on Hong Kong Island, with Lei Yue Mun, Tseung Kwan O and Tathong Channel opposite. It was reclaimed to construct Heng Fa Chuen, one of the largest private housing estates on Hong Kong Island, MTR Heng Fa Chuen station and Chai Wan Depot.

== Others ==
- Heng Fa Chuen
- Heng Fa Chuen station
