= Heng Fa Chuen =

Housing estate in Chai Wan, Hong Kong

Coordinates: 22°16′39″N 114°14′21″E

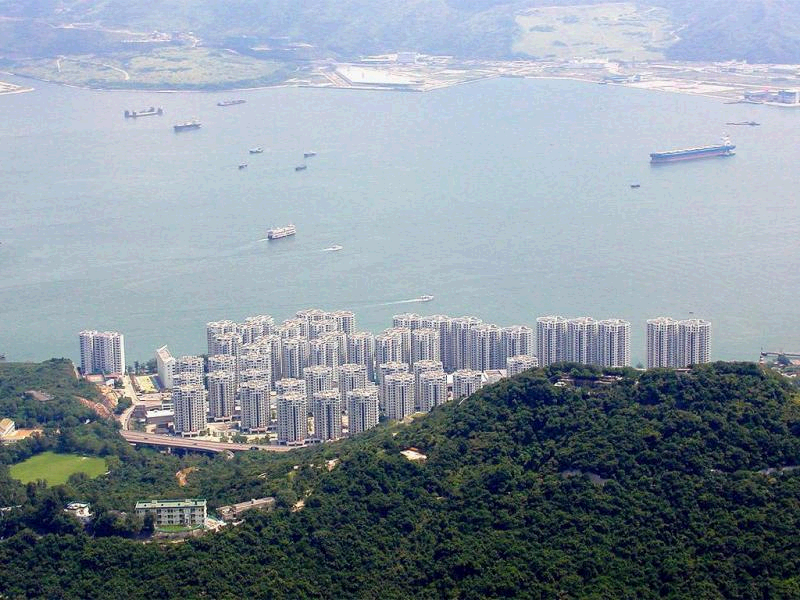
- A bird's eye view of Heng Fa Chuen
- Traditional Chinese: 杏花邨
- Simplified Chinese: 杏花邨
- Jyutping: Hang6 faa1 cyun1
- Literal meaning: Almond Flower Village
Transcriptions
Standard Mandarin
- Hanyu Pinyin: Xìnghuācūn
Yue: Cantonese
- Yale Romanization: Hahng fā
- Jyutping: Hang6 faa1 cyun1

Heng Fa Chuen is a private housing estate in Chai Wan, Hong Kong Island, Hong Kong, jointly developed by MTR Corporation and Heng Fa Chuen Development. It is located on the waterfront and offers views of the Tathong Channel. Heng Fa Chuen lies within the Eastern District.

== History ==
The area which is now known as Heng Fa Chuen was reclaimed from Pak Sha Wan (白沙灣) and Lei Yue Mun Bay (鯉魚門灣). In fact, the place where the current Promenade along the shoreline it was once a beach. The rest of the quarry was abolished by the Hong Kong Government, and there were still traces of it left before the establishment of the Hong Kong Museum of Coastal Defense. In the early 1980s, the Island line of the MTR was built, the working name of the station was "Chai Wan Quay" on the Freeman, Fox, Wilbur Smith & Associates Mass Transportation Study became Heng Fa Chuen when the MTR became the rightful developer of the land on top of the station and depot. Not only was the name of the station changed, but also it was relocated to its present place (The old location is currently situated near the Chai Wan pier/Ming Pao Industrial Centre).

Reclamation of the 15-hectare site began in 1978. To increase the development potential, the airport height limit on the site was raised from 30.48 metres above principal datum to 60 metres on 7 September 1984. The main architect of the development was Simon Kwan and Associates, while the main contractor was Carson Construction.

Heng Fa Chuen was jointly developed by the Mass Transit Railway Corporation and the Heng Fa Chuen Development Company Limited. The latter was a consortium comprising Kerry Trading, Kiu Kwong Investment Corporation (associated with the Bank of China), and Riverkent Limited. All of the residential blocks are managed by MTR Property Management.

The first 448 flats went on sale and were all sold on the evening of 25 July 1985. By 1986, the first 17 blocks of Heng Fa Chuen (all directly above the railway depot) were being completed and handed over to the owners. The remaining 31 blocks, which sit at grade closer to Victoria Harbour, were completed a few years later.

== Features ==
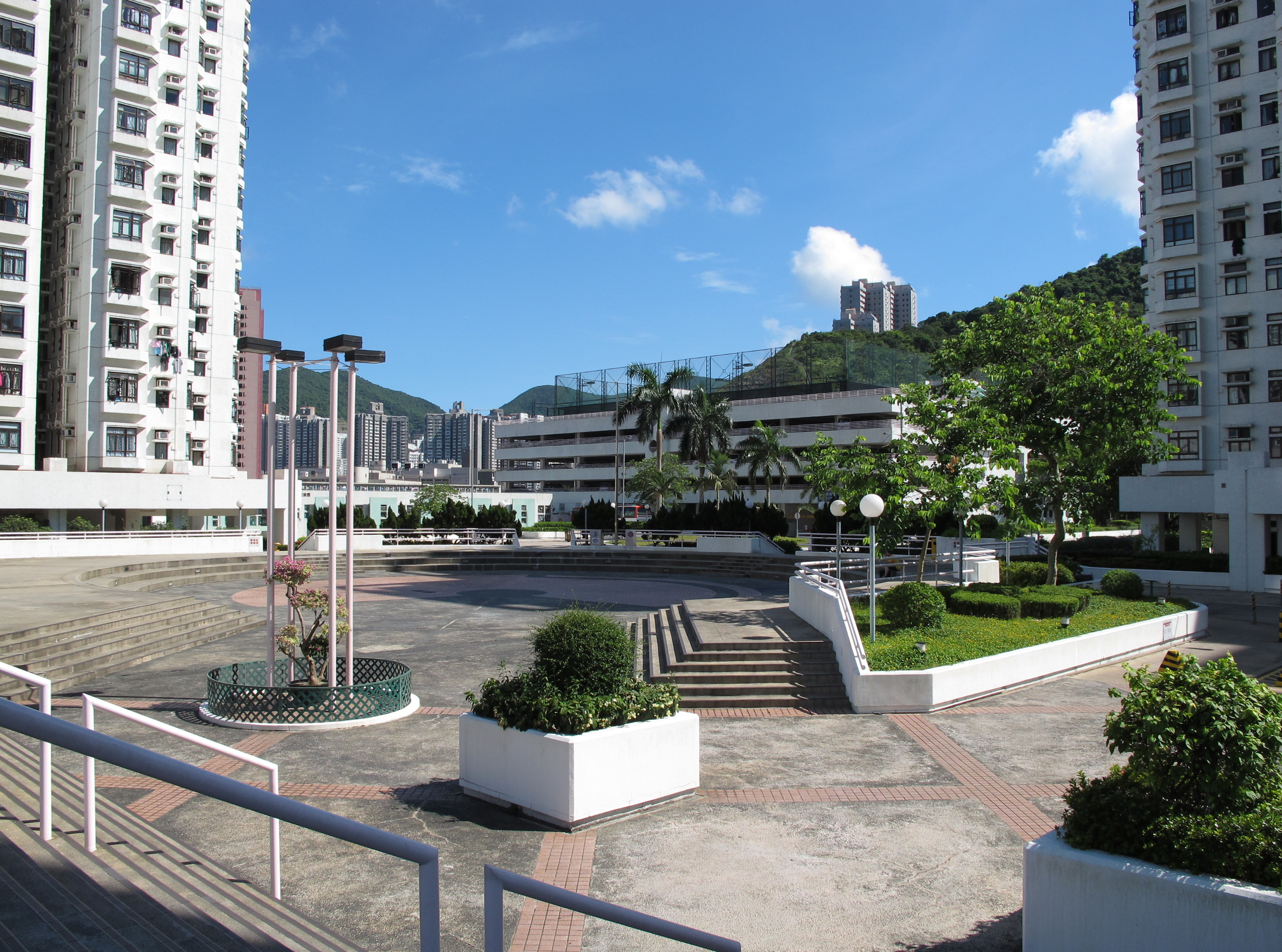
Heng Fa Chuen Residential Podium

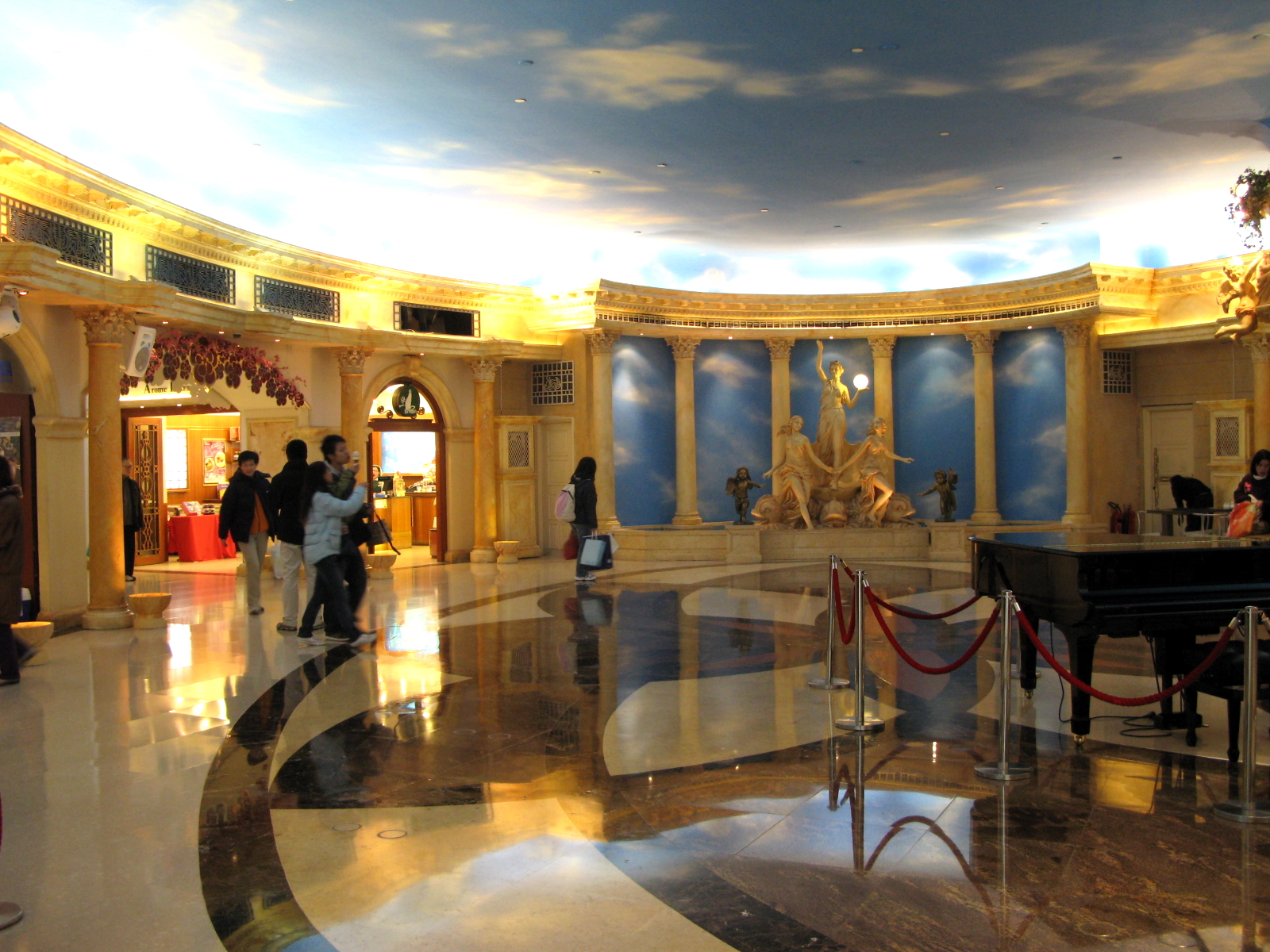
Paradise Mall Shopping Arcade before the 2018 renovation, with the theme of European Renaissance shown in the fountain and surrounding decorations.

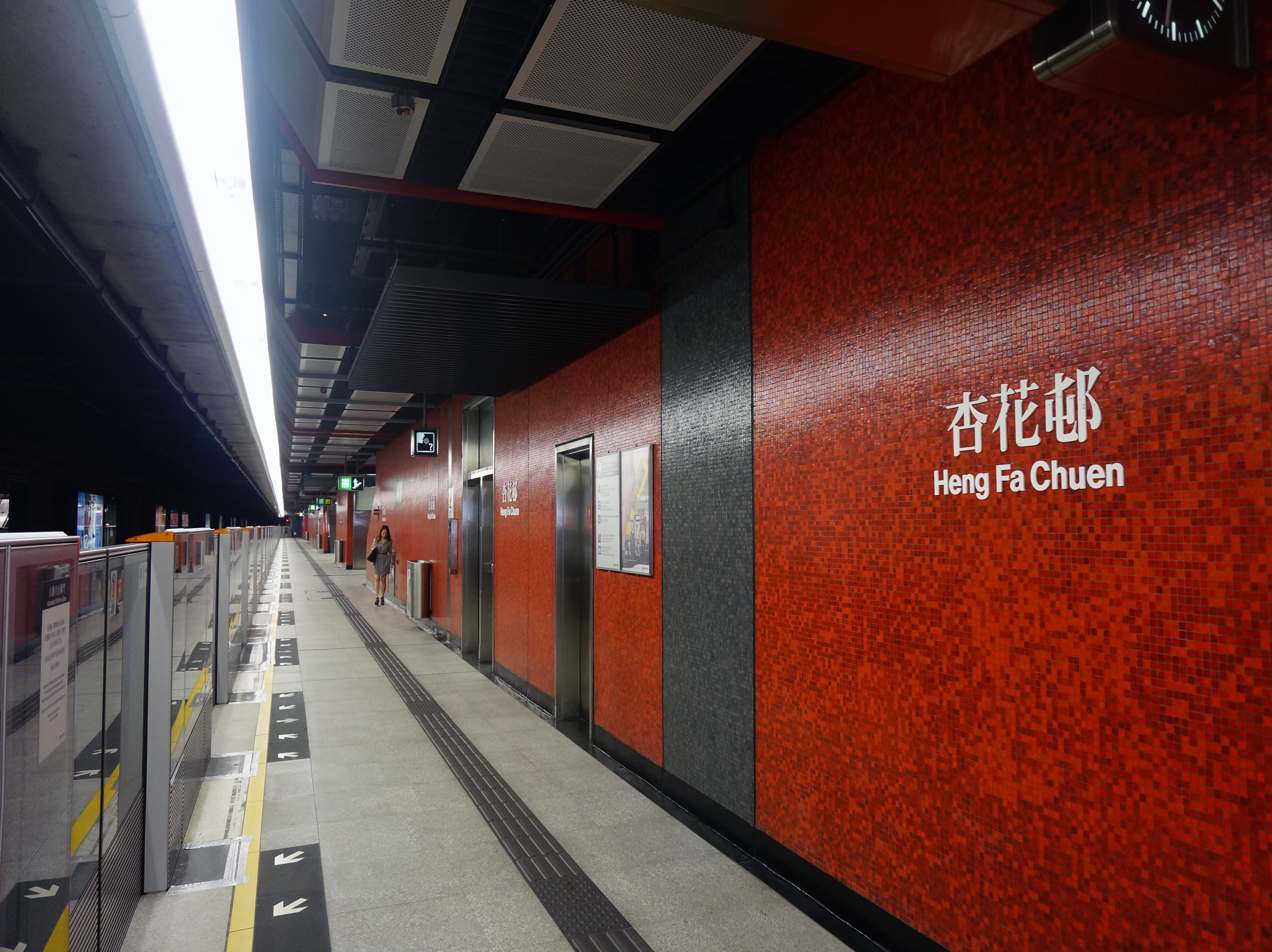
The Heng Fa Chuen station of the MTR

=== Housing ===
There are a total of 48 residential blocks, numbered 1 through 50 (numbers 14 and 44 are omitted due to tetraphobia in Cantonese). The first phase of the development featured 20-storied complexes, while the second phase featured 21-storied complexes. The comparatively low height of the towers was due to their location in the flight path of most planes using the former Hong Kong International Airport at Kai Tak.

=== Commerce ===
The Paradise Mall shopping centre opened in 1987. It underwent a total renovation in early 2018, changing its theme, especially on the ground floor, from the European Renaissance style to a more sports-oriented style. Together with the renovation, the "Paradise Mall" also positioned itself as an outlet with well-known sports brands attracting people from outside Heng Fa Chuen.

The world's 11,000th McDonald's fast-food restaurant was opened at Heng Fa Chuen in 1989.

In 2000, a PARKnSHOP supermarket replaced the existing Carrefour giant chain supermarket. This Carrefour store, which had opened in December 1996, had been the first one opened in Hong Kong.

=== Amenities ===
There is a recreation centre near blocks 32 and 33, with two swimming pools, a gym, and a restaurant.

== Demographics ==
The development has a total of 6,504 flats. It had a population of 18,921 in 2011.

== Education ==
Heng Fa Chuen has one secondary school, two primary schools, and four kindergartens:

- Lingnan Secondary School (嶺南中學)
- The Salvation Army Ann Wyllie Memorial Primary School (救世軍韋理夫人紀念學校)
- The C. & M. A. Scholars' Kindergarten (上書房中英文幼稚園)
- St. Dominic Kindergarten (聖道明幼稚園)
- The Creative Kindergarten (啟思幼稚園)
- The Ruth Kindergarten (路德會Education Bureau幼稚園)

Heng Fa Chuen is in Primary One Admission (POA) School Net 16. Within the school net are multiple aided schools (operated independently but funded with government money) and two government schools: Shau Kei Wan Government Primary School and Aldrich Bay Government Primary School.

== Transport ==
Heng Fa Chuen is served by the station of its namesake on the MTR Island line. Blocks 1 to 18 are situated on a podium above the MTR Chai Wan Depot, which houses and maintains the trains serving the line.

There is a bus terminus opposite residential blocks 49 and 50, serving route 8 to Wan Chai, route 85 to Braemar Hill (late evening trips are to North Point Ferry Pier), rush-hour only route 118P to Cheung Sha Wan via the Cross-Harbour Tunnel and rush-hour only route 608P to Kai Tak via the Eastern Harbour Tunnel. There are two green minibus routes (62 and 62A) between Heng Fa Chuen and Siu Sai Wan.

== See also ==
- List of buildings and structures in Hong Kong
- List of places in Hong Kong
