= Hong Kong Museum of the War of Resistance and Coastal Defence =

Military museum in Hong Kong

Coordinates: 22°16′55″N 114°14′8″E

- 香港抗戰及海防博物館

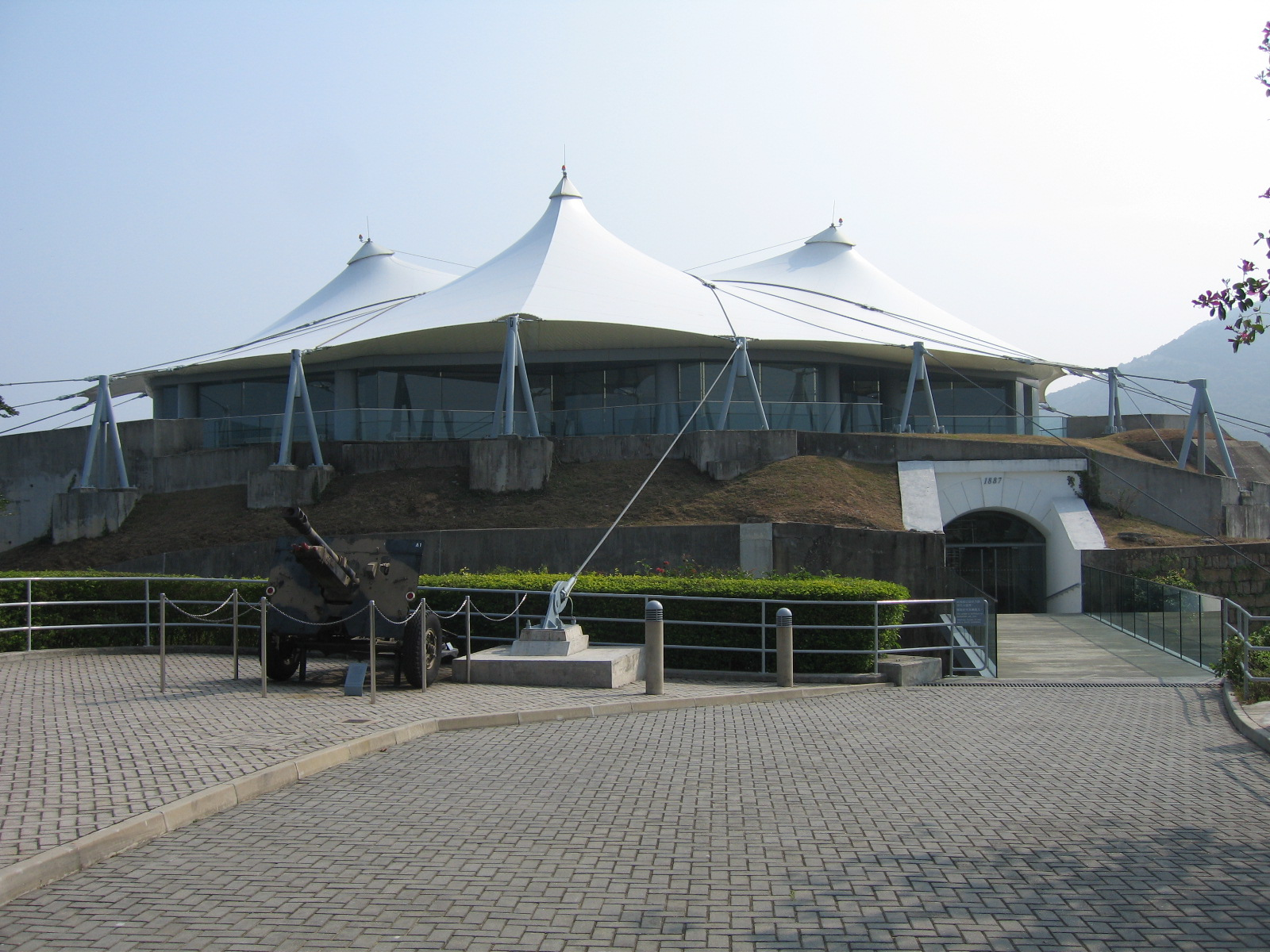
- The general view of Hong Kong Museum of the War of Resistance and Coastal Defence, before entering the neo-classical arch entrance
- Former name: Hong Kong Museum of Coastal Defence
- Established: 25 July 2000; 26 years ago
- Location: 175 Tung Hei Road, Shau Kei Wan, Hong Kong
- Type: Public
- Collections: Military
- Collection size: Over 400
- Director: Terence Cheung Yui-fai
- Curator: Rebecca Cheung Nga-yan
- Owner: Leisure and Cultural Services Department
- Public transit access: Shau Kei Wan station (Exit B2)
- Website: hk.waranddefence.museum

Hong Kong Museum of the War of Resistance and Coastal Defence
- Traditional Chinese: 香港抗戰及海防博物館
- Simplified Chinese: 香港抗战及海防博物馆
Transcriptions
Standard Mandarin
- Hanyu Pinyin: Xiānggǎng Kàngzhàn jí Hǎifáng Bówùguǎn
Yue: Cantonese
- Jyutping: Hoeng1 gong2 kong3 zin3 kap6 hoi2 fong4 bok3 mat6 gun2

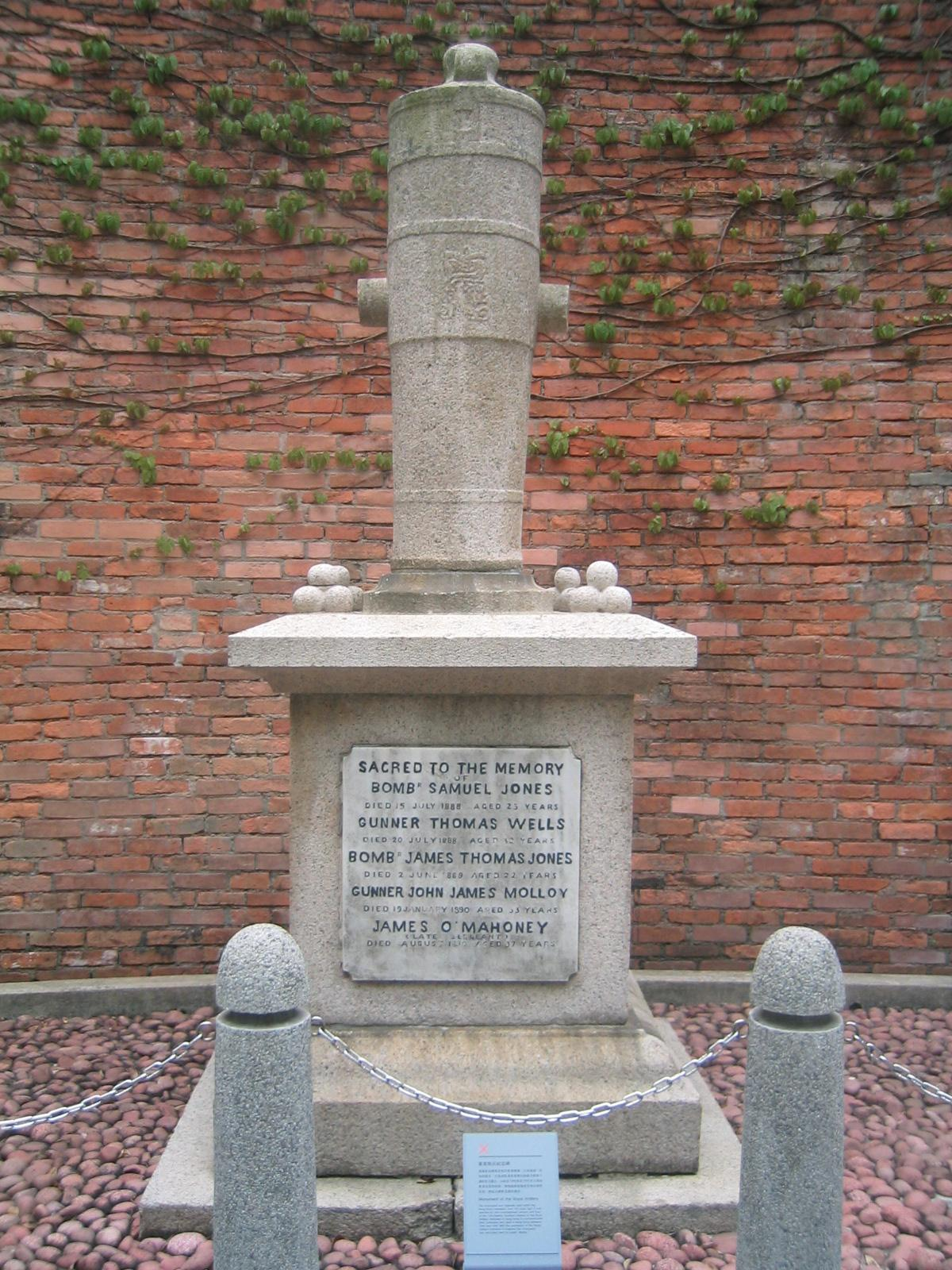
A memorial dedicated to several British soldiers

The Hong Kong Museum of the War of Resistance and Coastal Defence (HKMWRCD), formerly known as the Hong Kong Museum of Coastal Defence (HKMCD), is a public museum in Hong Kong, located in a former coastal defence fort overlooking the Lei Yue Mun channel, near Shau Kei Wan on Hong Kong Island. The fort was built by the British in 1887, intended to defend the eastern approaches to Victoria Harbour. It was previously a branch museum of the Hong Kong Museum of History.

The total area of the HKMWRCD is 34,200 square metres (368,000 ft^{2}). An exhibition entitled "600 years of Coastal Defence" is held permanently in the museum, which tells the story of the defence of the Hong Kong coastline from the time of the Ming dynasty, through the First and Second Opium Wars and the Battle of Hong Kong, through to today.

On 3 September 2024, the museum was renamed to the Hong Kong Museum of the War of Resistance and Coastal Defence. The date marked the anniversary of Japanese surrender in World War II as commemorated in China.

== Site history ==
On 8 December 1941, the Japanese launched their attacks on Hong Kong Island. After the fall of the New Territories and Kowloon, the British Forces immediately strengthened the defences at Lei Yue Mun to prevent the Japanese from crossing the Lei Yue Mun Channel from Devil's Peak. The defence forces managed to repulse several raids by the Japanese, but were eventually overwhelmed and the fort fell into enemy hands on 19 December. The fort no longer bore any defensive significance in the post-war period and became a training ground for the British Forces until 1987, when it was finally vacated.

== Creating the museum ==
In 1993 the Urban Council decided to convert the fort into a museum, and on 25 July 2000 the HKMCD was opened. In September 2018, the museum was closed for four years for repairs and renovation work after Super Typhoon Mangkhut. It was reopened on 24 November 2022. After renaming to its present name on 3 September 2024, the HKMWRCD began including a newly added gallery with regular exhibitions on the War of Resistance, in partnership with cultural institutions in mainland China.

== Displays ==
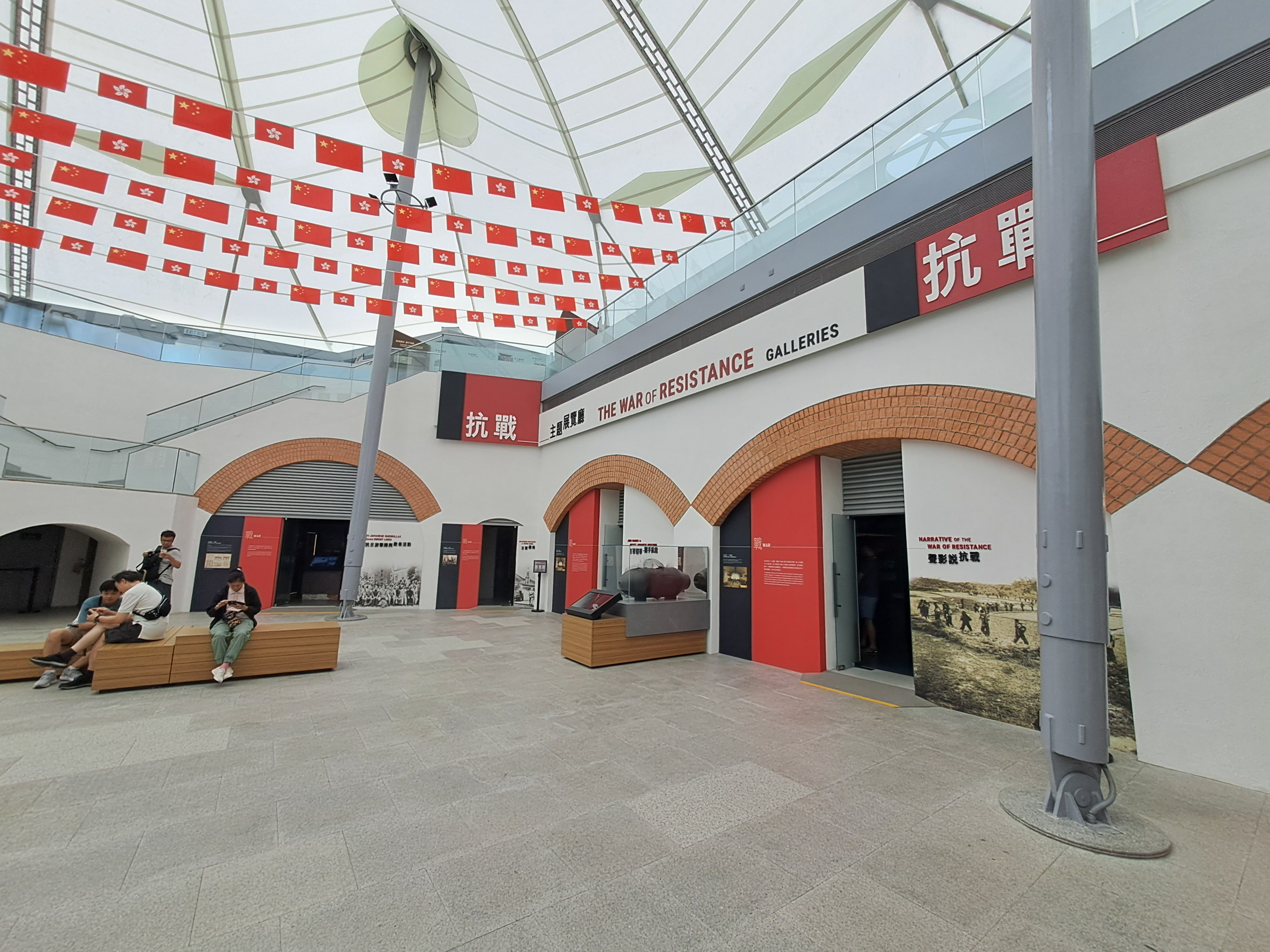
Museum interior

The HKMWRCD consists of three main areas, namely the Reception area, the Redoubt, and the Historical Trail. It is converted from the hundred-year-old Lei Yue Mun Fort. Its historical structure has an extensive outdoor area with the unique architectural design, a strong tensile structure with other traditional building material, which provides a comfort and historical feeling for visitors.

The casemates inside the Redoubt were converted into exhibition galleries for permanent displays on the history of Hong Kong's Coastal Defence covering the Ming and Qing period, the British period, the Japanese invasion and the period after the transfer of sovereignty to China.

== Historical military structures ==
1. Redoubt: It was built in 1887 and formerly the core military structure of the Lei Yue Mun Fort.
2. Central Battery: This battery was completed in March 1887. The gun barrel on the display is a 7-inch (17.8 cm) RML Mark 1 gun of 4.5 tons dating from the 1870s.
3. Western Battery: Two 9 inch (23 cm) muzzle loading guns mounted in this battery in March 1887. The barrel displayed here, which was found in the Admiralty Garden site in 1990, alone weighed 12 tons.
4. The torpedo station: The Brennan Torpedo station at Lei Yue Mun was built between 1892 and 1894. It was hewn out of the rock of the headland. It was the last to be constructed either in Britain or her overseas possessions.
5. Lei Yue Mun Pass Battery: This battery was built to defend the harbour from destroyers carrying small high-speed torpedoes; it was completed in March 1892.

== Transportation ==
The museum is accessible by a 10-12 minute walk from Exit B2 of Shau Kei Wan Station.

== See also ==
- British Forces Overseas Hong Kong
- List of museums in Hong Kong
- Tensile structure
