= Heng Fa Chuen station =

MTR station on Hong Kong Island

Heng Fa Chuen 杏花邨
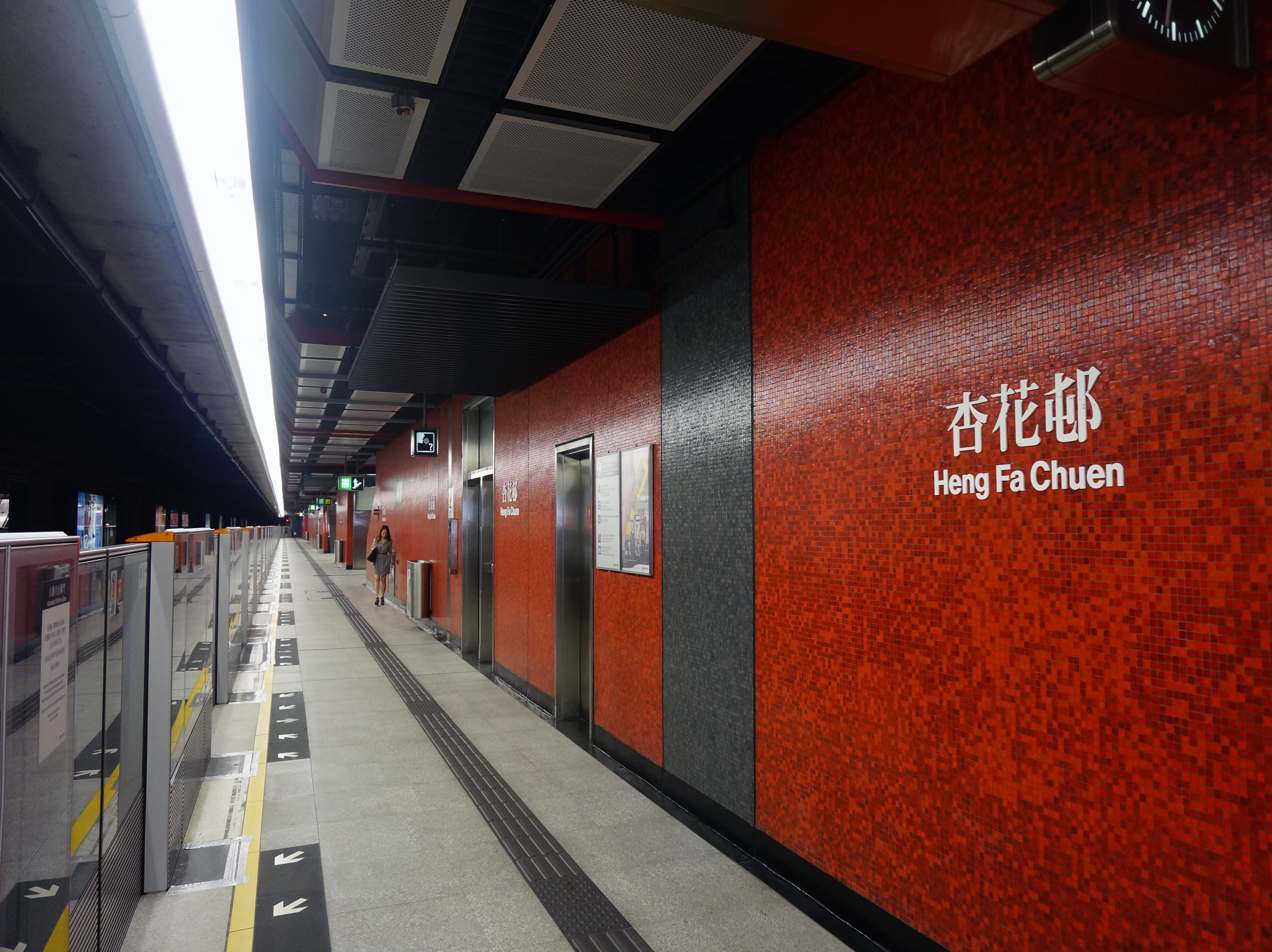
- Platform 1

Chinese name
- Chinese: 杏花邨
- Cantonese Yale: Hahngfāchyūn
- Literal meaning: Almond Flower Estate
Transcriptions
Standard Mandarin
- Hanyu Pinyin: Xìnghuācūn
Yue: Cantonese
- Yale Romanization: Hahngfāchyūn
- Jyutping: Hang6faa1cyun1

General information
- Location: Shing Tai Road, Heng Fa Chuen, Chai Wan; Eastern District, Hong Kong
- Coordinates: 22°16′37″N 114°14′23″E
- System: MTR rapid transit station
- Owner: MTR Corporation
- Operator: MTR Corporation
- Line: Island line
- Platforms: 2 side platforms
- Tracks: 2
- Connections: Bus, minibus

Construction
- Structure type: At-grade
- Platform levels: 1
- Accessible: Yes

Other information
- Station code: HFC

History
- Opened: 31 May 1985; 41 years ago
- Former names: Pak Sha Wan

Services
Preceding station	MTR	Following station
Shau Kei Wan towards Kennedy Town	Island line	Chai Wan Terminus
Proposed
Shau Kei Wan towards Kennedy Town	Island line	Siu Sai Wan Terminus
Track layout
Location
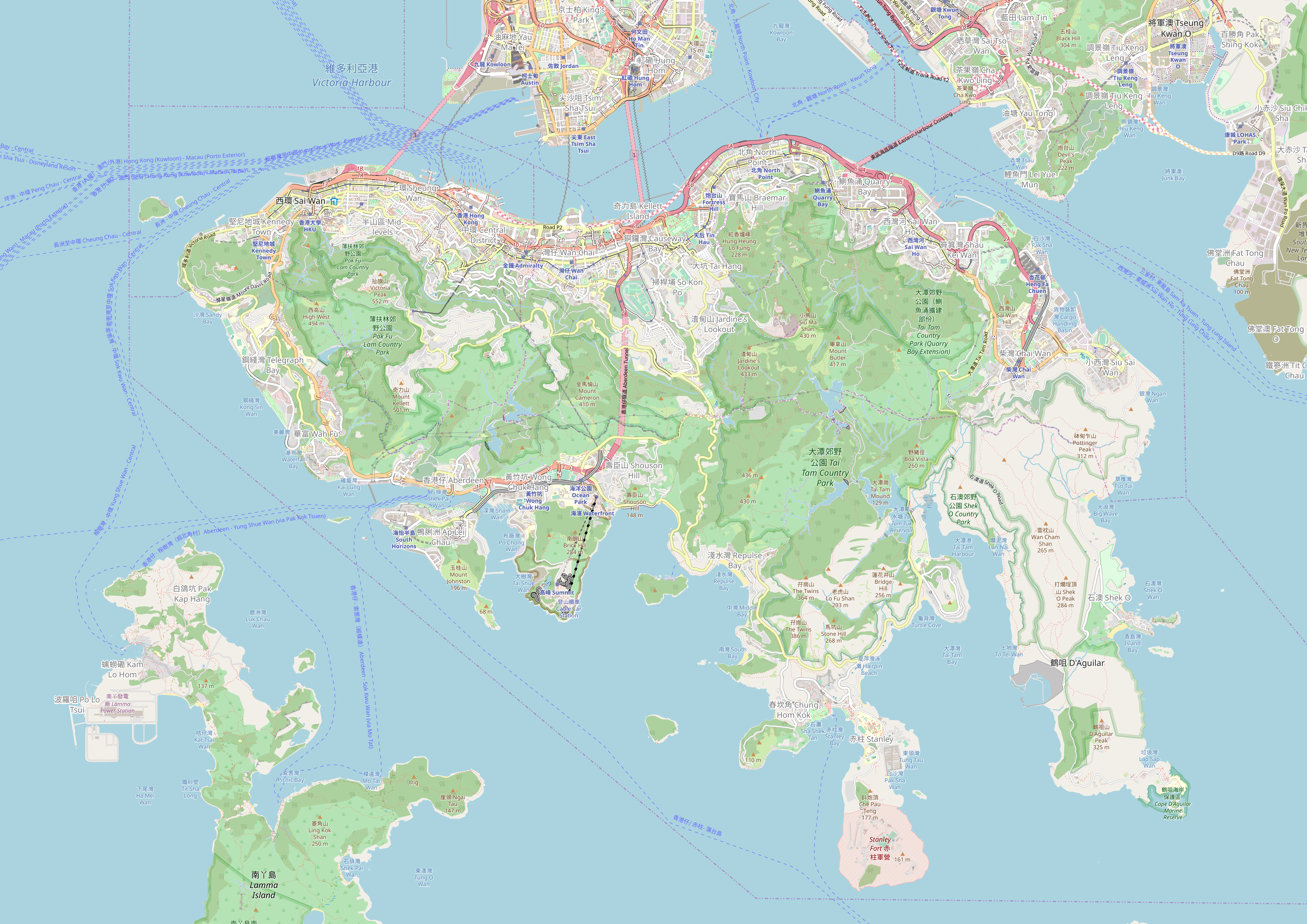
- Location within MTR Location within Hong Kong Island

Heng Fa Chuen is a station on the Island line of the MTR in Hong Kong. The station is located in the heart of the Heng Fa Chuen housing development. The livery of the station is vermillion.

It is the only station on the line that is on the ground level, and one of only two stations that are not underground. It is one of three Island line stations that have opposing side platforms, as opposed to island platforms or side platforms on different levels of a station. (The others are Sheung Wan and Kennedy Town stations.)

The MTR depot for the Island line, the Chai Wan Depot, is located to the northeast of the station. Automatic platform gates were installed in this station in April 2011.

Before the opening of the Tseung Kwan O line, Heng Fa Chuen station was the easternmost railway station in Hong Kong. It remains the easternmost station on Hong Kong Island. The next station on the eastbound of the line, Chai Wan station, which is also the eastern terminus of the line, is located to its west-southwest.

== History ==
Before opening on 31 May 1985, names proposed for this station included North Chai Wan (北柴灣站), Agonar or A Kung Ngam (阿公岩站), Chai Wan Quay (柴灣碼頭站), and Pak Sha Wan (白沙灣站). It was after the opening of phase one (of the Heng Fa Chuen development) that prompted the MTR to change the name to Heng Fa Chuen. This station was primarily used by construction workers in the early 1980s, during the construction of Heng Fa Chuen.

Construction of this station and the adjacent depot, built on newly reclaimed land, commenced in July 1982 under Island line contract 411, and was carried out by a joint venture formed by the Japanese contractors Aoki Corporation and Tobishima Corporation. The station building is made of cast-in-situ reinforced concrete and sits on a bored pile foundation. The station opened in May 1985 as part of the first phase of the Island line.

== Station layout ==
Both platforms 1 and 2 are located on ground level, with the rails running through the middle of the station. There is a wall with holes cut into it, separating the two tracks. Advertisements are displayed on this wall.

-	Residential Area	Heng Fa Chuen
U1	Concourse	Exits, Customer Service, Heng Fa Chuen, Paradise Mall
U1	Concourse	MTRShops, vending machines, ATM
G Platform	Shopping mall	Paradise Mall
G Platform	Side platform, doors will open on the left
G Platform	Platform 1	Island line towards Chai Wan (Terminus) →
G Platform	Platform 2	← Island line towards Kennedy Town (Shau Kei Wan)
G Platform	Side platform, doors will open on the left
G Platform	Depot	MTR Chai Wan Depot

== Shops ==
- Circle K Mini-store
- Hang Seng Bank ATMs
- Maxim's Cakes
- A Bank of China (Hong Kong) ATM

== Entrances/exits ==
- A1: Paradise Mall (West)
- A2: Paradise Mall (East)
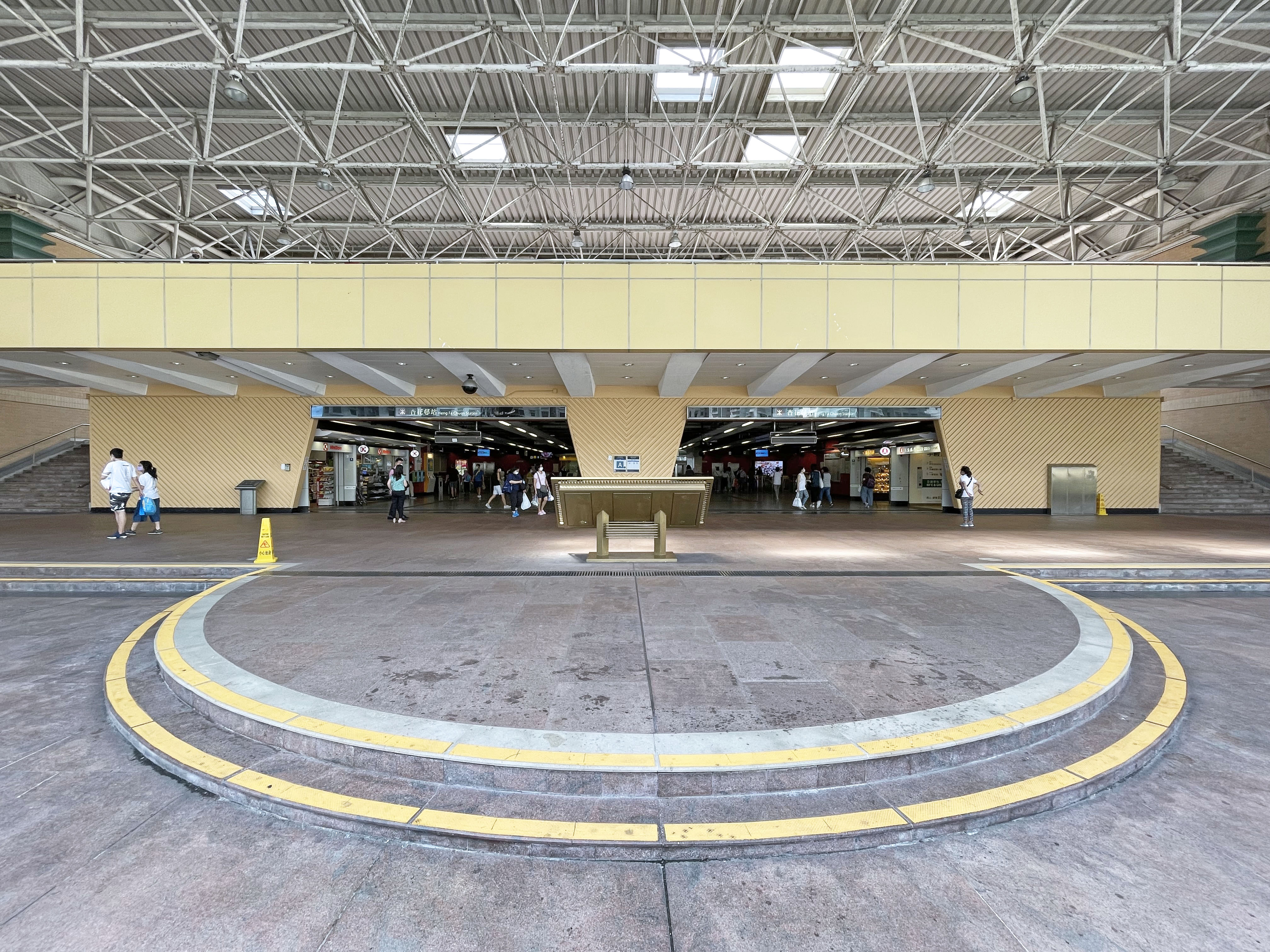
  Exit

== See also ==
- Hong Kong Institute of Vocational Education (Chai Wan Campus)
