= Chai Wan station =

MTR station on Hong Kong Island

Chai Wan 柴灣
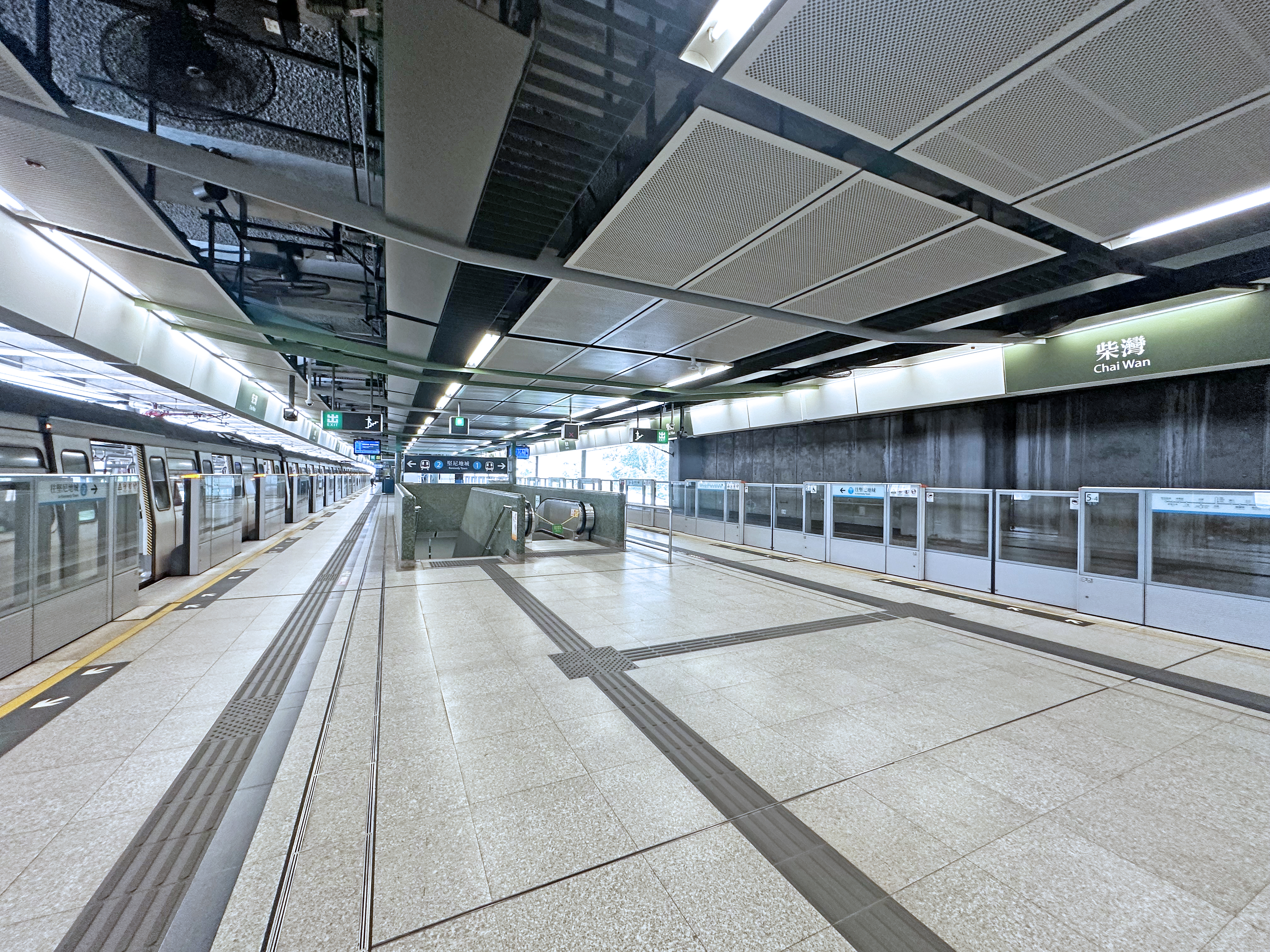
- Both platforms of Chai Wan station

Chinese name
- Traditional Chinese: 柴灣
- Simplified Chinese: 柴湾
- Hanyu Pinyin: Cháiwān
- Cantonese Yale: Chàaiwāan
- Literal meaning: Firewood Bay
Transcriptions
Standard Mandarin
- Hanyu Pinyin: Cháiwān
Yue: Cantonese
- Yale Romanization: Chàaiwāan
- IPA: Cháiwān
- Jyutping: Caai4waan1

General information
- Location: Kut Shing Street, Chai Wan; Eastern District, Hong Kong
- Coordinates: 22°15′52″N 114°14′12″E
- System: MTR rapid transit station
- Operator: MTR Corporation
- Line: Island line
- Platforms: 2 (1 island platform)
- Tracks: 2
- Connections: Bus, minibus

Construction
- Structure type: Elevated
- Platform levels: 1
- Accessible: Yes

Other information
- Station code: CHW

History
- Opened: 31 May 1985; 41 years ago

Services
Preceding station	MTR	Following station
Heng Fa Chuen towards Kennedy Town	Island line	Terminus
Track layout
Location
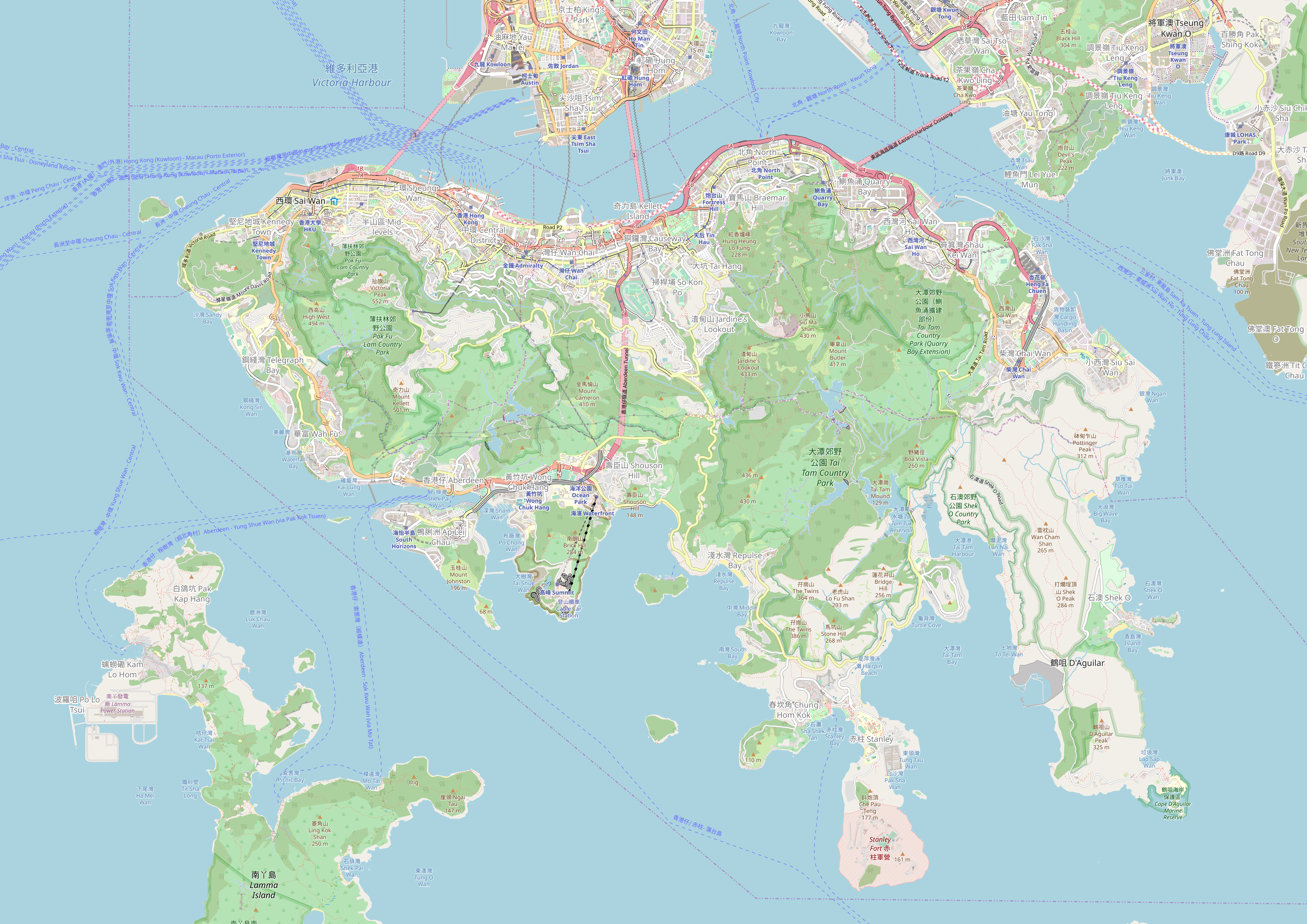
- Location within MTR Location within Hong Kong Island

Chai Wan (Chinese: 柴灣) is the eastern terminus of the MTR Island line on Hong Kong Island, Hong Kong. It is the only station on the Island line that is elevated. The station is located at the junction of Chai Wan Road and Island Eastern Corridor, and serves Siu Sai Wan and Chai Wan, a primarily residential and industrial town. The bus terminus nearby has bus and minibus routes to Siu Sai Wan and Stanley, as well as the nearby residential developments. Chai Wan was also the southernmost railway station in Hong Kong, prior to the opening of Lei Tung station on the South Island line on 28 December 2016.

There were no platform screen doors when this station was opened, but the MTR Corporation has retrofitted automatic platform gates on both platforms in 2011.

Its livery is deep green.

== History ==
The station was built on part of Chai Wan Park and the site of a pre-existing minibus terminus. Construction commenced in July 1982 and was carried out by the British contractor George Wimpey. The foundation is formed by hand-dug caissons, while the structure comprises reinforced concrete poured in situ. Over 11,000 cubic metres of concrete was poured.

It opened on 31 May 1985 as part of the first phase of the Island line.

== Station layout ==
U2; Platforms	Platform 1	← Island line towards Kennedy Town (Heng Fa Chuen)
U2; Platforms	Island platform, doors will open on the left, right
U2; Platforms	Platform 2	← Island line towards Kennedy Town (Heng Fa Chuen)
U1	Concourse	Customer Service, MTRShops
U1	Concourse	Hang Seng Bank, vending machines, automatic teller machines
G	Street level	Exits, transport interchange

Passengers from Chai Wan going to Kennedy Town can board trains on either platforms. The platform from which a train will leave first is indicated on a display board.

An overrun track is present to allow trains to stop and reverse direction if they travel beyond Chai Wan station. However, this set of tracks is rarely used, as trains arriving at Chai Wan station leave for Kennedy Town by pulling out of the same platform.

As this station is close to Chai Wan depot, after peak hours, some Island Line trains will suspend services and return to Chai Wan depot after clearing passengers at this station. The first signal will be sounded when the train enters the station. At the same time, the platform will make an announcement before the train arrives and when the train enters the station. After the train arrives, the second signal will be sounded before the doors are opened and passengers are dropped off. The destination display screen Depot will be displayed, and the platform display will show that this train is not carrying passengers, so that waiting passengers know that the train will not carry passengers when it arrives at the station. Before the train closes the door and leaves the station, the red and blue signal lights at the west end of the platform will light up with the word DP (meaning Depot) in white, and the horn will sound again, and it will drive directly back to Chai Wan Depot.

The same thing will happen after the last train to Chai Wan arrives here.

=== Entrances and exits ===
- A: New Jade Gardens, Chai Wan Industrial Area, Cape Collinson - San Ha Columbarium, Siu Sai Wan
- B: Cheung Lee Street
- C: Public transport interchange
- D: Ning Foo Street
- E: Hing Wah Estate
