= Kennedy Town station =

MTR station on Hong Kong Island

Kennedy Town 堅尼地城
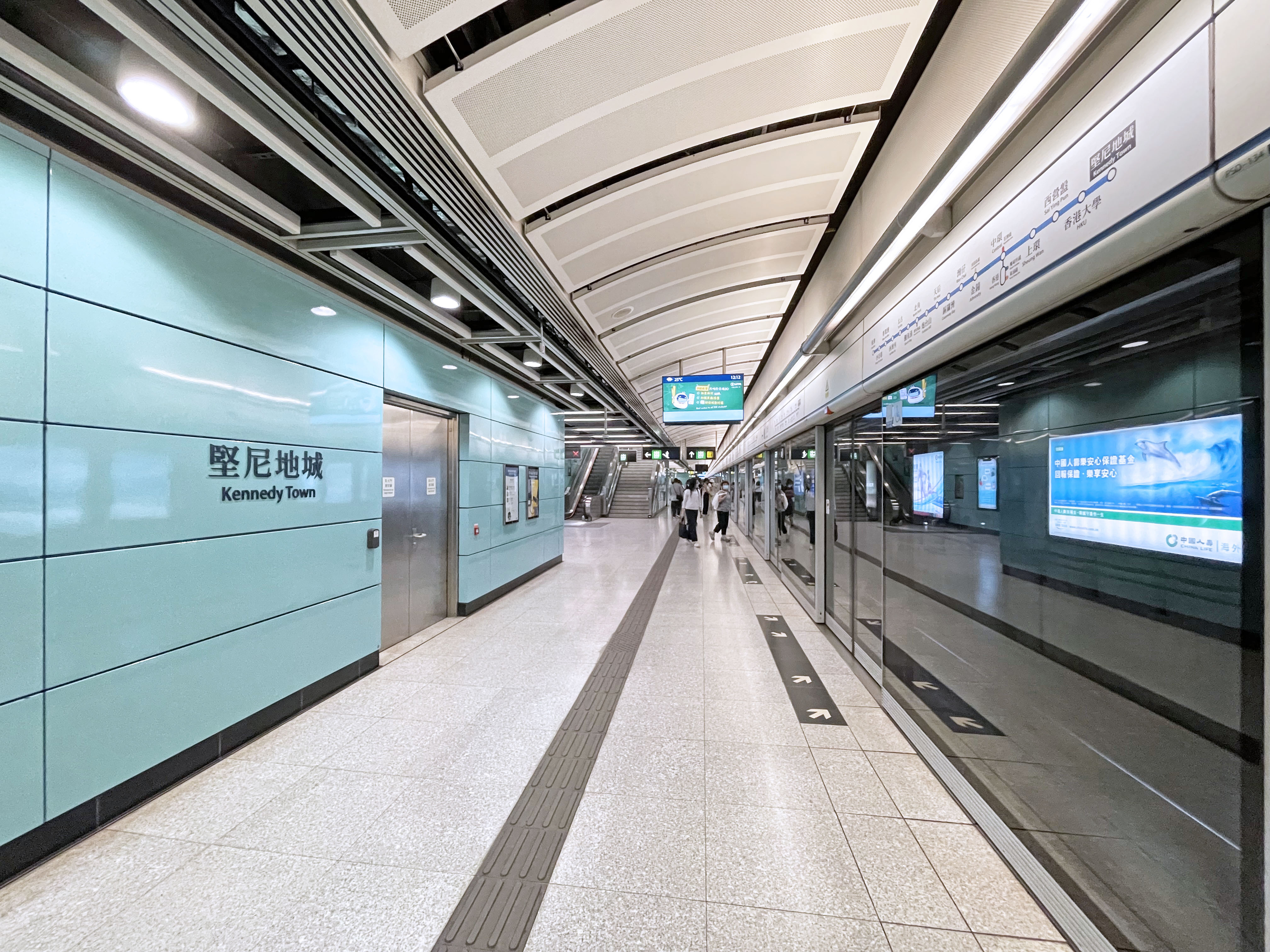
- Platform 1

Chinese name
- Traditional Chinese: 堅尼地城
- Simplified Chinese: 坚尼地城
- Literal meaning: Kennedy City
Transcriptions
Standard Mandarin
- Hanyu Pinyin: Jiānnídì Chéng
Yue: Cantonese
- Yale Romanization: gin1 nei4 dei6 sing4
- IPA: [kʰíːn lȅi tʰèi ɕɪ̏ŋ]
- Jyutping: gin1 nei4 dei6 sing4

General information
- Location: Smithfield/Forbes Street, Kennedy Town; Central and Western District, Hong Kong
- Coordinates: 22°16′52″N 114°07′43″E
- System: MTR rapid transit station
- Operator: MTR Corporation
- Line: Island line
- Platforms: 2 side platforms
- Tracks: 2
- Connections: Tram; Bus, minibus

Construction
- Structure type: Underground
- Platform levels: 1
- Accessible: Yes
- Architect: Farrells

Other information
- Station code: KET

History
- Opened: 28 December 2014; 11 years ago
- Former names: Kennedy

Services
| Preceding station | MTR | Following station |
|---|---|---|
| Terminus | Island line | HKU towards Chai Wan |
Track layout
Location
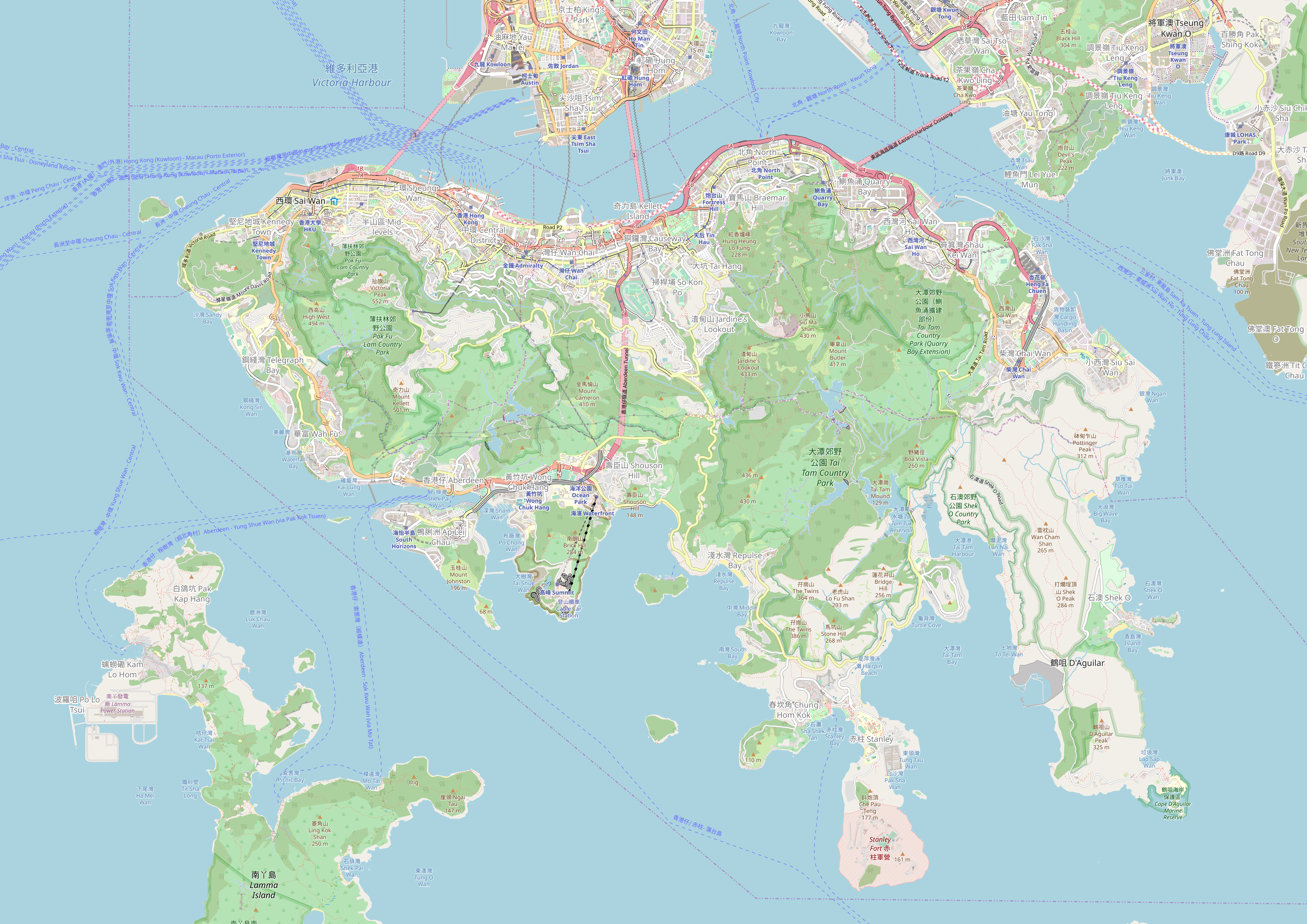
- Location within MTR Location within Hong Kong Island

Kennedy Town (Chinese: 堅尼地城) is the western terminus of the Island line. The station serves the Kennedy Town area on the northwestern end of Hong Kong Island, Hong Kong. Its livery is pale turquoise.

== History ==
=== Planning ===
When the station first appeared in Hong Kong Mass Transit: Further Studies plan in 1970, it was simply known as Kennedy (堅尼地; gin1 nei4 dei6). It was to be built as part of the Island line in the 1980s, but construction of the line did not commence westwards beyond Sheung Wan, on account of contractors citing inadequate passenger numbers and technical difficulties.

Under the latest proposal as of June 2005, Kennedy Town would be served by West Island line as an extension of the Island line, a heavy rail system, instead of being served by a medium capacity rail shared by commuters from Southern District, after pressure from local community groups.

=== Construction ===
The station was designed by TFP Farrells. The contract to construct the station and overrun tunnel was awarded to Gammon Construction (half owned by Balfour Beatty) for HK$1.34 billion. The overrun tunnel is 650 metres in length. Construction commenced in 2010 and was completed in 2014. Demolition of the swimming pool, which occupied the bulk of the station site, was underway by 2011. The re-provisioning contract for the new Kennedy Town Swimming Pool was awarded to Paul Y. Construction Company Ltd in July 2009 and was finished in 2011 near the Kennedy Town seafront.

Kennedy Town station opened on 28 December 2014.

== Station layout ==
The station is located under the site of the previous Kennedy Town Swimming Pool located on Smithfield. There is a public transport interchange at the ground level of the station.

West of the station, the two tracks merge into one track and there is a siding for Island line trains to change direction.

| G | Ground level | Exits/Entrances, public transport interchange |
| C | Concourse | Customer Service, MTRShops |
| P Platforms | Side platform, doors will open on the left |
| P Platforms | Platform 1 | Island line towards Chai Wan (HKU) → |
| P Platforms | Platform 2 | ← Island line termination platform |
| P Platforms | Side platform, doors will open on the left |

== Entrances/exits ==
- A: Smithfield (Minibus terminus)
- B: Rock Hill Street, North Street
- C: Forbes Street, Smithfield, Kennedy Town Playground
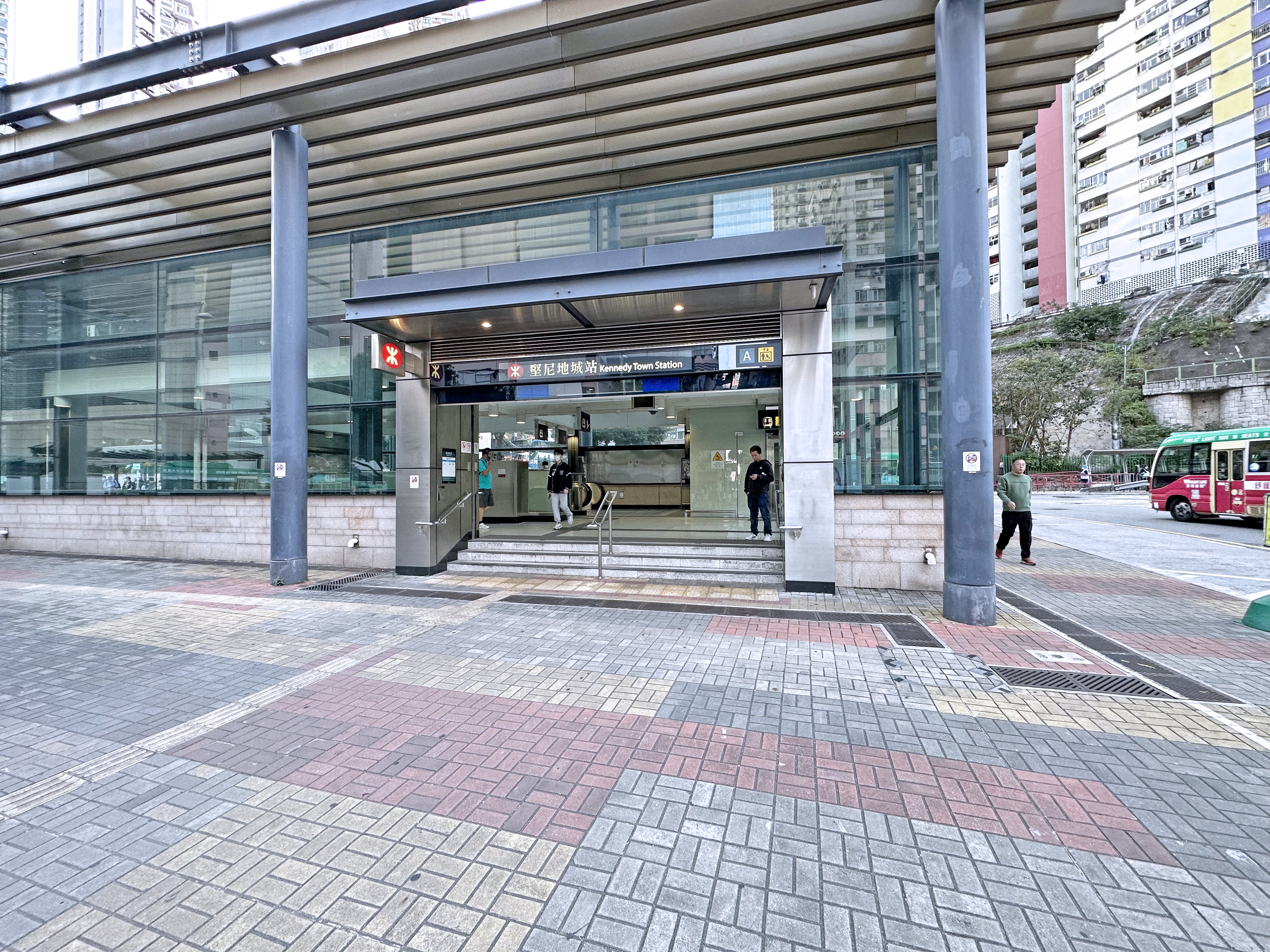
Entrance & Exit A

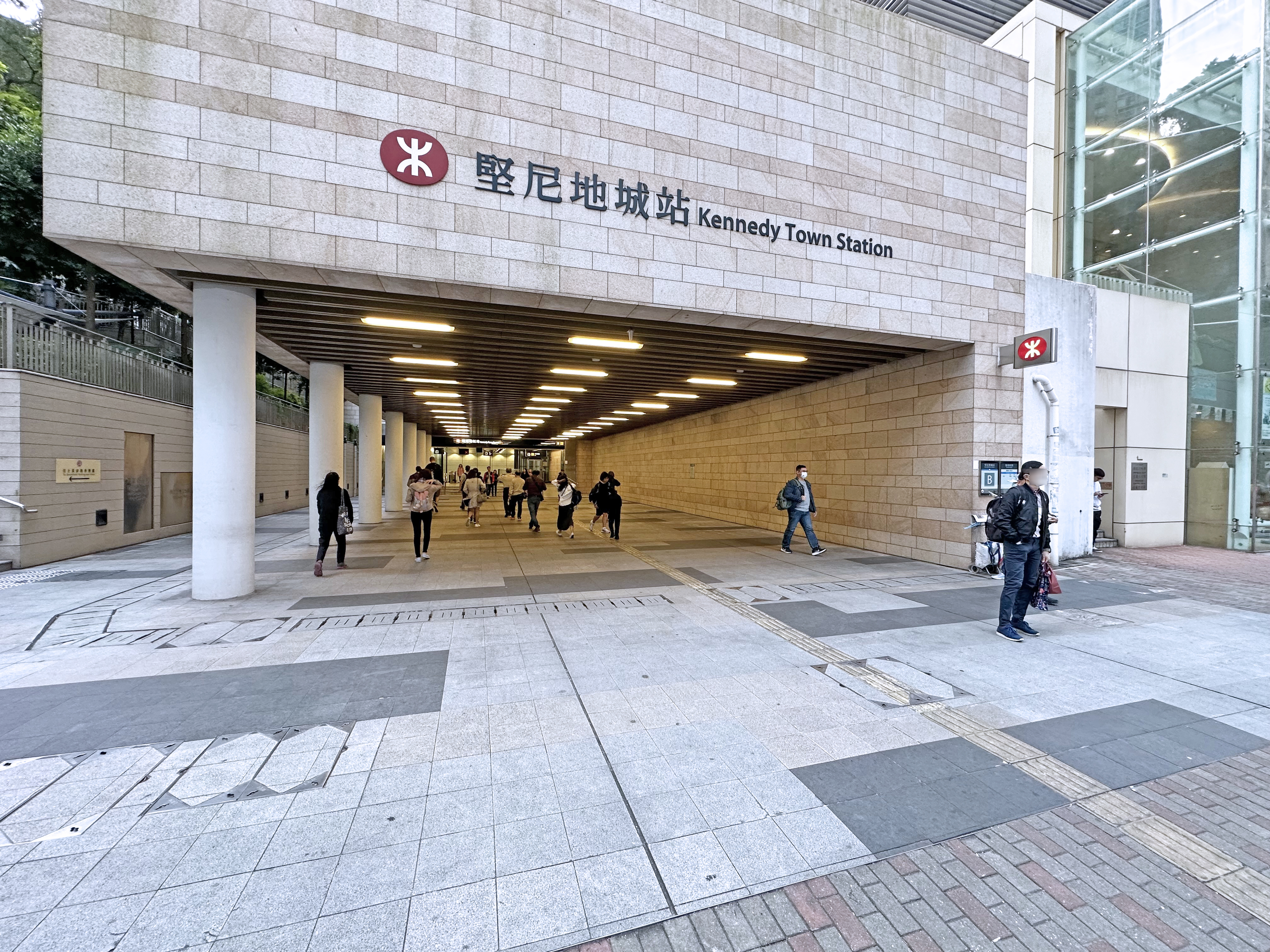
Entrance & Exit B

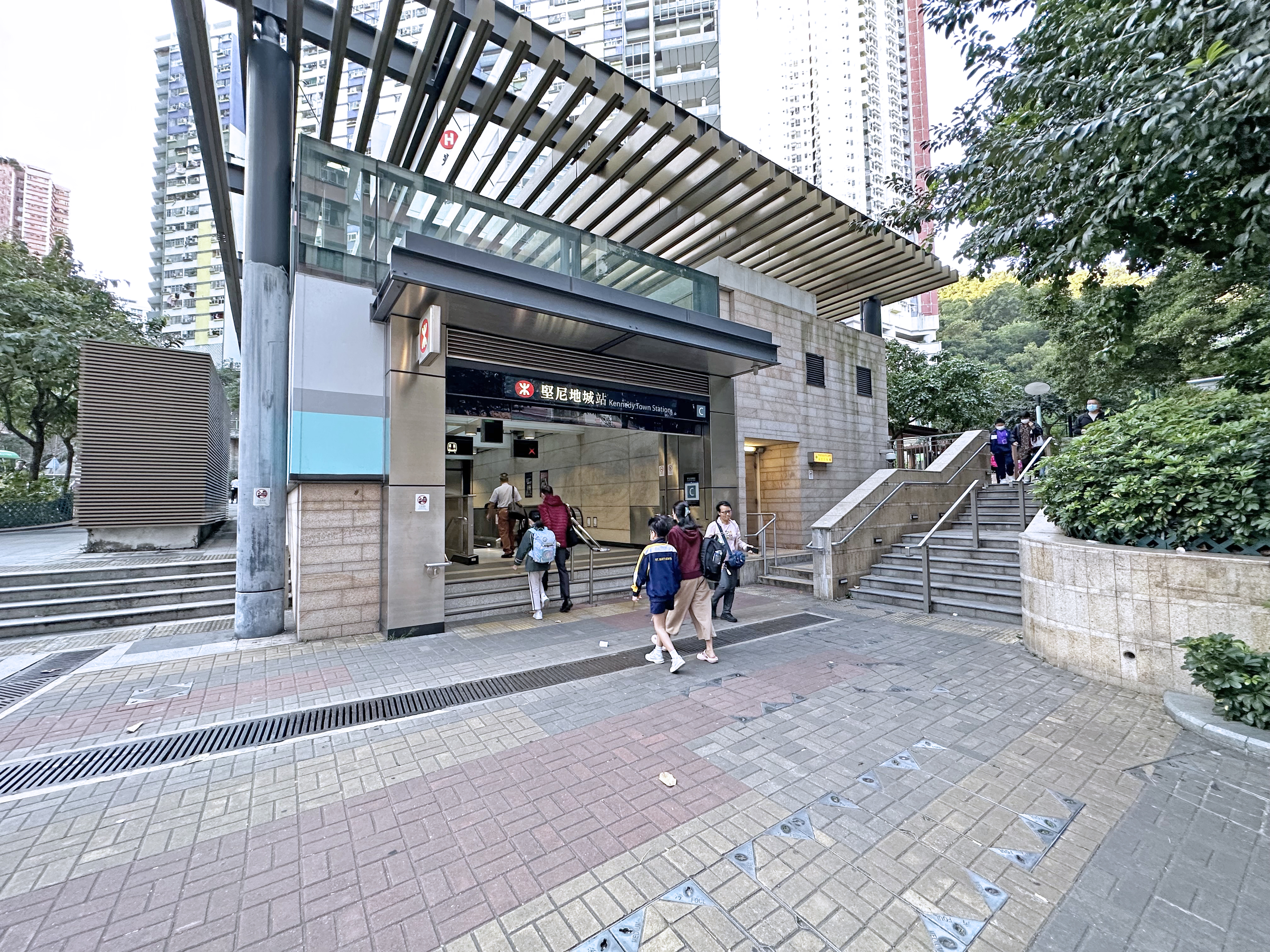
Entrance & Exit C

== Community facilities ==
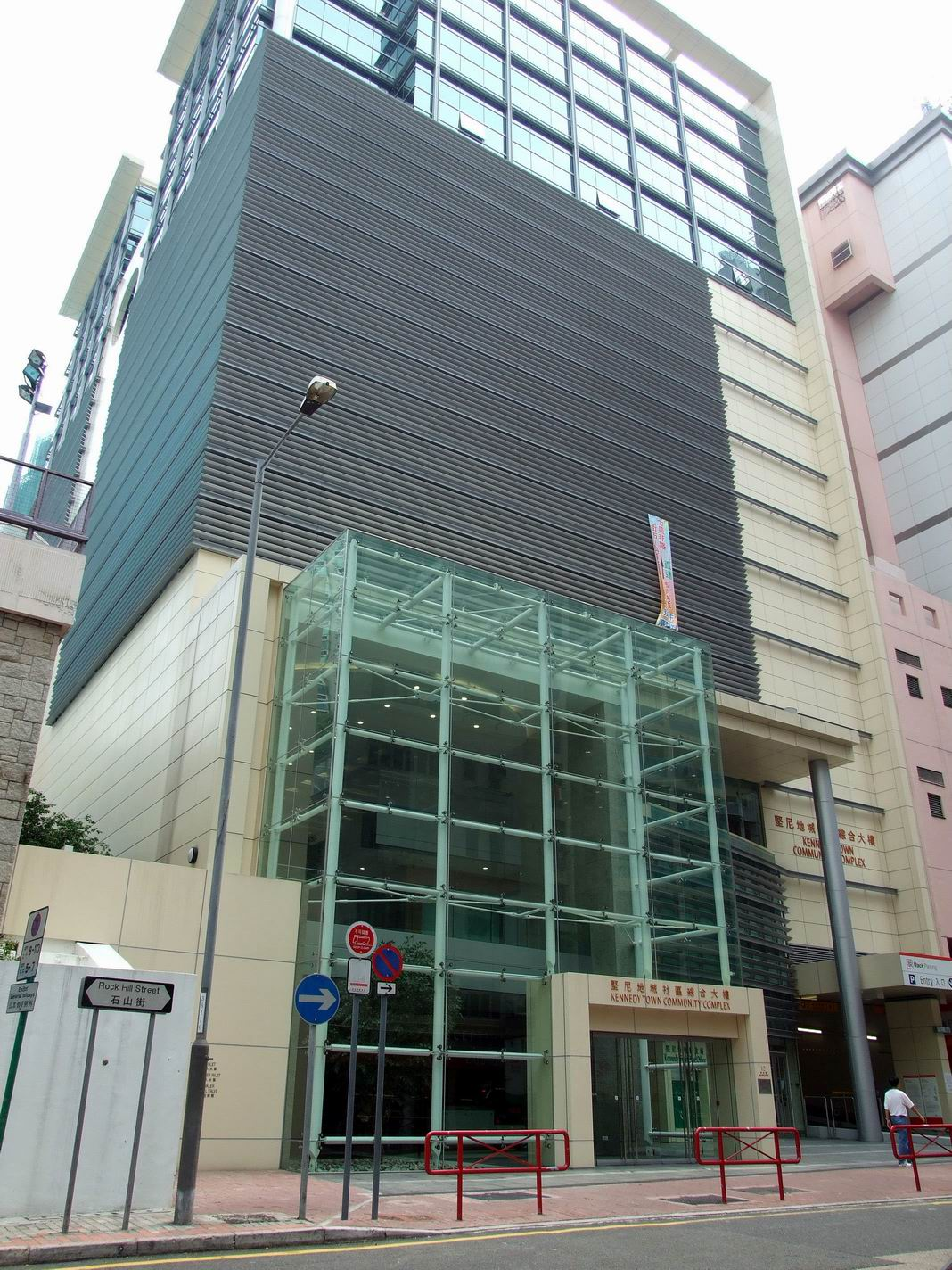
Kennedy Town Community Complex

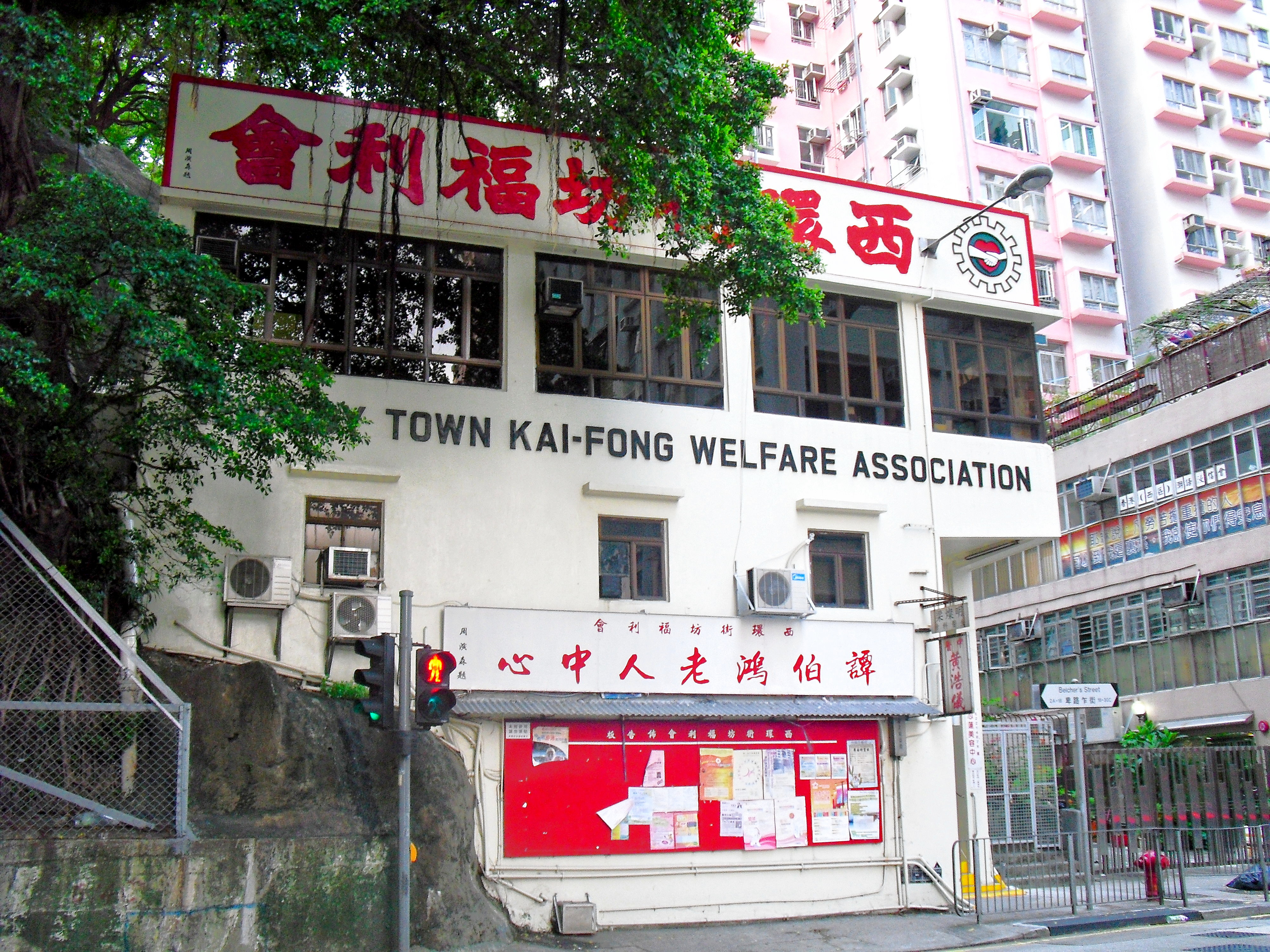
Kennedy Town Kai-Fong Welfare Association

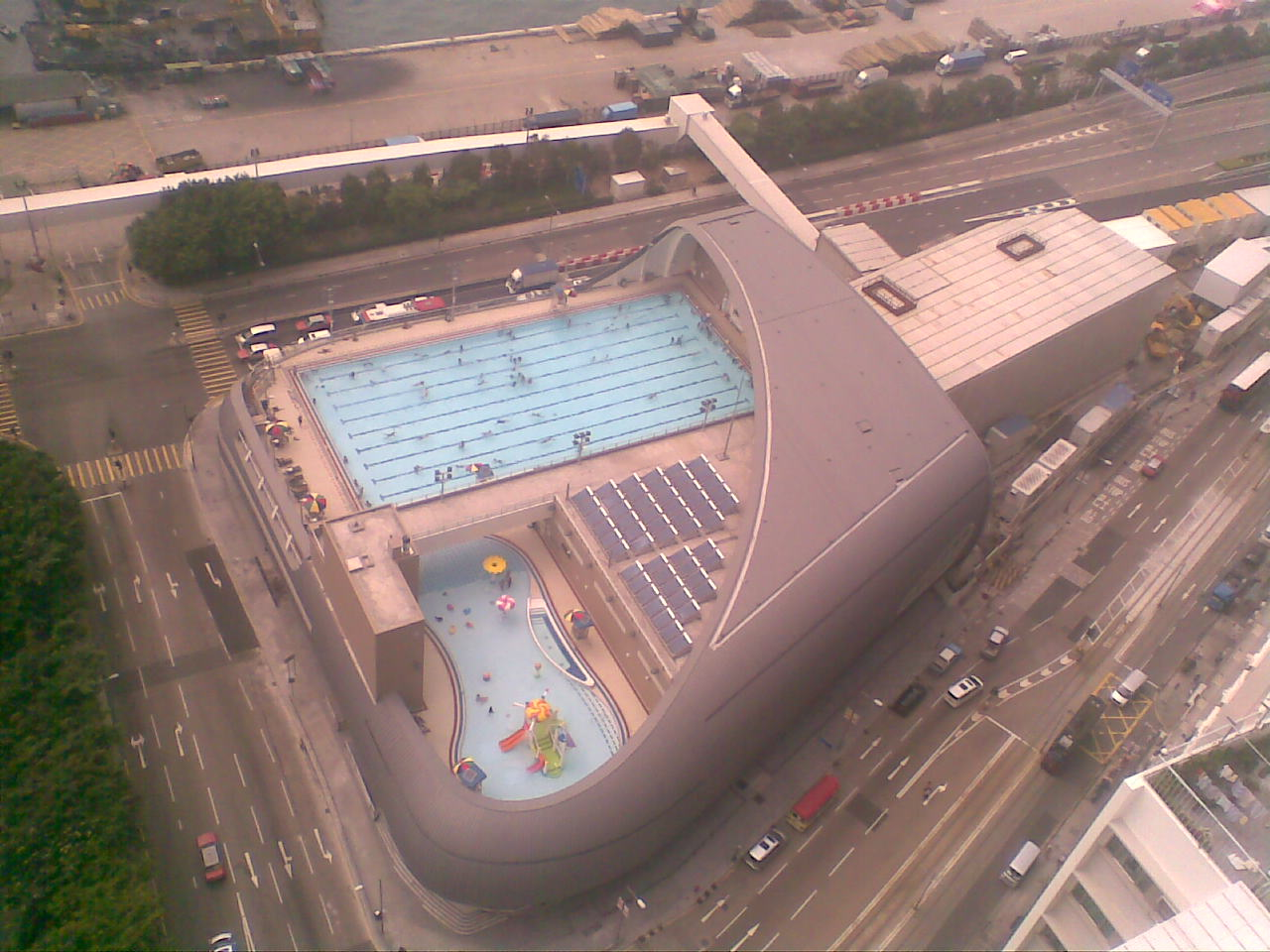
New Kennedy Town Swimming Pool opened in 2011

== Gallery ==
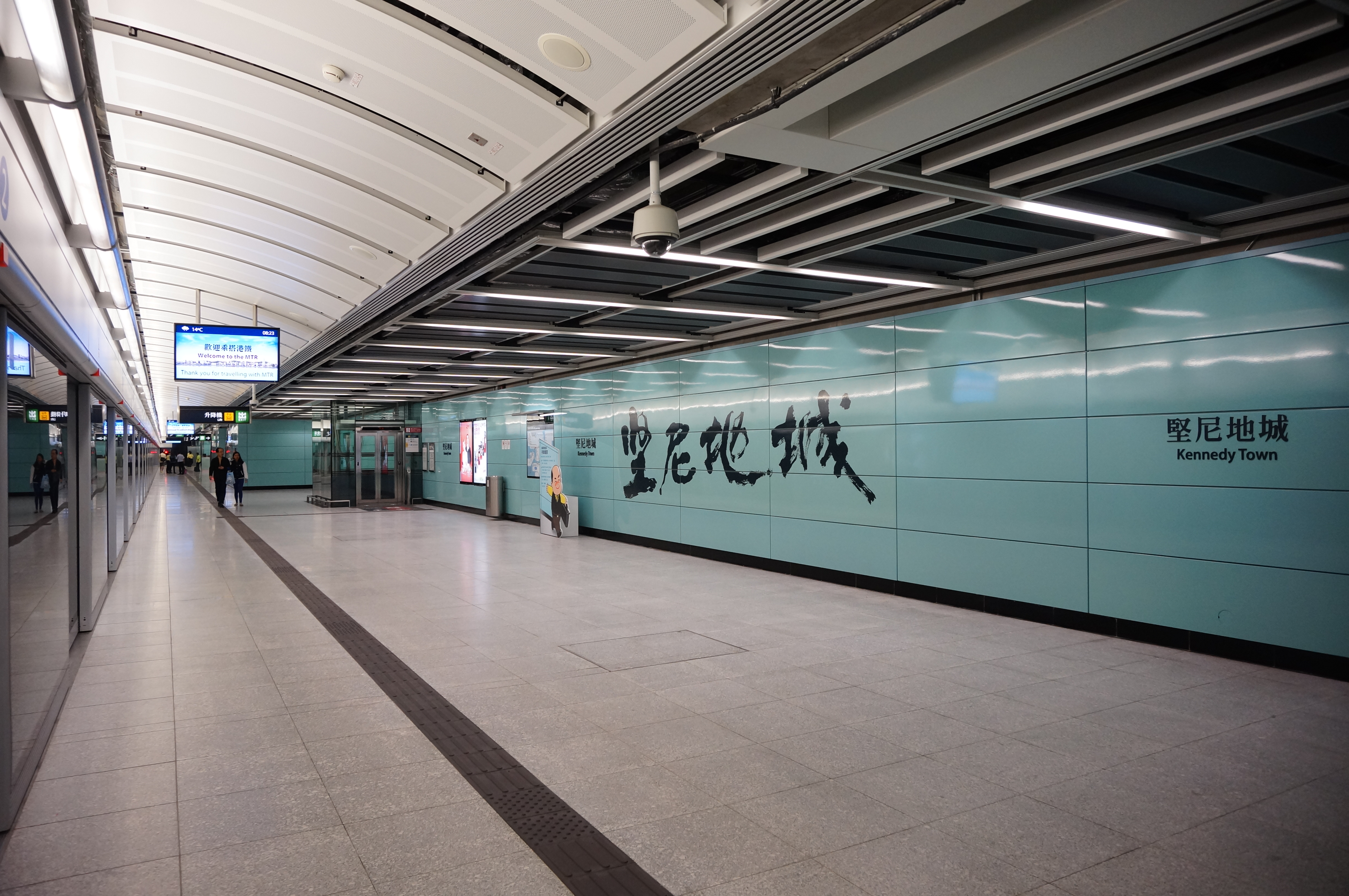
Platform 2 (termination platform)

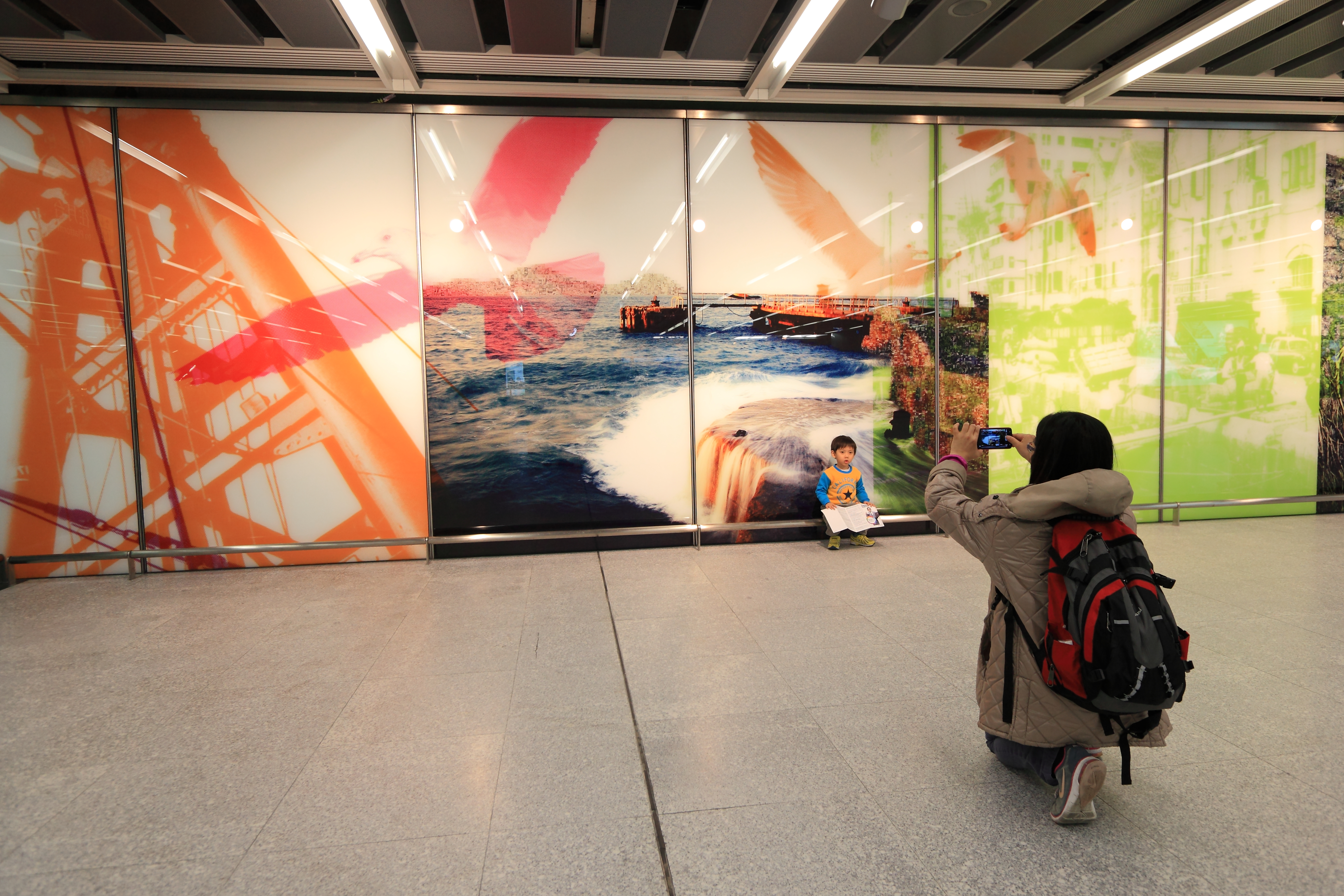
Tsui Piu - Displacing

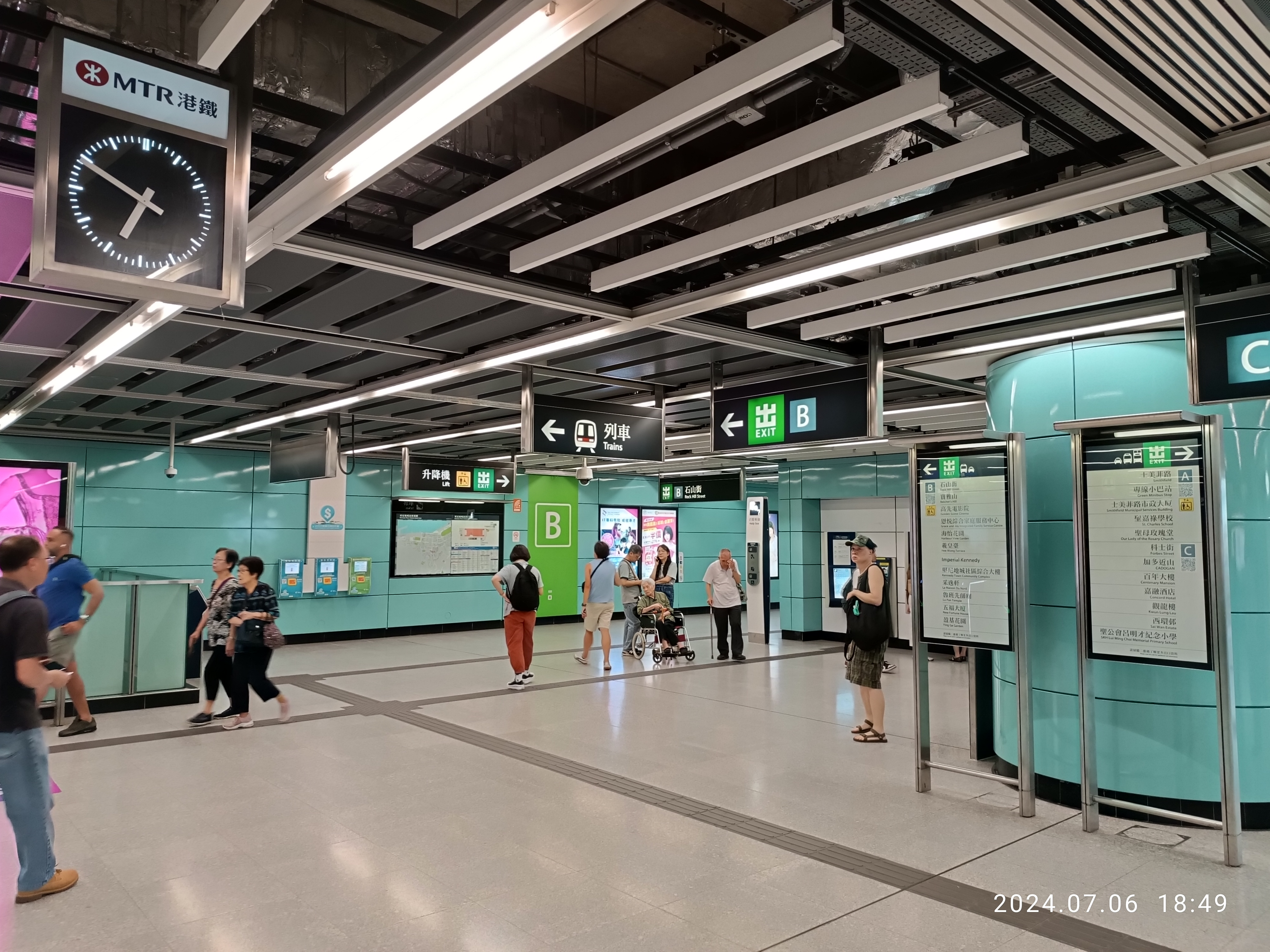
Concourse

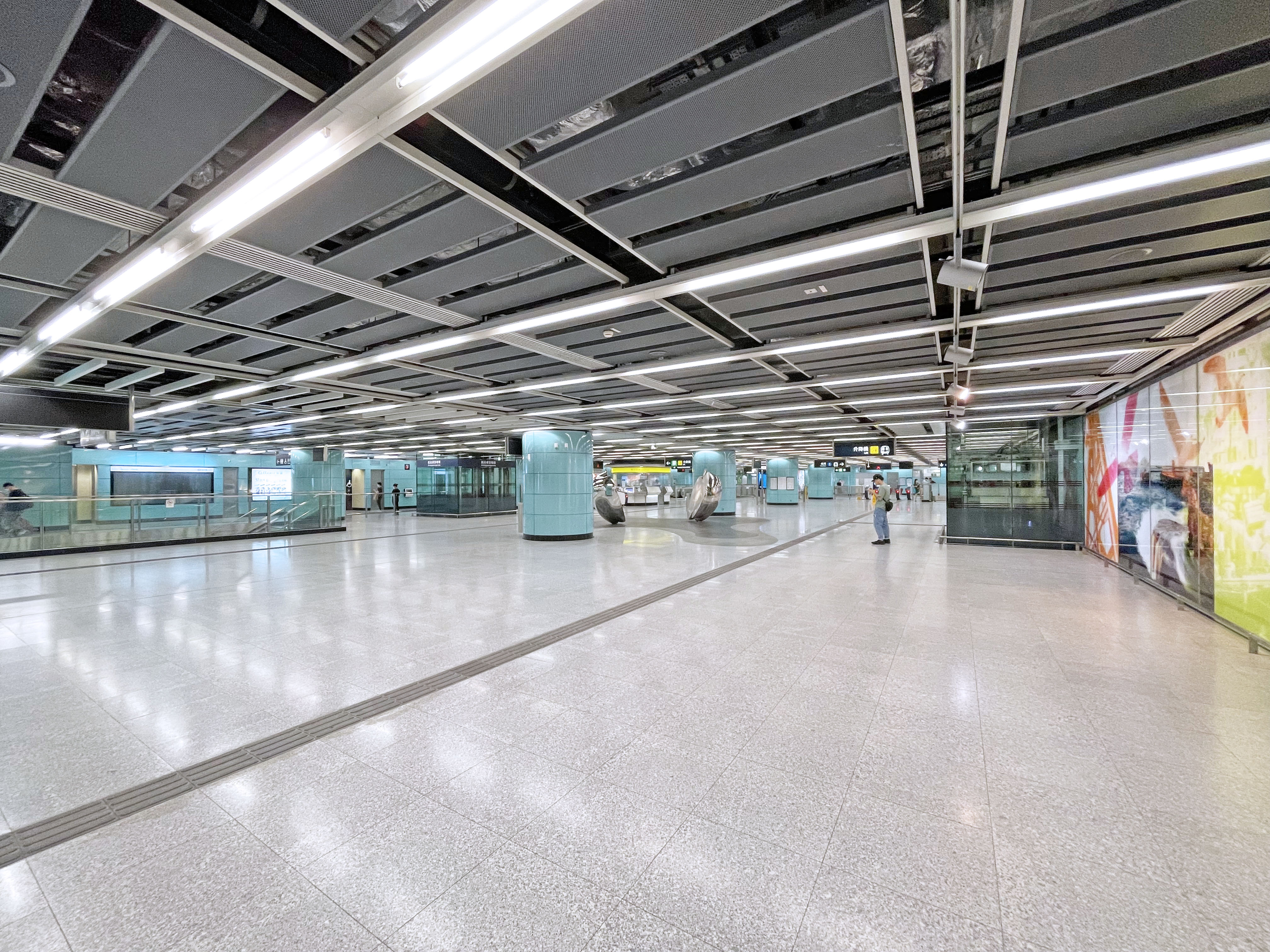

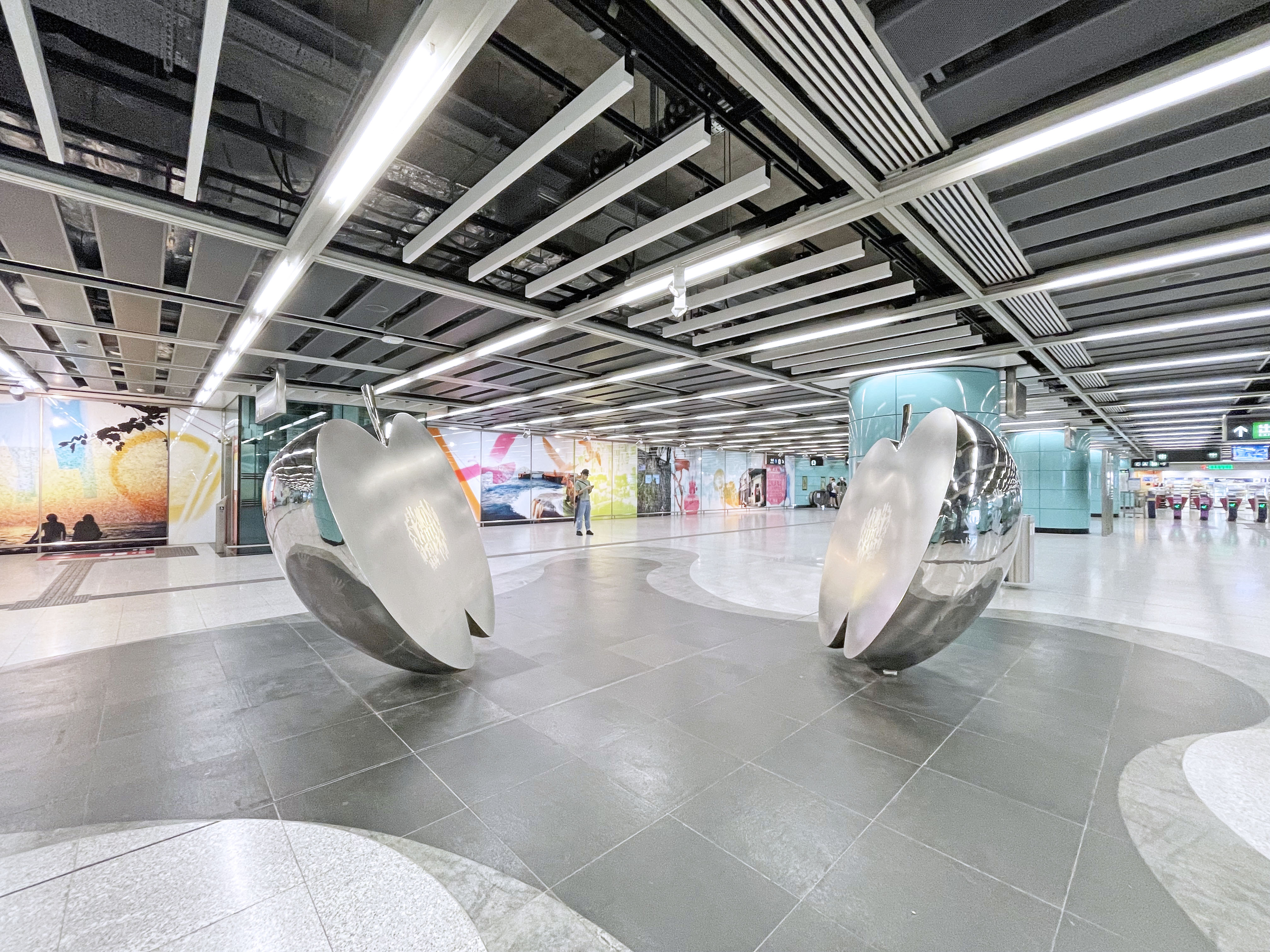
Concourse art
